= Holt Manufacturing Company =

Defunct American tractor company, predecessor to Caterpillar Tractor Company

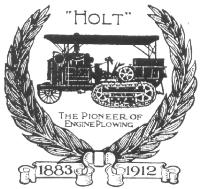
- The company's first logo as it appeared on a 25th anniversary sales brochure
- Type: Private company
- Industry: Agricultural machinery, construction
- Predecessor: Holt Bros. Manufacturing
- Founded: 1883; 143 years ago (Stockton Wheel Service); January 7, 1892; 134 years ago (Holt Manufacturing Company); Stockton, California, United States
- Founder: Ames Holt, Benjamin Holt Charles Holt, William Holt
- Defunct: April 15, 1925
- Fate: Merged with C. L. Best Tractor Company
- Successor: Caterpillar Tractor Company
- Headquarters: Stockton, California, United States
- Area served: United States, Canada, Europe
- Key people: Benjamin Holt, founder and President; Charles Holt, founder; Clarence Leo Best
- Number of employees: 2,100 (1918)
- Subsidiaries: Aurora Engine Company; Best Manufacturing Company; Canadian Holt Company, Limited; Holt Caterpillar Company; Holt Manufacturing Company; Houser and Haines Manufacturing Company; Stockton Wheel Co.

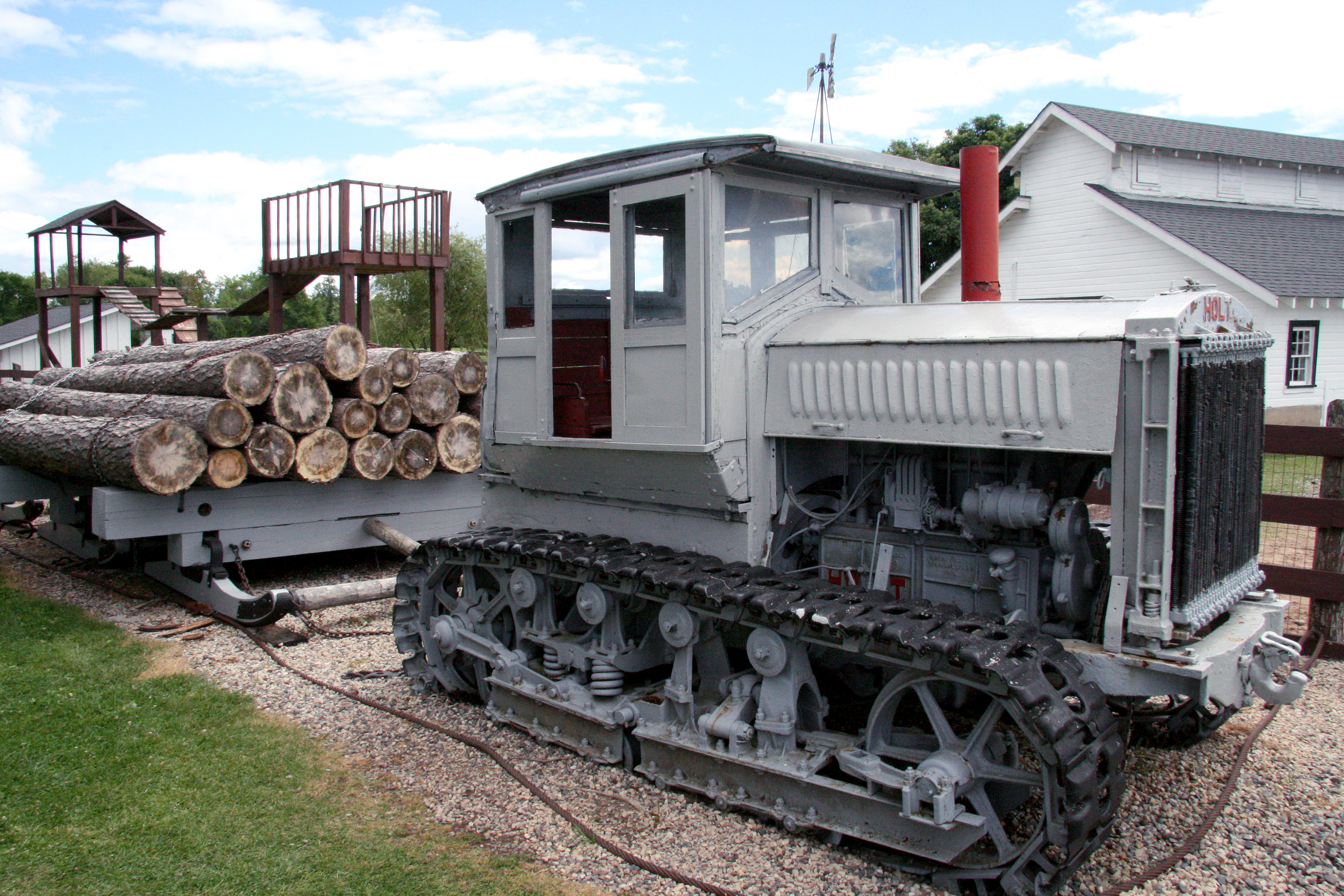
HOLT (before 1925)

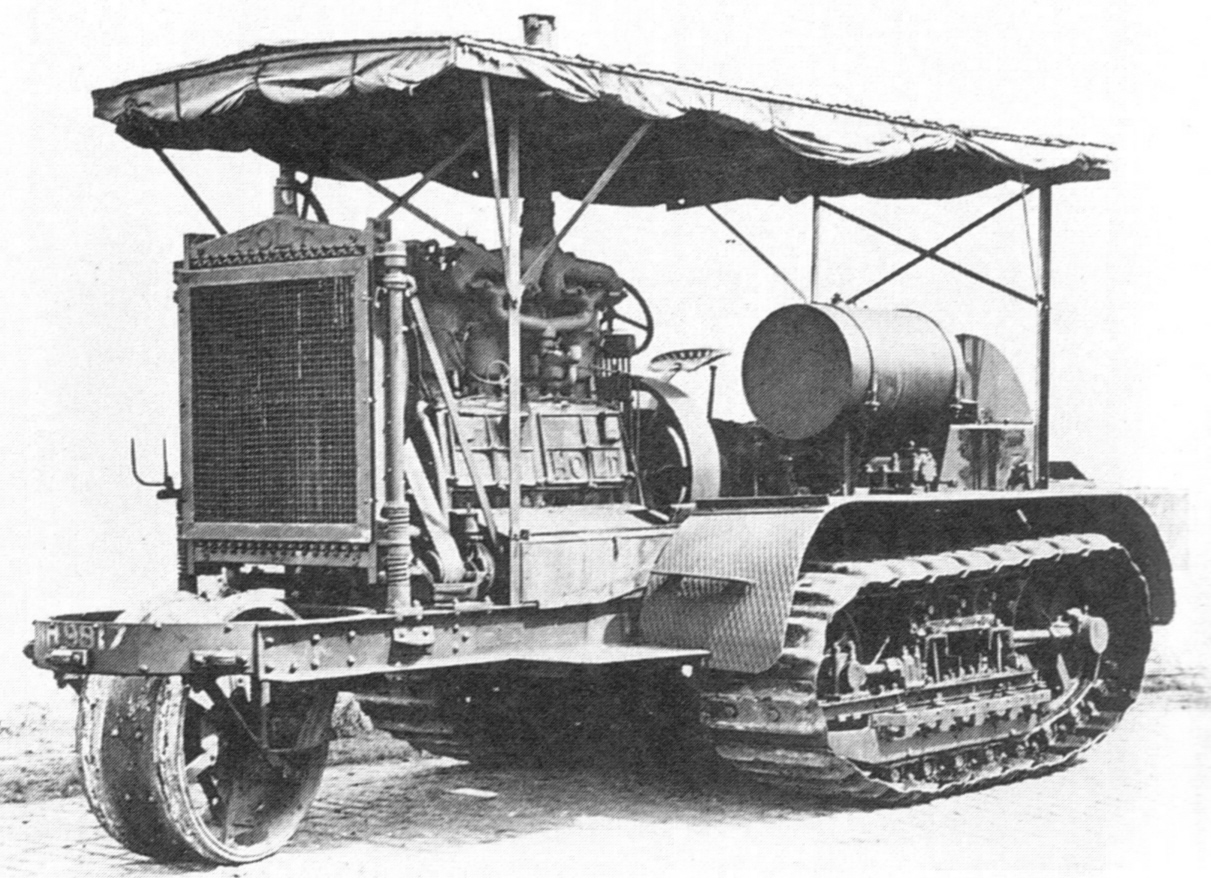
The Holt 75 model gasoline-powered Caterpillar tractor used early in World War I as an artillery tractor. Later models were produced without the front "tiller wheel".

The Holt Manufacturing Company was an agricultural implement and tractor maker, founded in Stockton, California, United States, and in operation between 1883 and 1925. It began with the 1883 establishment of Stockton Wheel Service. Benjamin Holt, later credited with patenting the first workable crawler ("caterpillar") tractor design, incorporated the Holt Manufacturing Company in 1892. Holt Manufacturing Company was the first company to successfully manufacture a continuous track tractor (Hornsby in England manufactured at least two full length "track steer" machines, and their patent was later purchased by Holt in 1913, allowing Holt to claim to be the "inventor" of the crawler tractor). By the early 20th century, Holt Manufacturing Company was the leading manufacturer of combine harvesters in the US, and the leading California-based manufacturer of steam traction engines.

Holt Manufacturing Company operated from Stockton, California, until opening a satellite facility in Walla Walla, Washington, to serve the Pacific Northwest. In 1909 Holt Manufacturing Company expanded by purchasing the facility of defunct farm implement maker Colean Manufacturing Company in East Peoria, Illinois. Holt changed the name of the company to Holt Caterpillar Company, although he did not trademark the name Caterpillar until 1910.

The company's initial products focused on agricultural machinery and were distributed internationally. During World War I, almost all of its production was military materiel. Its tractors were widely used by the Allies to supplant horses pulling haul heavy artillery and tow supply trains. Holt tractors also played a part, to varying degrees, in the development of military tanks in Great Britain, France, and Germany. Holt's equipment was credited with helping the Allies to win the war.

As the war ended, the Holt company was left with huge surplus inventories of heavy-duty tractors ill-suited for the agricultural market, which had been dominated during the war by the Holt Company's primary competitor, C. L. Best. The company decided to focus instead on heavy construction equipment and sought to capitalize on the passage of the Federal Aid Highway Act of 1921. Laden with debt and needing more capital to switch its product line, the company struggled to move forward.

Both the Holt Manufacturing Company and C. L. Best were hurt by the depression of 1920–21 which further inhibited sales. Both companies streamlined their over-lapping product lines. The two companies had spent about US$1.5 million (about $27,537,951 today) in legal fees fighting each other in various contractual, trademark, and patent infringement lawsuits since 1905. On the advice of investors, the two companies merged in 1925 to form the Caterpillar Tractor Co. As of 2010, Caterpillar Inc. was the 229th largest company in the world.

== Company origins ==
Charles H. Holt arrived in San Francisco from Concord, New Hampshire, in 1864 to form C. H. Holt and Co. Initially the company produced wooden wagon wheels and later, steel wheels for streetcars. In 1869, at age 20, his younger brother Benjamin went to work in their father's sawmill in New Hampshire along with William Harrison Holt and Ames Frank Holt, preparing hardwoods for shipping to Charles in San Francisco. William and Ames joined Charles in San Francisco in 1871.

In the same year, Charles and Ames established the Holt Brothers Company in San Francisco. The company sold hardwood, lumber, and wagon and carriage materials, primarily manufacturing wagon axles, wheels, and frames. W. Harrison Holt and Ames both temporarily returned around 1871 to New Hampshire – where both were married – to manage the eastern business. The brothers built a factory in Concord, New Hampshire, to manufacture wagon wheels, wheel components, bodies and running gear. In 1872, at age 23, Benjamin was given an interest in his father's business, and he assumed more responsibility for the company's operations. W. Harrison Holt moved to Tiffin, Ohio, to manage the company's lumber business there, where he remained until the early 1880s. Their mother died in 1875, and their father died eight years later in 1883. After his father's death, Benjamin Holt left New Hampshire in 1883 to help Charles build the business in California.

Charles, Benjamin, and Frank incorporated the Holt Bros. Company on January 7, 1892, to deal in lumber and iron. Four days later, they also filed incorporation papers for "Holt Manufacturing Company" with Charles H. Holt, Benjamin Holt, Frank A. Holt, G. H. Cowie, and G. L. Dickenson as directors.

The Holt Bros. Company formed a subsidiary, "The Stockton Wheel Company", to build the wheels. They based their company in the Central Valley town of Stockton, California. Stockton was an ideal location, as it could be reached by ocean-going ship via the San Joaquin River, 72 miles (116 km) east of San Francisco, and was hot enough to season woods to prepare them for use in the arid valleys of California and the deserts of the West. The factory cost US$65,000 (or about $2,515,500 ) to build and used a 40 horsepower Corliss steam engine manufactured in Providence, Rhode Island, and shipped around Cape Horn. All of the plant's machines were driven by belts connected to the Corliss engine.

Brothers Charles and Benjamin eventually bought out the other brothers, with Charles running the business side and Benjamin running manufacturing operations.

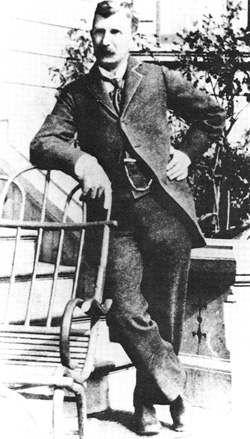
Benjamin Holt, first to patent a workable crawling-type tread design, at age 45 in 1894

During the first year, the Holt subsidiary Stockton Wheel Company produced 6,000 wagon wheels and 5,000 carriage bodies. One of their most popular wheel types was 10 feet (3.0 m) in diameter used by redwood loggers, who connected two of these wheels with a strong 10 ft (3.0 m) axle, and then attached a team of horses to pull logs from the forest.

=== Farm equipment and tractors ===
In the late 19th century, there were companies globally striving to build a practical horse-drawn combine harvester and other farm equipment. They soon progressed to steam-powered farm machinery and, later, designs for crawler-type tractors. More than 100 patents were issued for various crawler designs. Holt began manufacturing horse-drawn combine harvesters in the 1890s and converted to steam-power types around the early 20th century. Over the next few years, Benjamin Holt designed and manufactured the first successful crawler-type tractor and designed a gasoline engine (see Tractor design, below.)

In California, the Best Manufacturing Company of San Leandro and the Holt Manufacturing Company were competitors. In 1905, they resolved a patent infringement lawsuit when Daniel Best retired and gave one-third of Best Manufacturing Company to his son, Clarence Leo ("C. L.") Best. He sold the remaining two-thirds to Benjamin Holt for US$325,000 (roughly equivalent to $11,645,833 today). C. L. Best was made plant manager of the new concern, but Holt retained effective control. C. L. did not stay long, and left in 1910 to form the C. L. Best Gas Traction Company to replace his father's firm, resulting in further difficulties between the two men. Holt registered "Caterpillar" as a trademark in 1911.

=== Plant in Illinois ===
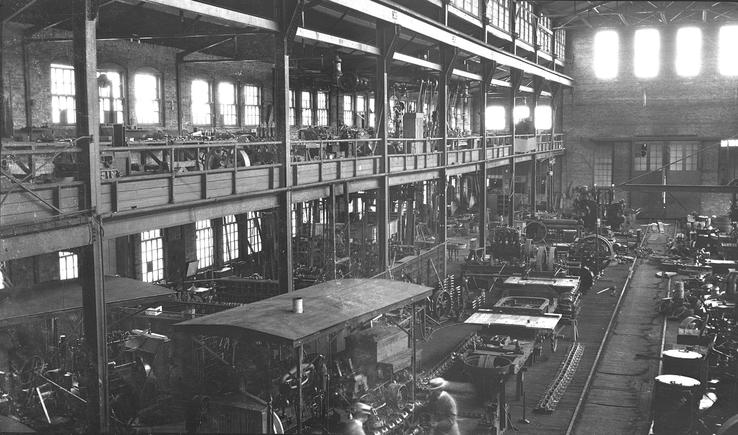
The Holt Caterpillar Co. factory in East Peoria, Illinois, in 1910. Tractors were assembled in place before assembly lines were introduced. Holt bought the plant from the bankrupt Colean Manufacturing Co. in 1910.

Holt wanted to find manufacturing facilities closer to the vast agricultural markets of the midwest. Benjamin Holt's nephew, Pliny E. Holt, had been dispatched in March 1909 to Minneapolis, Minnesota, where he began manufacturing operations. They shipped parts for ten Model 45 tractors, but only two were produced. Pliny met Murray Baker, an implement dealer, who knew of an available factory that had been used to manufacture farm implements and steam traction engines. Baker, who later became the first executive vice president of what became Caterpillar Tractor Company, wrote to Holt headquarters in Stockton and described the plant of the bankrupt Colean Manufacturing Co. of East Peoria, Illinois. Pliny inspected the Colean factory in late June 1909 and learned they had spent at least $450,000 on the relatively new building and machinery. Holt could acquire the assets for the $50,000 note held by a trust company. Pliny Holt wrote a letter to the Stockton management team on July 1, 1909, reporting, "The plant is as complete and perfect in every detail as I have ever seen ... and one of the best arranged plants that I ever saw."

On October 25, 1909, Pliny Holt purchased the factory, and immediately began preparing the plant for operations with 12 employees. The "Holt Caterpillar Company" was incorporated in both Illinois and California on January 12, 1910, and Pliny accepted the deed to the plant on Feb 16, 1910. East Peoria became Holt Manufacturing Company's eastern manufacturing plant, competing with the nearby Avery Tractor Company.

The Peoria facility proved so profitable that only two years later the Peoria facility employed 625 people and was exporting tractors to Argentina, Canada, and Mexico. Tractors were built in both Stockton and East Peoria.

=== Los Angeles Aqueduct ===
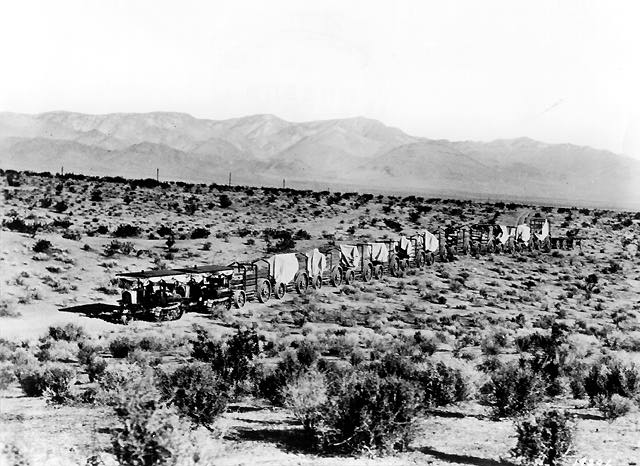
Two Holt 45 gas crawling-type tractors team up to pull a long wagon train in the Mojave Desert during construction of the Los Angeles Aqueduct in 1909.

In 1909, the engineers building the 233-mile-long (375 km) Los Angeles Aqueduct bought one of Holt's Model 70-120 tractors to haul supplies across the Mojave Desert. It effortlessly hauled 30 short tons (27 t) up a 14% grade. They were so impressed that they ordered 26 more, giving the Holt tractor and the company considerable credibility and substantially boosting sales.

=== Subsidiaries merged ===
In 1913, Holt merged its various companies into the Holt Manufacturing Company, with a combined capital of US$3 million. The merged subsidiaries were: the Stockton Wheel Co.; the Houser and Haines Manufacturing Company of Stockton; the Aurora Engine Company of Stockton; the Best Manufacturing Company of San Leandro; the Canadian Holt Company, Limited of Calgary; the Holt Manufacturing Company of Stockton; and the Holt Caterpillar Company of Peoria, Illinois.

=== Post-war challenges ===
Holt tractors were widely used as artillery tractors during WWI, and their capabilities and reliability had become well known. Benjamin Holt gained experience securing government contracts. These capabilities separated him from his competition. Holt had obtained significant loans, and begun expansion to meet the war planners' need for his tractors. Holt also made a steam powered tank for evaluation using Doble steam engines.

C. L. Best Gas Tractor Company had meanwhile concentrated on supplying the market for smaller agricultural tractors. Although Best did not make tractors for the war effort, they had secured promises from the federal government that they would be able to obtain all the steel required to continue building tractors for farmers during the war. As a result, Best had gained a considerable market advantage over Holt by war's end. Best also assumed considerable debt to allow it to continue expansion, especially production of its new Model 60 "Tracklayer".

When the war ended, Holt's planned expansion to meet the military's needs was no longer needed. The company was left in a difficult situation. The types of tractors needed by the military were very different from what farmers needed. Their situation was worsened as artillery tractors were brought back from Europe, depressing prices for new equipment and Holt's unsold inventory of military tractors. The company moved to focus less on agricultural machinery and more on producing road-building equipment. To keep the company afloat, they borrowed heavily.

Both companies were affected by the transition from a wartime to a peacetime economy, which contributed to a nationwide depression, further inhibiting sales.

On December 5, 1920, 71-year-old Benjamin Holt died after a month-long illness. Holt had been considered a "quiet and unassuming man who loved his work". He was well liked by his workers and dedicated a trust fund for employees who suffered financial difficulties.

=== Caterpillar company formed ===
The banks who held the company's large debt forced the Holt board of directors to accept their candidate, Thomas F. Baxter, to succeed Benjamin Holt. Baxter was a former Boston banker who had joined the Holt company in 1913 as a business manager. The company struggled with the transition from wartime boom to peacetime bust. Baxter initially cut the large tractors from the company's product line and introduced smaller models focused on the agricultural market. When the Federal Aid Highway Act of 1921 funded a US$1 billion federal highway building program, Baxter began focusing company assets towards road construction. Along with the C. L. Best Gas Traction Company, formed by Clarence Leo Best in 1910, Holt faced fierce competition with the Fordson company.

Between 1907 and 1918, Best and Holt had spent about US$1.5 million in legal fees fighting each other. The two companies competed economically and intellectually: Benjamin Holt had 47 patents in his name, while his nephew Pliny Holt had 38 patents; Best founder Daniel Best received 42 patents and his son C. L. Best had 27 patents.

Harry H. Fair of the bond brokerage house of Pierce, Fair & Company of San Francisco was involved in funding C. L. Best's debt, when Holt shareholders approached him about their company's financial plight. He concluded that both companies might not survive and recommended that the Holt and Best companies should consolidate operations. In April and May 1925, the financially stronger C. L. Best merged with the market leader Holt Caterpillar to form the Caterpillar Tractor Co. Baxter had been removed as CEO earlier in 1925, and Clarence Leo Best assumed the title of CEO, and remained in that role until October 1951. The new company was headquartered in San Leandro until 1930, when under the terms of the merger it was moved to Peoria.

The Caterpillar company consolidated its product lines, offering only five track-type tractors: the 2 Ton, 5 Ton, and 10 Ton from the Holt Manufacturing Company's old product line and the Caterpillar 30 and Caterpillar 60 from the C. L. Best Tractor Co.'s former product line. The 10 Ton and 5 Ton models were discontinued in 1926. In 1928, the 2 Ton was discontinued. The first completely new tractor produced after the union of the two companies was the 1929 Caterpillar L20.

After Benjamin Holt's death in 1920, William K. "Bill" Holt formed the first Caterpillar dealership in Mexico. In 1933, he was authorized to operate the dealership for the 60 southern counties of Texas. The company merged with another Holt business and was renamed HOLT CAT. It continues as the largest Caterpillar dealership in the US, under the ownership and management of Benjamin's great-grandson, Peter Holt (who is better known as the owner of the NBA's San Antonio Spurs, the five-time world champions).

As of 2010, Caterpillar Inc. was the 229nd largest company in the world. In 2011, Caterpillar was the best-performing stock last year among the 30 companies in the Dow Jones industrial average with a market value of US$45.13 billion. Caterpillar is one of the 30 companies whose publicly listed shares are tracked in the Dow Jones Industrial Average. It is a Fortune 500 company, ranked number 229 in 2010, and first in its industry, with more than $67 billion in assets.

== Tractor design ==
=== Horse-drawn combine harvester ===
Among his brothers, Benjamin was the most technically adept. He saw the need for farm machinery, and expanded the company's line to include farm equipment, including combine harvesters and steam-powered traction engines required to pull them through the fields. In 1883, Benjamin Holt produced his first horse-drawn "Link-Belt Combined Harvester". It allowed a farmer to combine cutting and threshing grain into a single mechanical operation, enabling farmers to cut more wheat in one pass, increasing productivity and cutting labor hours nearly in half. One key innovation Holt implemented was using flexible chain belts rather than gears to transmit power from the ground wheels to the working parts of the machine.

In 1886, the company sold its first combine harvester. It had a 14-foot (4.3 m) cutting bar and was pulled by an 18-horse team. The largest combine Stockton Wheel Co. manufactured had a 50-foot-long (15 m) cutting bar. In comparison, large modern combines have a 20-foot (6.1 m) cutting bar. Some of the Holt combines needed as many as 40 horses to operate.

Holt adapted the combine to work on slopes. He added two separate wooden frames which enabled the drive wheels to be raised or lowered independently. This allowed the combine to operate on slopes as steep as 30 degrees while the threshing machine remained level. In 1890, Holt built his first experimental steam traction engine, nicknamed "Old Betsy". Built on a 24-foot-long (7.3 m) frame, it developed 60 horsepower (45 kW) from a single cylinder (11-inch diameter (280 mm), 12-inch stroke (300 mm)). The firebox could burn wood, coal, or oil as fuel. Carrying 675 US gallons (2,560 L; 562 imp gal) of water, the traction engine weighed 48,000 pounds (22,000 kg) and rode on huge metal wheels. Holt's tractors were popular despite their weight and awkward size because they could harvest large fields for one-sixth the cost of a horse-drawn combine. Foresters soon adapted them to haul redwood logs out of road-less forests. By 1897, the company had about 200 employees and had sold over 800 of their combined harvesters in California. Holt Manufacturing made about 130 steam-powered tractors between 1890 and 1904.

The steam tractors were extremely heavy, sometimes weighing 1,000 pounds (450 kg) per horsepower, and often sank into the rich, soft earth of the San Joaquin Valley Delta farmland surrounding Stockton, California. Holt tried to solve the problem by increasing the size and width of the wheels, but this also made the tractors increasingly complex, expensive, and difficult to maintain. One tractor had wheels 7.5 feet (2.3 m) tall and 6 feet (1.8 m) wide, producing a tractor 46 feet (14 m) wide. Holt could spend hours in his private workshop, and experimented by adding multiple wheels and ultimately with a track-laying technique.

=== First workable crawling tread ===
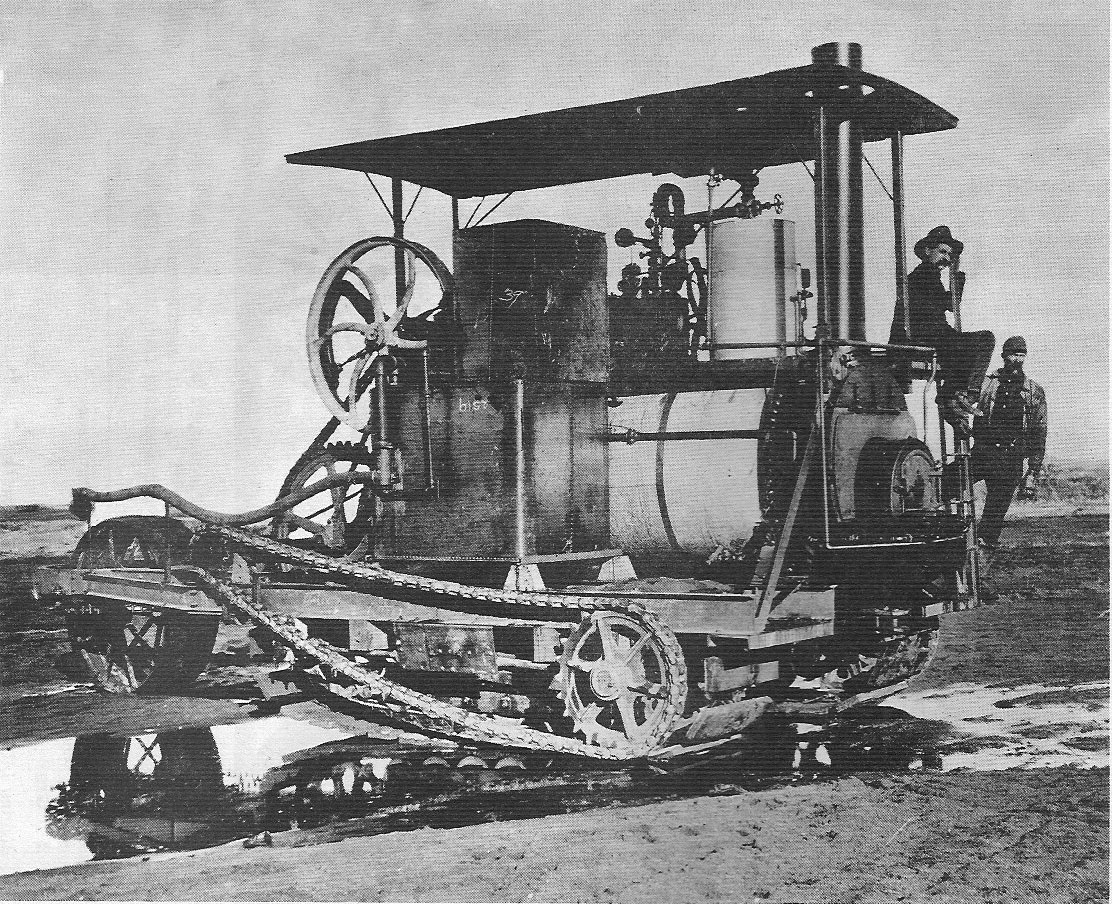
Holt Steamer No. 77, the second prototype of a crawler-track-type tractor, on a trial run demonstrating its ability to travel across the marshy peat soil of Roberts Island

Many people had attempted to add tracks to moving machines. Over 100 patents had already been issued worldwide, but all failed to work in practical situations. In 1903 Benjamin Holt paid Alvin Orlando Lombard US$60,000 for the right to produce vehicles under Lombard's patent for the Lombard Steam Log Hauler. The center of innovation was in England, and in the same year Holt traveled to England to learn more about ongoing development. During that period, the chief engineer (and managing director) of Richard Hornsby & Sons in Grantham, England, David Roberts, was experimenting with a chain-track. Hornsby's design incorporated a steering clutch that varied the speed of each set of wheels, allowing the operator to turn the tractor by retarding one tread or the other. Roberts of Hornsby & Sons obtained a patent for their design in July 1904.

By December 1903, Holt wielded considerable influence over former competitors, including Houser-Haines Manufacturing and Mattison-Williamson Works.

Holt returned to Stockton and applied his skills and his company's expertise in metallurgy, design, and testing to develop a workable track-laying system. He replaced the wheels on a 40 horsepower (30 kW) Holt steamer, No. 77, with a set of wooden tracks bolted to chains. On Thanksgiving Day, November 24, 1904, he successfully tested the updated machine plowing the soggy delta land of Roberts Island. Company photographer Charles Clements, looking at the machine's upside-down image through his camera lens, commented that the track rising and falling over the carrier rollers looked like a caterpillar and Holt seized on the metaphor. "Caterpillar it is. That's the name for it!" Others reported that Holt got the name from British troops who witnessed a working prototype of Hornsby's track-type vehicle in July 1907. Continuous tracks allowed practical cultivation of the rich farmland on an industrial scale. The invention also allowed planters to reclaim thousands of acres of delta land previously unusable for farming.

Holt began producing models under the Caterpillar brand. His first production model had a dual-track frame 30 inches (760 mm) high by 42 inches (1,100 mm) wide by 9 feet (2.7 m) long. Its tracks used 3 by 4 inches (76 mm × 102 mm) slats made of the same redwood used previously to produce wagon wheels. Holt sold the first model of steam-powered tractor crawlers for US$5,500. By 1915, the Holt company employed 1,000 workers in its Stockton plant. Nearly 2,000 Caterpillar crawlers had been sold in more than 20 countries.

=== Gasoline engines ===
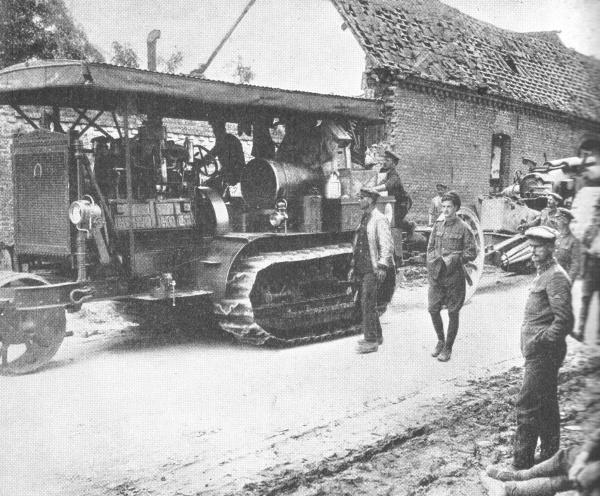
A Holt 75 tractor towing a field gun through a war-damaged village in Europe. The tractor is stacked high with supplies, and a number of uniformed soldiers are walking alongside.

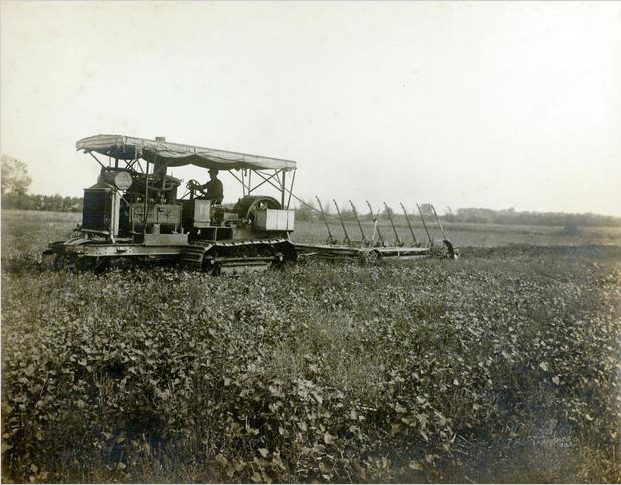
A Holt 60-horsepower, four-cylinder valve-in-head gasoline Caterpillar (s/n 524) in 1912. The tractor was restored in the late 1960s and is the oldest surviving East Peoria-built tractor known to exist.

Pliny E. Holt, the son of Benjamin's half-brother, William Harrison Holt, had been working with Stockton Wheel Company for the past nine years. In 1906, he was named president of the newly formed Aurora Engine Company, named after Aurora Street in Stockton where it was located. The new company manufactured gasoline engines to replace the large, heavy steam boilers used to power the earlier Holt tractors. A gasoline engine considerably reduced the overall size and weight of a tractor, produced more power per pound of weight, and reduced the tractor's cost, making it more cost-effective and affordable. Holt's most popular gasoline engine tractor was a Model 75, weighing 24,000 pounds (11,000 kg) with a 75 horsepower (56 kW) engine. Pliny was also treasurer of another subsidiary, the Houser and Haines Manufacturing Company of Stockton, from 1905 to 1909.

As well as having a better power-to-weight ratio, a gasoline-engined tractor required fewer men to operate it.

=== Tiller wheel ===
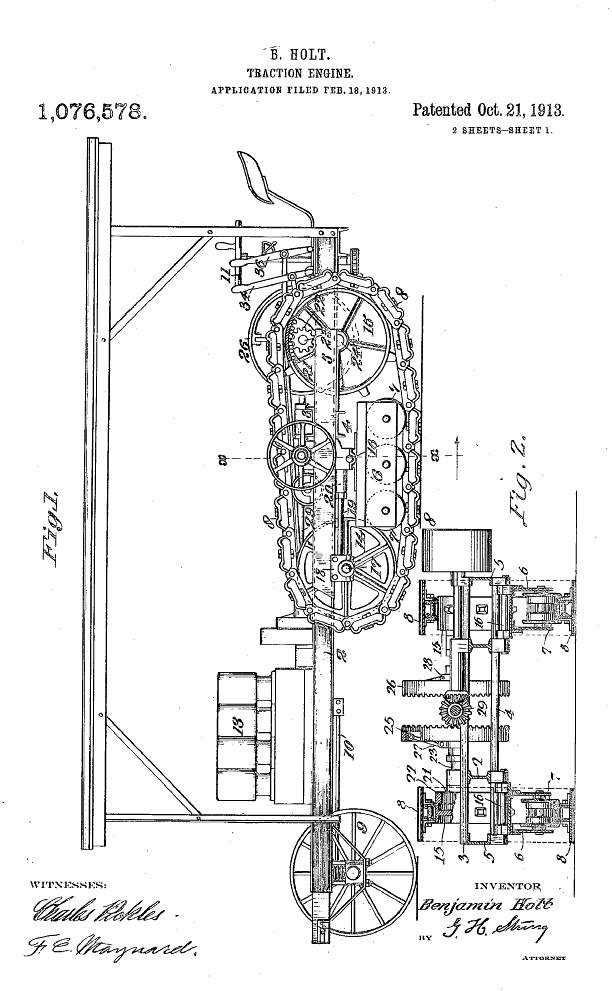
Holt Machinery Company patent for a track-type tractor, number #1076578. Filing date: Feb 18, 1913; issue date: Oct 21, 1913.

C. L. Best introduced a crawler tractor in 1913 that was virtually a carbon copy of Holt's design. Holt's tractors had a conventional wheel on the front, which was used to steer, and crawling-type wheels on the back, but otherwise looked very similar to a traction engine. During 1914, both Best and Holt introduced models without the front "tiller" or steering wheel. Holt offered the Caterpillar 45 and Best introduced his C. L. Best Model 40 "Tracklayer".

== Patents and trademark disputes ==
Benjamin Holt aggressively defended his patents and was quick to sue anyone he felt might be infringing his rights. In June 1899, he claimed that the Haines-Houser's tractors used certain devices for which Holt held the trademark. Holt sent all farmers who owned Haines-Houser tractors in Yolo County, California, a letter containing a demand that they stop using the competitor's harvesters or face a lawsuit. In the same month he sued William W. Nelson, George W. Bailey, Henry K. Heiken, Hugh A. Logan, William Sullivan, and three other Sullivans for infringement of his patents for "traveling threshers and combined harvesters." The defendants successfully filed a demurrer, getting the suit dismissed 16 months later. Competitors latched onto Holt's litigious nature and warned farmers considering buying his equipment that they might be prosecuted for patent infringement.

=== Holt payment to Best ===
In 1905, a patent infringement lawsuit ensued between Best and Holt. After three years of legal battles, the two companies decided to settle out of court. The parties resolved two suits when Holt made a cash payment to C. L. Best and provided C. L. Best a license giving them access to all Holt patents applying to manufacturing the C. L. Best's "Tracklayers". In 1916, C. L. Best bought his father's old factory in San Leandro, which Holt had closed after acquiring the company. C. L. Best built a new factory on the same location. His company gained attention for its continued improvements to its products.

=== Holt buys Lombard patent ===
Holt received a patent on December 7, 1907, for his improved "Traction Engine" ("improvement in vehicles, and especially of the traction engine class; and included endless traveling platform supports upon which the engine is carried"). In 1908, he designed a gasoline engine to power the tractor.

Although Holt had paid Alvin Orlando Lombard US$20,000 in 1903 (about $716,667 today) for rights to use his patents, Lombard visited Holt in 1910 complaining of patent infringement. In the opinion of Holt's "very expensive lawyers", they concluded that Lombard's patents had little value due to prior art. So when Lombard visited, Holt calmly took him on a leisurely country drive in his Oldsmobile roadster, and when Lombard raised the issue of money, Holt merely suggested that they divide the country. Lombard should take up the Northern woods and Holt would take the remainder of the nation. Holt promised to write a letter to that effect, although he never did.

=== Best invalidates Lombard patent ===
In 1915, the C. L. Best Gas Traction Co. exhibited its new "Tracklayer" at the California state fair. Holt once again sued, this time for patent infringement. C. L. Best thought that his best defense was to prove that Holt's patents violated Lombard's patents. One of Best's lawyers, Henry Montgomery, visited Lombard and sought his assistance as a friendly witness. Lombard was more than friendly. He allegedly responded, "By God, young man, I'm glad to see you. If God Almighty could charter me to kill a man, I'd get on the train and go to California and kill old Ben Holt."

=== Caterpillar trademark ===
Holt was credited with producing the first practical continuous tracks for use with tractors and he registered "Caterpillar" as a trademark in 1910. Since Holt had trademarked Caterpillar, Best named his tractors Tracklayers. In 1911, Holt began building the "Holt Model 60 Caterpillar" in its Stockton plant and a "Holt Model 40-60 Caterpillar" at its East Peoria factory.

=== New Best competitor re-emerges ===
In 1910, Daniel Best's son C. L. Best left the Holt Manufacturing Company where he had been general manager and re-established his father's company under the name C. L. Best Gas Traction Co. in Elmhurst, near San Leandro, California. Holt immediately sued, claiming breach of contract and infringement because as owner of the Best Manufacturing Company, he believed he also owned the "Best" name. Holt did not prevail and Best continued to produce tractors that directly competed with Holt's models.

Holt continued to innovate and worked to build a tractor that could perform rugged tasks yet was not itself heavy. He fitted adjustable blades onto his tractors and hired them out to grade roads and move soil and rock for construction purposes. By 1916, Holt had sold over 2,000 tractors worldwide.

== Early military uses ==
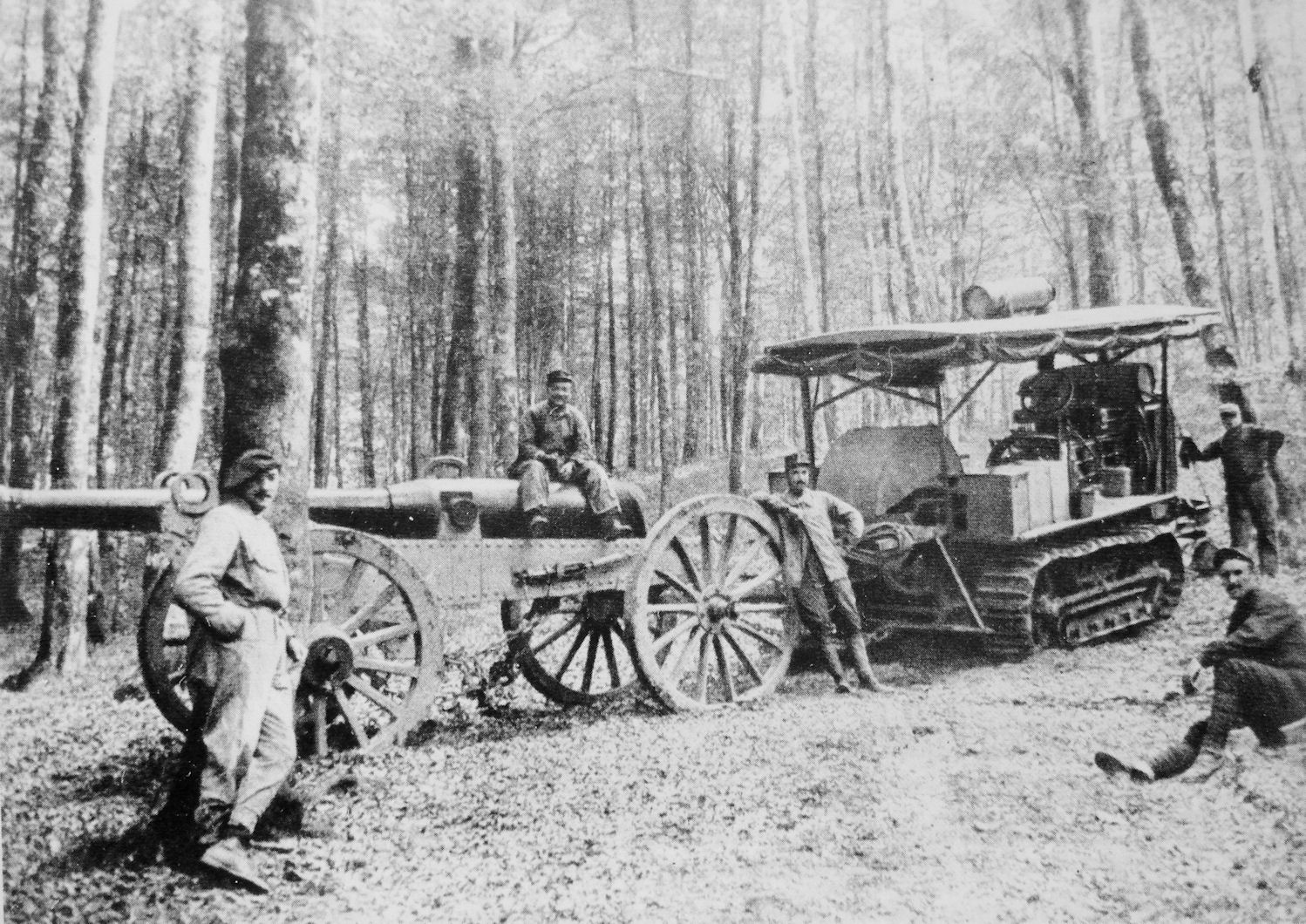
A Holt artillery tractor in use by the French Army in the Vosges during the spring of 1915

In England, starting in 1905, David Roberts of Richard Hornsby & Sons had attempted to interest British military officials in a tracked vehicle, but failed. Holt bought the patents related to the "chain track" track-type tractor from Richard Hornsby & Sons in 1912 for £4,000 (almost £400,000 at 2012 value). Unlike the Holt tractor, which had a steerable tiller wheel in front of the tracks, the Hornsby crawler was steered by controlling power to each track. Holt was more interested in the Hornsby's differential than in its complex track system.

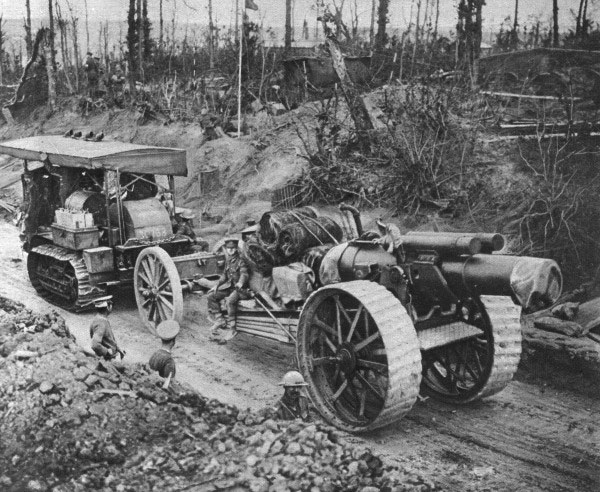
8-inch Howitzer Mk 1 being towed by a Holt tractor at the Battle of the Somme, 1916

When World War I broke out, with the problem of trench warfare and the difficulty of transporting supplies to the front, the pulling power of crawling-type tractors drew the attention of the military. Company Vice-President and general manager Pliny Holt had retired and traveled to Washington D.C. to offer his services, and was appointed by Gen. C. C. Williams, Chief of Ordnance, to serve as chairman of the board organized to handle the production of the "Caterpillar" Artillery program.

The British War Office ordered a Holt tractor and put it through trials at Aldershot. Although it was not as powerful as the 105 horsepower (78 kW) Foster-Daimler tractor, the 75 horsepower (56 kW) Holt was better suited to haul heavy loads over uneven ground. Without a load, the Holt tractor managed a walking pace of 4 miles per hour (6.4 km/h). Towing a load, it could manage 2 miles per hour (3.2 km/h). Most importantly, Holt tractors were readily available in quantity. The War Office was suitably impressed and chose it as a gun-tractor. Representatives of the French company Schneider were also present at the trial, and they ordered a number of Holt's 45 hp model, known as the "Baby", which unlike the 75 and 110 hp models, was fully tracked, with no forward tiller wheel.

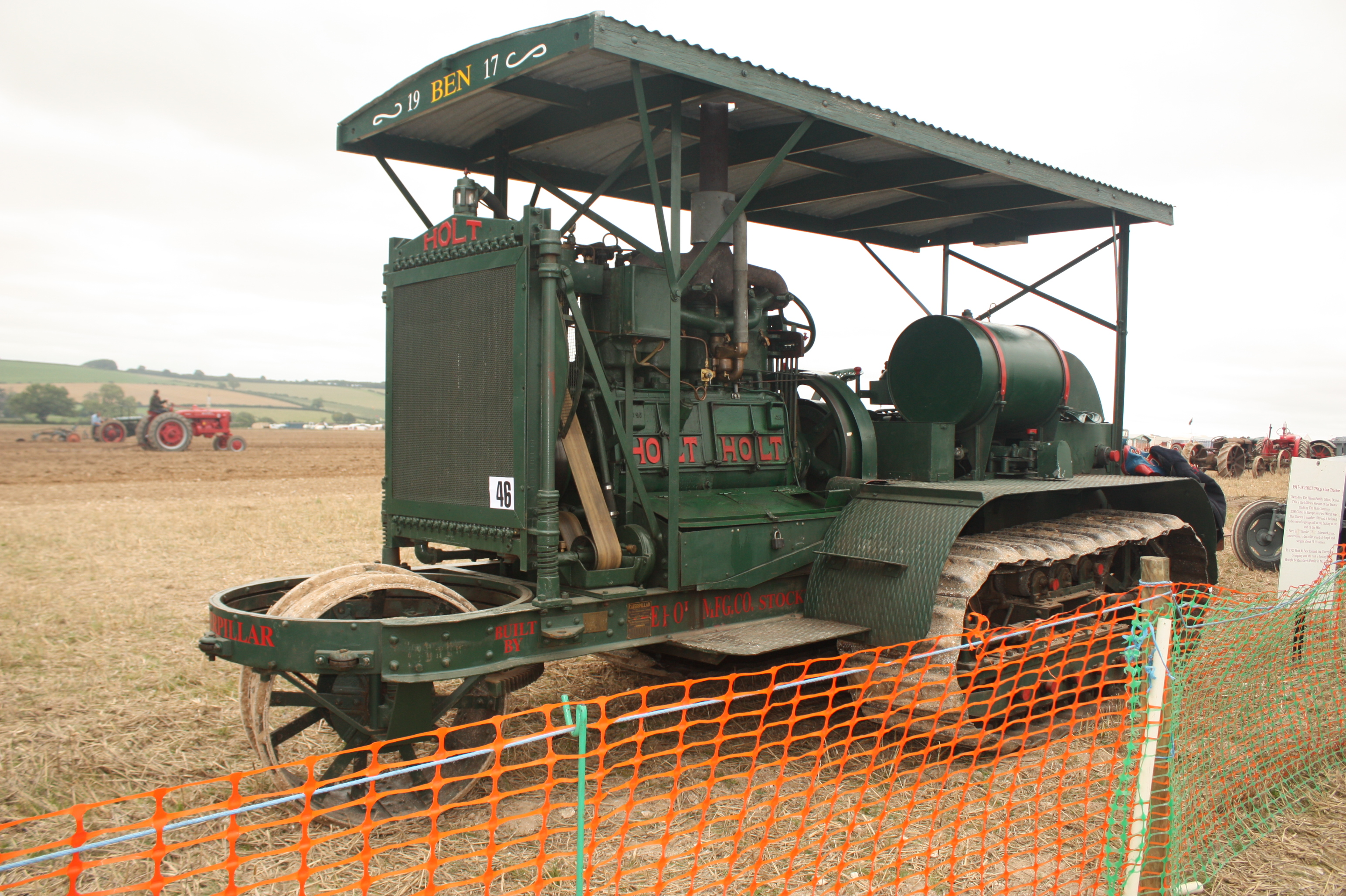
Preserved Holt 75 tractor (s/n 3580) at the Great Dorset Steam Fair, England (2008)

The Holt 75 model gasoline-powered tractor was the first "standard" tractor adopted in quantity. Holt vice president Murray M. Baker reported that the tractors weighed about 18,000 pounds (8,200 kg) and had 120 horsepower (89 kW). The company could not meet the demand for their tractors and licensed other manufacturers to build their design.

Over the next four years, the Holt 75 became a major artillery tractor, mainly used to haul medium guns like the 6-inch howitzer, the 60-pounder, and later the 9.2-inch howitzer.

=== Hauled artillery and supplies ===
The Allies frequently used crawler tractors in place of horses for hauling artillery and other supplies, the tracks often allowing them to negotiate terrain that was impassable to horse teams and wheeled vehicles. The British Army Service Corps also used them to haul long trains of freight wagons over the unimproved dirt tracks behind the front. They were particularly useful in October 1917, when Britain and France each sent six divisions to assist the Italians. Holt 75 tractors ferried the supplies and ammunition over the steep and twisting mountain roads in less than two weeks. Two companies of Holt tractors with the dual role of gun-tractors and supply trains were also used in the Mesopotamia campaign.

=== Influence on development of tanks ===
In Europe, Major Ernest Swinton, sent to France as an army war correspondent, very soon saw the potential of a track-laying tractor. He proposed to Sir Maurice Hankey, Secretary of the Committee of Imperial Defence, that the British build a power-driven, bullet-proof, tracked vehicle that could destroy enemy machine-guns. Holt tractors were "the inspiration for the development of the British tank."

The British War Office carried out a rudimentary trial with a Holt tractor. Several key figures in tank development, including J.B.E. Estienne and Joseph Vollmer, were influenced by Holt tractors and investigated the possibilities of tracked fighting vehicles. They decided not to pursue production of the Holt design and instead independently developed the first British tanks. The French also purchased Holts from the US and used them as the basis for their own early tanks, the Schneider and Saint-Chamond. Later in the War, Holt tractors commandeered by the Austro-Hungarian army and loaned to the Germans formed the basis of the German A7V tank.

By 1916, about 1,000 Holt 75 tractors were in use by the British in World War I. By the end of the war, the British War Office had received 2,100 Holt tractors, about 1,800 of the Holt Model 45 "Caterpillars"; 1,500 of the Holt Model 75 "Caterpillars", and 90 of the Holt six-cylinder Model 120 "Caterpillars", about one-eighth of approximately 5,000 Holt vehicles used by all Allied forces.

=== US tank prototypes ===
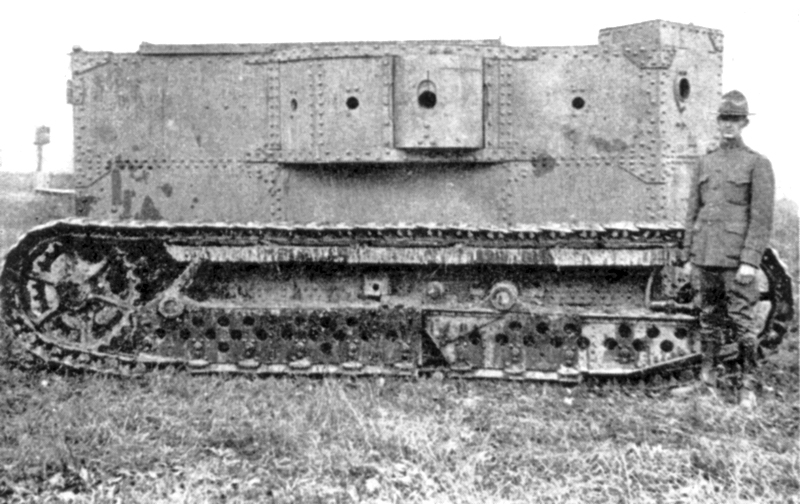
A prototype of the Holt gas–electric Tank of 1918 featuring a 75 mm Vickers mountain howitzer and two Browning 7.92 mm machine guns

In Washington, Pliny Holt supervised the design and building of 10 Ton, 5 Ton, and 2.5 Ton artillery tractors based on the Caterpillar crawler tractor design, at the request of the Naval Consulting board, which work was finally completed in conjunction with the engineers of the Westinghouse company. The first tank Holt built was the Holt Gas-Electric, a prototype utilizing a combined gasoline-electric propulsion. A Holt 90 horsepower (67 kW) four cylinder engine produced power for a G.E.C. generator, which in its turn provided current to drive two electric motors, one motor for each track. It did not progress beyond the prototype stage.

Holt also produced tracked gun-carriers. The first prototype was the "Caterpillar" Mark I Gun Mount, which carried an 8 inches (200 mm) howitzer, weighed 58,000 pounds (26,000 kg) and had a road speed of 1 mile per hour (1.6 km/h) to 4 miles per hour (6.4 km/h). Additional prototypes were produced, including the "Mark II" and "Mark III", and the "Mark IV", which departed slightly from the prior models. Pliny completed a preliminary study of a one-man tank which was later built by the Ford company. The prototypes were rejected after trials found that their size and maneuverability did not offer the relative agility required by a tank for cross-country travel.

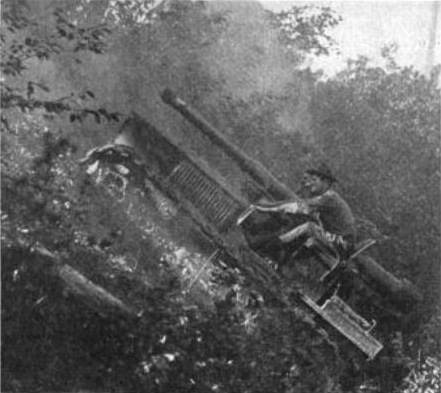
Self-propelled mount for 75mm gun or 105mm howitzer developed by the Holt Manufacturing Corporation

Holt also produced a 75mm self-propelled gun that could travel at 28 miles per hour (45 km/h), exceeding the military requirement of 12 miles per hour (19 km/h), and climb a 45˚ slope. Before the work could be completed, the Armistice was signed and the war ended. Self-propelled artillery did not garner attention again until the end of the 1930s, just before World War II.

During 1919, Pliny Holt returned to Stockton and the Holt company where the "Mark VII" was designed and built. It had a 75 millimetres (3.0 in) gun mounted and ran at a top speed of 18 miles per hour (29 km/h). In 1921, the company finished the "Mark VI", which achieved speeds of up to 31 miles per hour (50 km/h) on a test run from Stockton to San Francisco and back.

=== British acknowledgement ===
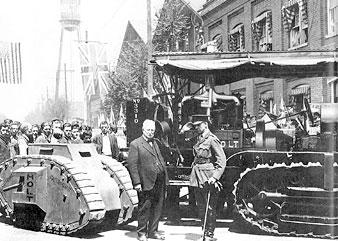
British Colonel Ernest Dunlop Swinton in Stockton publicly honoring the Holt company's contributions to WWI. A mock-up tank is on the left.

In April 1918, British Colonel Ernest Swinton, who had unsuccessfully advocated using the Holt 75 as the base for an armoured fighting vehicle, traveled to Stockton while on a tour of the US, and publicly thanked Benjamin Holt and his workers for their contribution to the war effort, and relayed England's gratitude to the developer of the track. A wooden, miniature mockup of an early British tank, powered by a motorcycle engine, was built especially for and showcased in pictures of Colonel Swinton's visit.

== See also ==
- Murray M. Baker—Holt's first vice-president
- Caterpillar Inc. History
- Three-wheeled steam tank
