= Benjamin Holt =

American inventor

Benjamin Leroy Holt
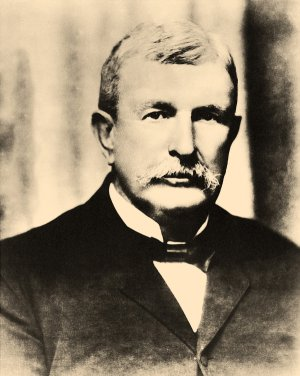
- Benjamin Leroy Holt, before 1920
- Born: January 1, 1849; Concord, New Hampshire, US
- Died: December 5, 1920 (aged 71); Stockton, California, US
- Occupations: Businessman, inventor
- Known for: Patented and manufactured first workable continuous tracked tractor, led to Caterpillar Inc.
- Title: President of Holt Manufacturing Company
- Spouse: Anna Brown
- Children: Alfred B. Holt, William Knox Holt, Anne Holt, Edison Ames Holt, Benjamin Dean Holt

Signature
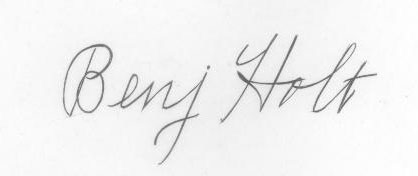

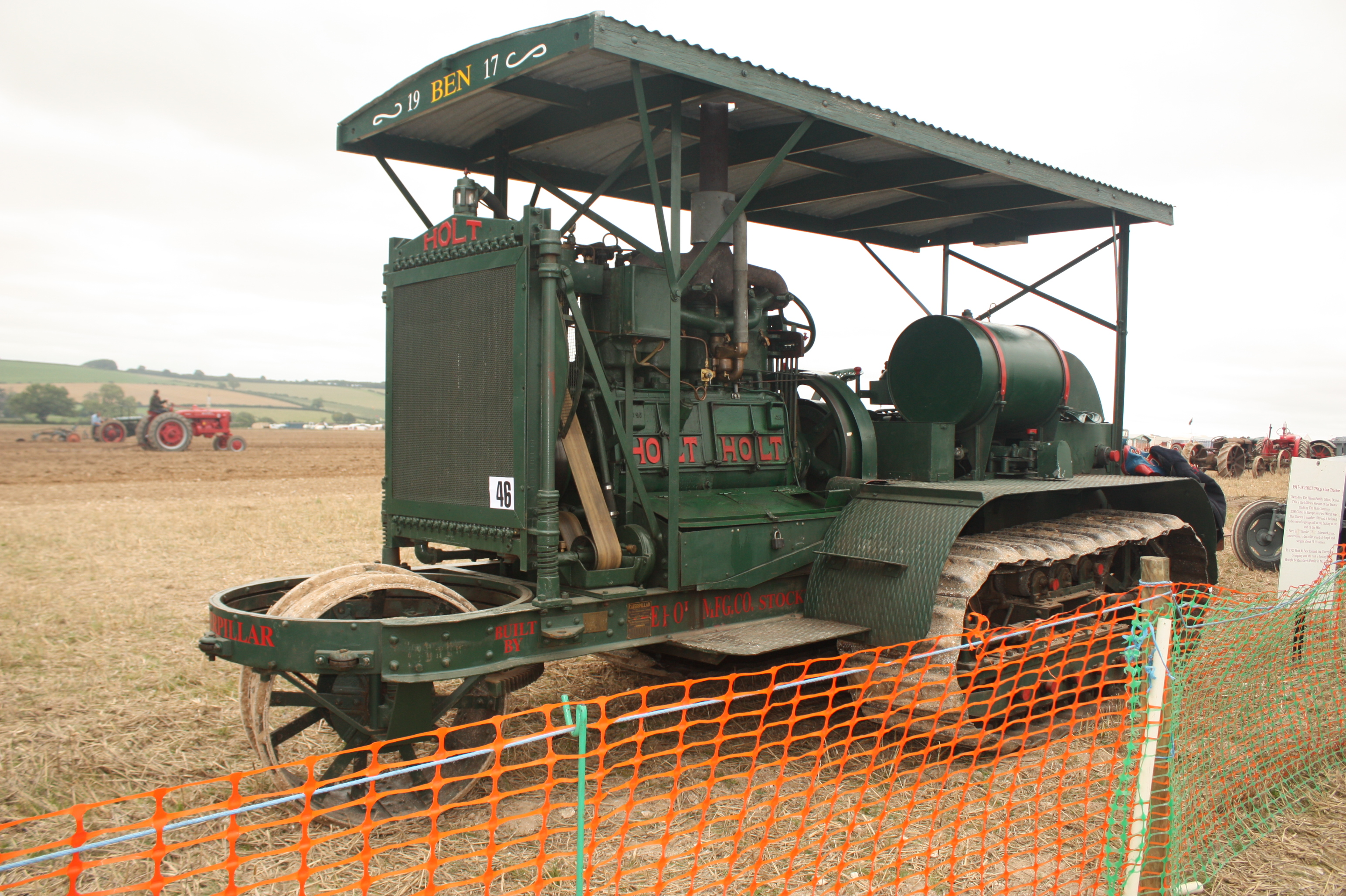
Holt 75 (s/n 3580) on display in England in 2008

Benjamin Leroy Holt (January 1, 1849 – December 5, 1920) was an American businessman and inventor who patented and manufactured the first practical crawler-type tread tractor. The continuous-type track is used for heavy agricultural and engineering vehicles to spread the weight over a large area to prevent the vehicle from sinking into soft ground. He founded with his brothers the Holt Manufacturing Company.

== Early life ==
The youngest of four brothers and eleven siblings, the children of William Knox Holt and Harriet Parker Ames of Concord, New Hampshire. William Knox Holt owned a sawmill that made hardwood for wagon and coach construction. In 1864, Benjamin's brother Charles H. Holt arrived in San Francisco, California, where he founded C. H. Holt and Co. The company produced wooden wheels for wagons and, later on, steel streetcar wheels. Brothers William Harrison Holt and Ames Frank Holt arrived in 1871. The company sold hardwood, lumber, wagon, and carriage materials, primarily manufacturing wagon axles, wheels, and frames. The brothers shipped hardwood from New Hampshire by ship to San Francisco.

In 1869, Benjamin went to work in his father's sawmill, readying hardwoods for shipping to his brothers in San Francisco. In the mill, he trained as a wheelwright. At age 23, he was given an interest in the business, and he managed shipping the lumber to the west coast. His mother died in 1875 and his father died eight years later in 1883. With his parents gone, Holt left for California as well.

Holt married Anna Brown of San Joaquin, California, in 1890.

== Manufactured tractors ==
Benjamin Holt arrived in California in 1883. The Holt brothers formed the Stockton Wheel Company to season woods in a way that would prepare them for use in the arid valleys of California and deserts of the West. They based their new venture in the warm Central Valley town of Stockton, California, where the climate was suitable for drying wooden wheels. They invested $65,000 into a factory equipped with the best machinery available. Stockton, about 90 miles (140 km) east of San Francisco, was accessible by seagoing ship and riverboat via the San Joaquin River. By 1883 the brothers had 25 men on the payroll in a three-story brick building and a one-story wood-frame building in Stockton.

Benjamin was acknowledged by his family as an entrepreneurial and mechanical genius. Most of the surrounding fields were recovered from the delta of the San Joaquin River. Much of it was planted in wheat and Benjamin Holt produced his first horse-drawn "Link-Belt Combined Harvester." This machine used flexible chain belts rather than gears to transmit power from the ground wheels to the working mechanism, reducing breakage and down time. While manufacturing coach and wagon wheels and carriage bodies, Benjamin saw a need for mechanical Traction engines to replace horse-drawn machinery.

In 1890, Holt built his first experimental steam traction engine, nicknamed "Old Betsy". It developed 60 horsepower (45 kW) on a 24 feet (7.3 m)-long frame from a single 11 inches (280 mm)-diameter, 12 inches (300 mm)-stroke piston. It could burn wood, coal, or oil as fuel. Carrying 675 US gallons (2,560 L; 562 imp gal) of water, it weighed 48,000 pounds (22,000 kg) and rode on huge metal wheels. Holt's tractors could harvest large fields for one-sixth the cost of a horse-drawn combine. Foresters soon adapted them to haul Redwood logs out of road-less forests.

In 1892 the Holts manufactured a steam-driven tractor capable of hauling 50 short tons (45 t) of freight at 3 miles per hour (4.8 km/h). Up to this time in America animal power was used to haul goods, so the tractor was a huge innovation. Benjamin Holt became president that year and the company was incorporated as the Holt Manufacturing Company.

One of his next innovations was to produce a side-hill harvester. He added two separate wooden frames which allowed the drive wheels to be raised or lowered independent of each other. This allowed the combine to operate on slopes as steep as 30 degrees while the threshing machine remained horizontally. However, the machine was 36 feet (11 m) wide and required 20 or more horses or mules to pull it.

Benjamin's brother Ames Frank Holt died on October 7, 1889. In 1890, Benjamin married Anne Brown, daughter of Stockton pioneer Benjamin Eseck Brown and Lucy May Dean. Within five years, his two older brothers also died. William Harrison Holt died on February 15, 1904, and Charles Henry Holt died on July 8, 1905, leaving Benjamin in charge. Benjamin and Anne had five children: Alfred, William Knox, Anne, Edison Ames, and Benjamin Dean. William followed his father into the business as an adult.

While over 100 related patents for crawler-type tractor treads had already been issued worldwide, all failed to work in the field. The center of innovation was in England, and in 1903 Holt traveled to England to learn more about ongoing development, though all those he saw failed field tests. Benjamin returned to Stockton and utilizing his knowledge and his company metallurgical capabilities he became the first to design and manufacture a practical continuous tracks for use in tractors. On November 24, 1904, in the fields around Stockton, California, he successfully demonstrated the first successful track-type tractor.

== Use during World War I ==
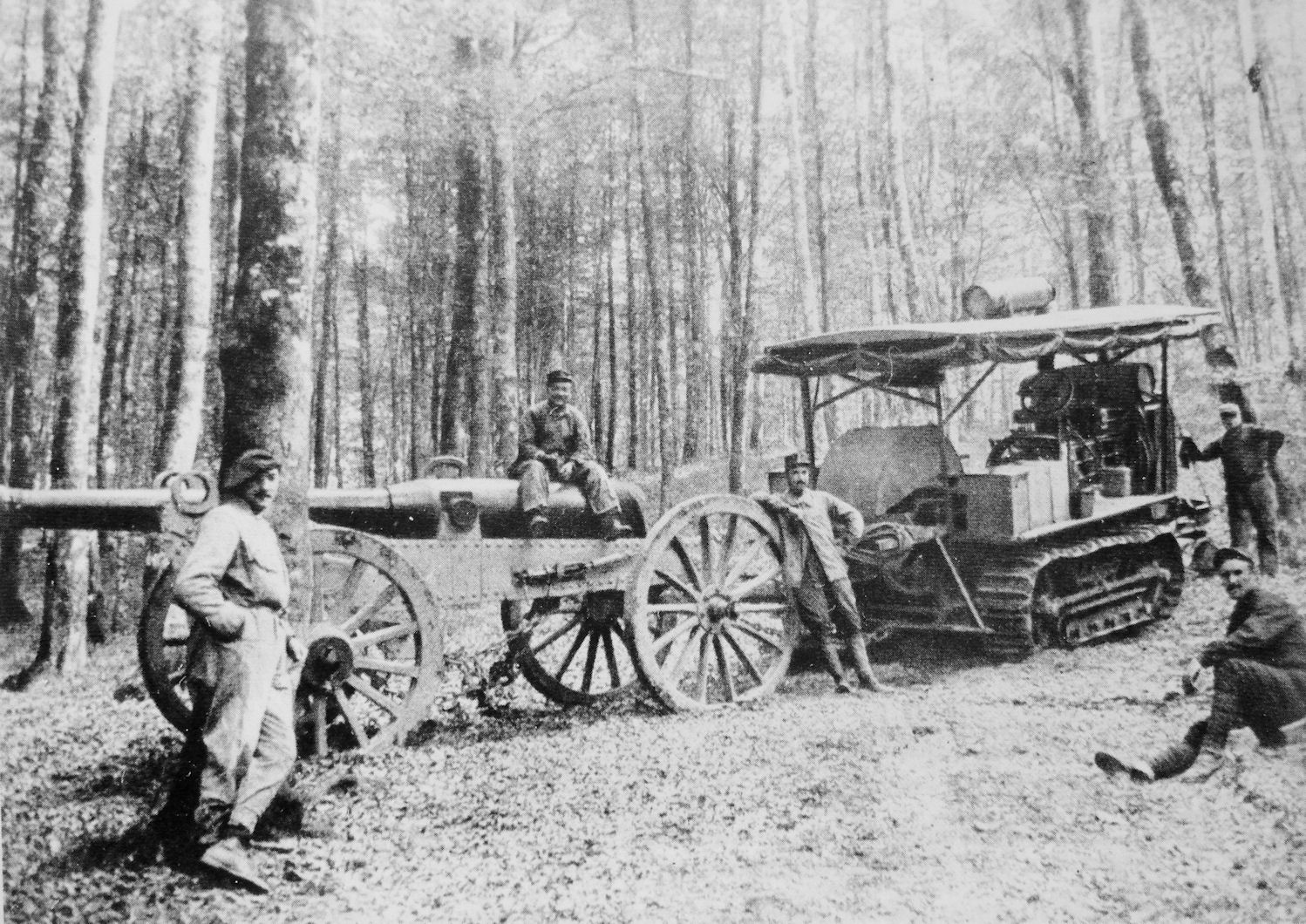
A Holt tractor in the Vosges during the spring of 1915 serving as an Artillery tractor for the French army

During World War I, Holt tractors were used to replace horses to haul artillery and other supplies. The Quartermaster Corps also used them to haul long trains of freight wagons over the unimproved dirt tracks behind the front. Holt tractors were also the inspiration for the development of the British and French tanks, which profoundly altered ground warfare tactics.

By 1916, about one thousand of Holt's Caterpillar tractors were used by the British in World War I. Holt vice president Murray M. Baker said that these tractors weighed about 18,000 pounds (8,200 kg) and had 120 horsepower (89 kW). By the end of the war, 10,000 Holt vehicles had been used in the Allied war effort.

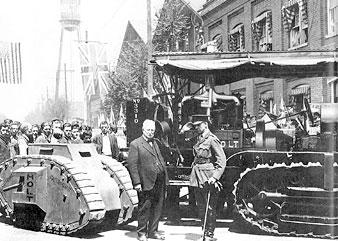
Benjamin Holt (left) with British Colonel Ernest Dunlop Swinton in Stockton, April 1918. The vehicle on the right is a Holt tractor; on the left is a miniature replica of a British tank.

On April 22, 1918, British Army general Ernest Swinton, who is credited for helping develop the tank, visited Stockton while on a tour of the US for the Third Liberty Loan. Swinton publicly thanked Benjamin Holt and his workforce for their contribution to the war effort. During 1914 and 1915, Swinton had advocated basing some sort of armored fighting vehicle on Holt's caterpillar tractors, but without success. Swinton then trained the first British tank units (Although Britain did develop tanks, they came from a separate source and were not directly influenced by Holt machines. After the appearance of tanks on the battlefield, Holt built, with General Electric, a prototype, the Gas–electric tank, but it did not enter production.)

After the war ended, Holt focused less on agricultural machinery and more on producing road-building equipment. On December 5, 1920, 71-year-old Benjamin Holt died after a month-long illness. Five years later, the Holt Caterpillar Company merged with its strongest competitor, the C. L. Best company, to form what is now Caterpillar Inc., the 133rd largest company in the world as of 2008.

== Legacy ==
A street in northern Stockton, California is named Benjamin Holt Drive in his honor. Benjamin Holt College Preparatory Academy, a middle and high school (grades 6–12), is named after him.

The Holt Memorial Hall, dedicated to his contributions to the mechanization of agriculture, opened at The Haggin Museum in Stockton, California in 1976. It includes the second oldest combine harvester on display in the United States (a 1904 Haines-Houser harvester) drawn by a circa-1918 Holt '75' Caterpillar track-type tractor. Both pieces are fully restored.

Benjamin Holt's wife Anna Brown Holt was a Regent of the University of the Pacific in Stockton for twenty five years. His great-grandson Peter Holt and great-granddaughter Corinna Holt Richter operate HOLT CAT of San Antonio, Texas, the United States' largest Caterpillar dealership and one of the largest dealerships in the world. He is best known as the owner of the five-time NBA champion San Antonio Spurs, the WNBA's San Antonio Stars, the AHL's San Antonio Rampage, and the NBA Development League's Austin Toros. Caterpillar Inc. as of 2008 was the 133rd largest company in the world with a market value of US$45.13 billion.

Holt is buried at Stockton Rural Cemetery in Stockton, California.

== See also ==
- Daniel Best
- Civil Engineering
- Bulldozer
- Warren Atherton
- G-numbers Army tractors
- Peter Holt
- Benjamin Holt House
