= BL 8-inch howitzer =

BL 8-inch howitzer can refer to either of two types of British heavy gun:

- BL 8-inch howitzer Mk I–V
- BL 8-inch howitzer Mk VI – VIII
