= David Roberts (engineer) =

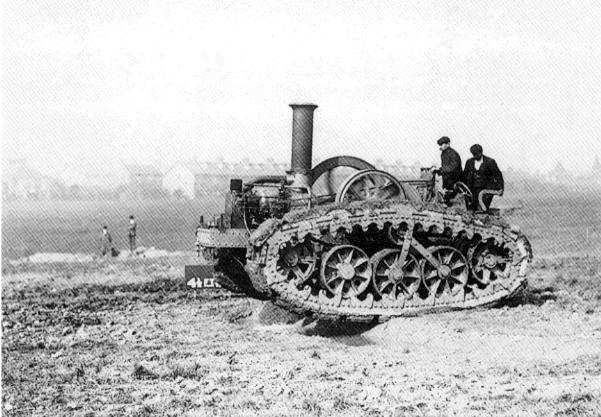
Hornsby paraffin-fuelled, tracked tractor.

David Roberts (1859 – 22 April 1928) was the Chief Engineer and managing director of Richard Hornsby & Sons in the early 1900s. His invention, the caterpillar track, was demonstrated to the army in 1907.

== Chester ==
He grew up in Great Boughton in the east of Chester, the son of David Roberts and his wife Anne, being trained as a hydraulic engineer, starting work for Hydraulic Engineering Company Ltd in 1873, staying with them for fifteen years, living in England and overseas. He worked for Sir WG Armstrong Mitchell & Company Ltd in Elswick, Newcastle upon Tyne from 1888, staying for eight years. For two and a half years, he was manager of their Italian works at Pozzuoli, in the Province of Naples.

== Grantham ==
He joined Hornsbys in 1895 as Chief Engineer, and Works Manager, having been knowledgeable of Hornsbys development of the compression-ignition heavy oil engine and the worldwide engineering potential of it. He became general manager, then managing director in 1904 (until 1918). Whilst at Hornsbys, their manufacturing area grew from 16 acres (6.5 ha) to 80 acres (32 ha). From 1918–20, he was Joint managing director of Ruston & Hornsby Ltd, retiring in 1920. He was Vice-President of Grantham Liberal Club on London Road.

At Hornsbys, his inventions included improvements to the Water-tube boiler.

=== The Caterpillar Tractor ===
In 1903, the War Office offered a prize of £1000 to produce a tractor that could haul a load of 25 tons for 40 miles (64 km) without stopping for fuel or water. Hornsbys entered an 80 horsepower (60 kW) 12-ton tractor, which was the only entrant to complete the 40 miles (64 km), subsequently running on to 58 miles (93 km) before running out of fuel.

Roberts, from this experience of the War Office competition, had the vision to design a vehicle for the British Army which would be able to traverse unstable ground. Vehicles such as Hornsby's 12-ton tractor would quickly be hindered by waterlogged surfaces with wheels sinking in mud. On 23 July 1904, his patent (No. 16,345) obviated this problem, with a vehicle where

two pitched chains of links and pins with cross bars and blocks of metal and wood to make contact with the ground are passed around the front and rear sprocket wheels, one on each side of the vehicle and form a track. The weight of the vehicle body (and engine) is taken by side brackets provided with curved pathways or bearing surfaces resting on rollers which, in turn, are supported on the chains, or on rollers of large diameter revolving on fixed pins. With this arrangement, when the vehicle is running the body is, so to say, rolled forward on the chains. Steering may be accomplished by varying the speed of the driving sprocket wheels on either side of the vehicle.

He submitted four other patents in later years, including No. 16,436 on 14 July 1909, which involved "Improvements in and connected with the Driving Axles of Chain Track Tractors and Locomotives".

In 1905, a Hornsby 20-hp 17-ton tractor was fitted with a chain track. In July 1905 and February 1906, it was demonstrated at Grantham to representatives from the War Office. In August 1906, the 1903 competition-winning tractor was fitted with chain tracks. On testing this vehicle in July 1907, the word caterpillar was first used to describe the machine (by British soldiers). In May 1908, this vehicle was demonstrated to King Edward VII and the Prince of Wales at Aldershot, who were introduced to David Roberts.

Hornsbys bought a 40 hp (30 kW) Rochet-Schneider car, powered by a petrol engine in 1906. It was fitted with a chain track and was trialled by the Army in November 1907 in Aldershot. The 4-ton vehicle achieved speeds of 15 mph (24 km/h) over difficult terrain. Hornsbys, in a rare moment of marketing savoir-faire, commissioned a film of this vehicle to promote the virtues of the caterpillar track, which was to be shown at provincial and London cinemas in the summer of 1908. The film was first shown at the Empire Theatre of Varieties in Leicester Square on 27 April 1908, on a device then known as a bioscope. It was often of more interest than the actual film being shown, and is apparently the first film made for commercial purposes. Roberts was looking at increasing the speed of tracked vehicles. Hornsbys bought a 75 hp (56 kW) Mercedes car and fitted it with chained tracks with wooden wheels to test a desert environment. Tests with this vehicle on Skegness beach in 1908–09 achieved speeds of 25 mph (40 km/h); such speeds with a caterpillar-tracked vehicle would not be surpassed until World War II. In 1910, Hornsbys sold four caterpillar tractors to the War Office—driving the first from Grantham to Aldershot. The tractors were used for towing artillery. Unfortunately, the officers in the Royal Artillery were not enamoured with the vehicle, finding it noisy and slow. One officer wrote, "The team of eight horses in my opinion is far superior under every condition."

Hornsbys thought civilian applications of the caterpillar track would be popular, but they only ended up selling one vehicle. Holt Manufacturing and C.L. Best Tractor Co. (the originator was Daniel Best) of the USA recognised its potential and sold many tracked vehicles; their vehicles were steered by a front wheel, unlike modern tanks. Hornsbys, with no incentives from military orders, did not see the same glowing future for the type of vehicle. They sold the patent to Holt, and only a year later, the British Army ordered 442 of Holt's caterpillar tracked vehicles made under licence by Ruston in Lincoln.

== Family ==
He married Elizabeth Gertrude Anderson (born 1860 in Kingston upon Hull) in 1885, daughter of banker in Hull. They had four sons and a daughter: David (born c. 1887), William (born c. 1888, known as Willie) (both born in Chester), Marion (born c. 1890 in Pozzuoli, Italy), Kenneth (born 1891 in Gosforth, became managing director of the James Coultas agricultural engineering company in Grantham) and Cyril (born c. 1893 in Newcastle). In Newcastle, they lived at Elswick. In Grantham, they lived at 64 London Road. He died on 22 April 1928, aged 69, at his home "Beaconfield" on Beacon Lane in Grantham (the house is now the NHS Beaconfield Psychiatric Clinic). He was made a Freeman of the City of Chester. He was buried in Grantham Cemetery on 25 April 1928.

== See also ==
- Tanks in World War I
