= Best Manufacturing Company =

Tractor manufacturers of the United States

The Best Manufacturing Company (sometimes known as the Daniel Best Company) of San Leandro, California was a manufacturer of farm machinery, known for its steam tractors.

== History ==
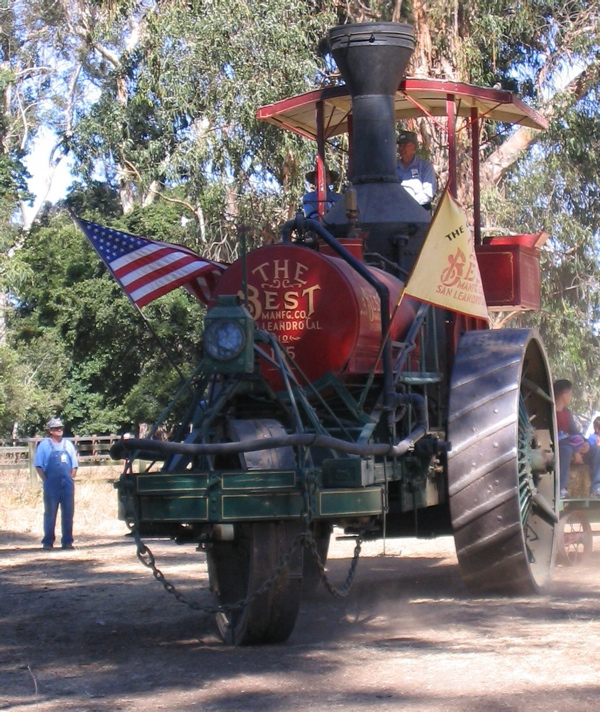
A preserved 1905 Best steam tractor

The company was formed in 1871 by Daniel Best. The company's initial product was a portable grain cleaner, soon followed by a combine harvester. In 1890, the company purchased the rights to manufacture the Remington steam engine, and produced a range of steam-driven farm machinery, including steam tractors and combine harvesters. In 1891, the company built a gasoline powered locomotive for San Jose and Alum Rock Railroad. This was the first internal combustion locomotive built in the western United States, though it was only a limited success and was returned to Best in 1892.

Around 1900 the company built a number of three wheeled road locomotives.

The company was acquired by the Holt Manufacturing Company in 1908 after a legal battle. C. L. Best, the son of the founder then formed his own rival company, the C. L. Best Gas Traction Company which built gasoline-powered tractors. This new company acquired the rights to manufacture the Lombard Steam Log Hauler, an early tracked crawler, and began producing "tracklayer" tractors.

Following fierce competition from the Fordson company, C.L. Best merged with the Holt Manufacturing Company in 1925 to form the Caterpillar Tractor Company.
