= Evergreen Cemetery (Oakland, California) =

Cemetery in Alameda County, California, US

Coordinates: 37°46′19″N 122°10′46″W

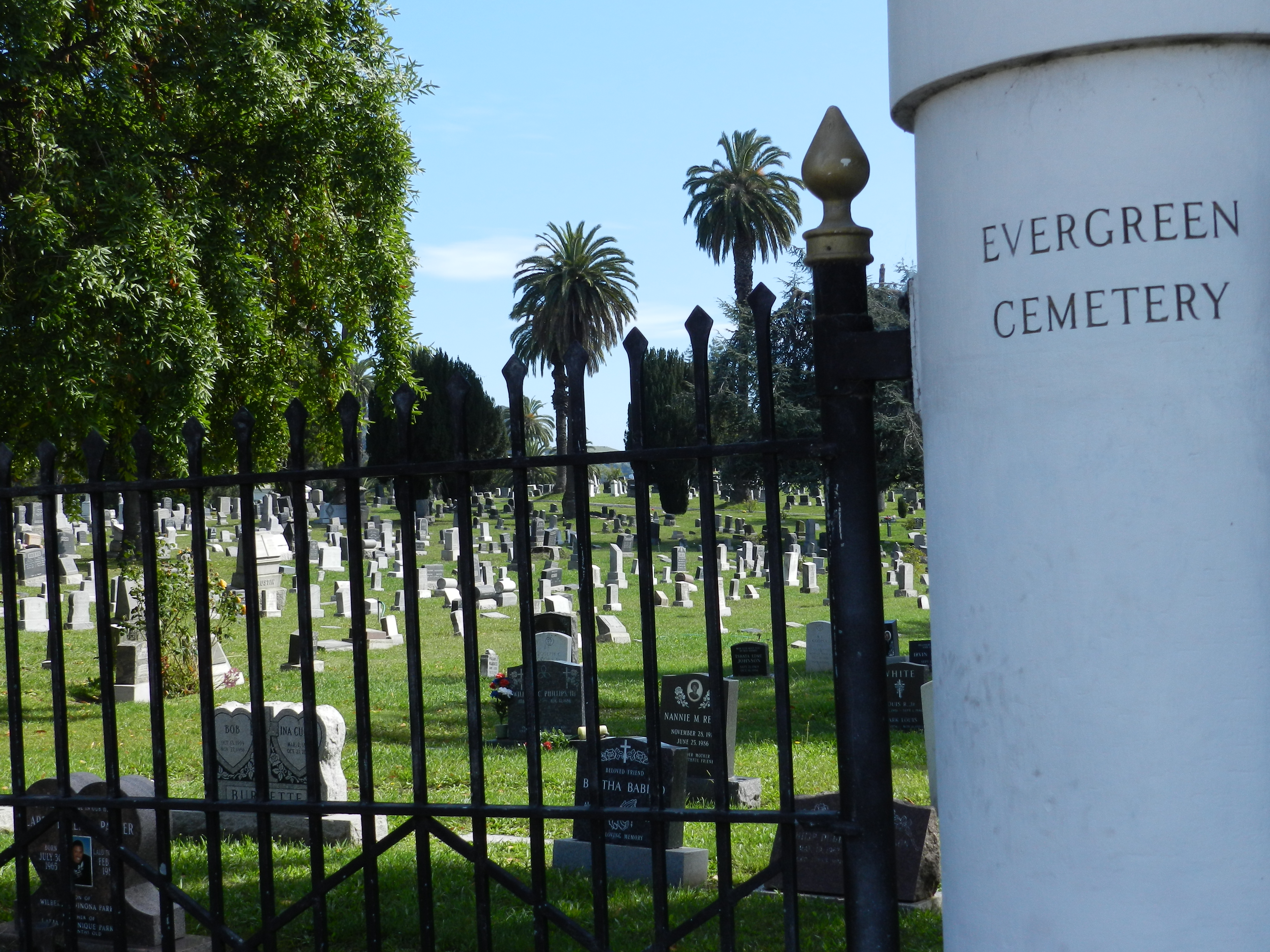
Evergreen Cemetery

Evergreen Cemetery is a cemetery, crematorium and mausoleum located in Oakland, California, near the Eastmont Town Center and Mills College. The cemetery was established in 1903 and is located on a small hill, with a large combined mausoleum, crematorium and chapel at the top of the hill. It is the second largest cemetery in Oakland, after the Mountain View Cemetery and Saint Mary Cemetery complex. It is full, and closed to new interments, but still operates a crematorium.

== Jonestown memorial ==
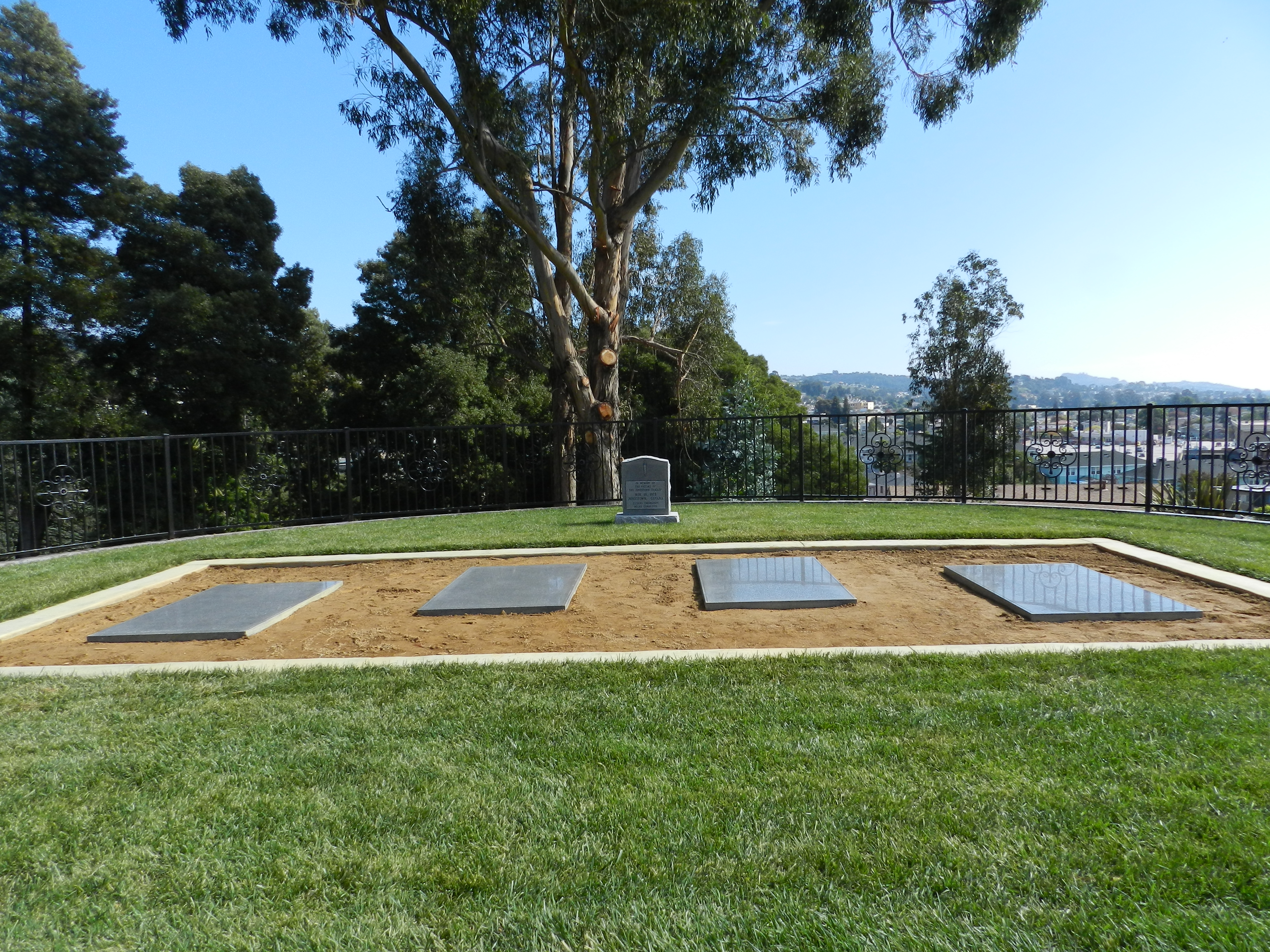
Memorial plaques to the Jonestown mass killing victims

More than 400 unclaimed bodies of the Jonestown mass suicide are buried at Evergreen. In 2011, four additional memorial plaques were placed at the site with the names of all 918 people who died in the incident. The new memorial controversially includes the name of Jim Jones, the leader who ordered the mass murder suicide. Jones’ remains are not at Evergreen Cemetery. The organizers intended the memorial to be "for historical purposes, listing everyone who died there," including the news reporters and Rep. Leo Ryan.

== Notable interments ==
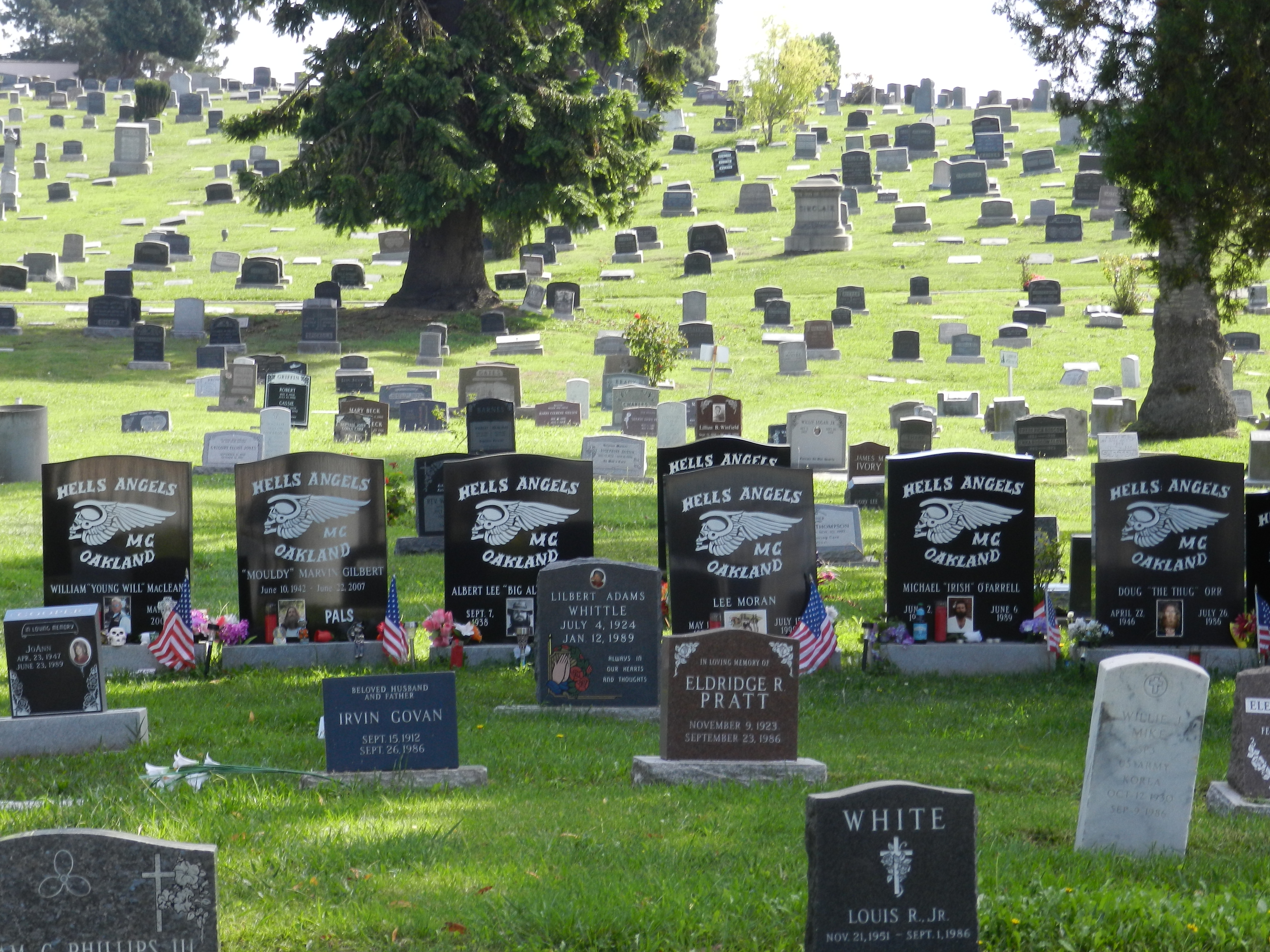
Hells Angels gravesite at Evergreen

Various notable people are buried at Evergreen:

- C. L. Best (1878–1951), son of Daniel Best, Caterpillar Tractor Company executive
- Daniel Best (1838–1923), adventurer and inventor
- Park Van Tassel (1853–1930), aerial exhibitionist, balloonist, skydiver
- Otto G. Foelker (1875–1943), U.S. Representative from New York
- Jesse Fuller (1896–1976), one man band musician
- Earl "Fatha" Hines (1905–1983), early jazz pianist
- Allen Hoskins (1920–1980), child actor who portrayed Farina in the Our Gang short movies from the 1920s
- Henry Kulky (1911–1965), American actor and professional wrestler noted for Voyage to the Bottom of the Sea
- Huey P. Newton (1942–1989), African-American political activist, co-founder of the Black Panther Party
- Irish O'Farrell (1949–1989), Hells Angels leader

There is a section of the cemetery reserved for members of the Hells Angels motorcycle club.
