= C. L. Best =

American manufacturing executive (1878–1951)

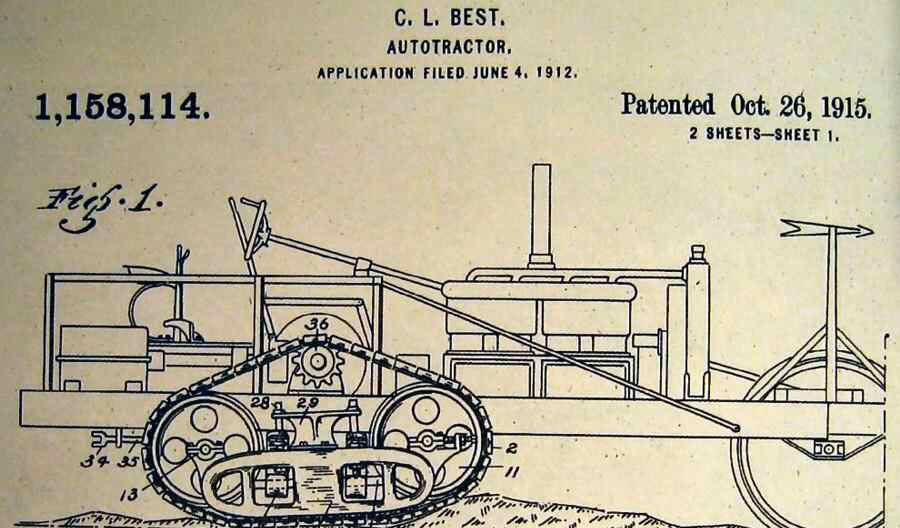
Patent drawing of the C. L. Best autotractor from 1915

Clarence Leo Best (April 21, 1878 – September 22, 1951), better known as C. L. Best, was an American manufacturing executive. C. L. Best founded the C. L. Best Gas Traction Company in 1910 (later the C. L. Best Tractor Company) then merged his company with Holt Manufacturing Company to form Caterpillar Tractor Company in 1925. C. L. Best was chairman of the board of Caterpillar Tractor Company from its founding until his death in 1951.

== Biography ==
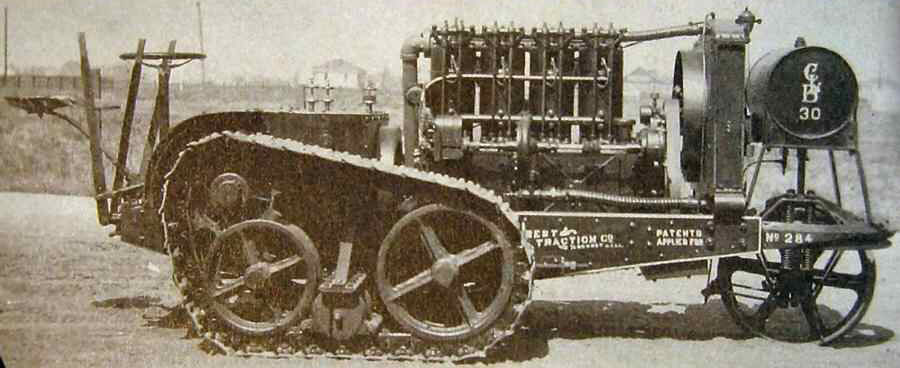
Working model of the C.L. Best autotractor

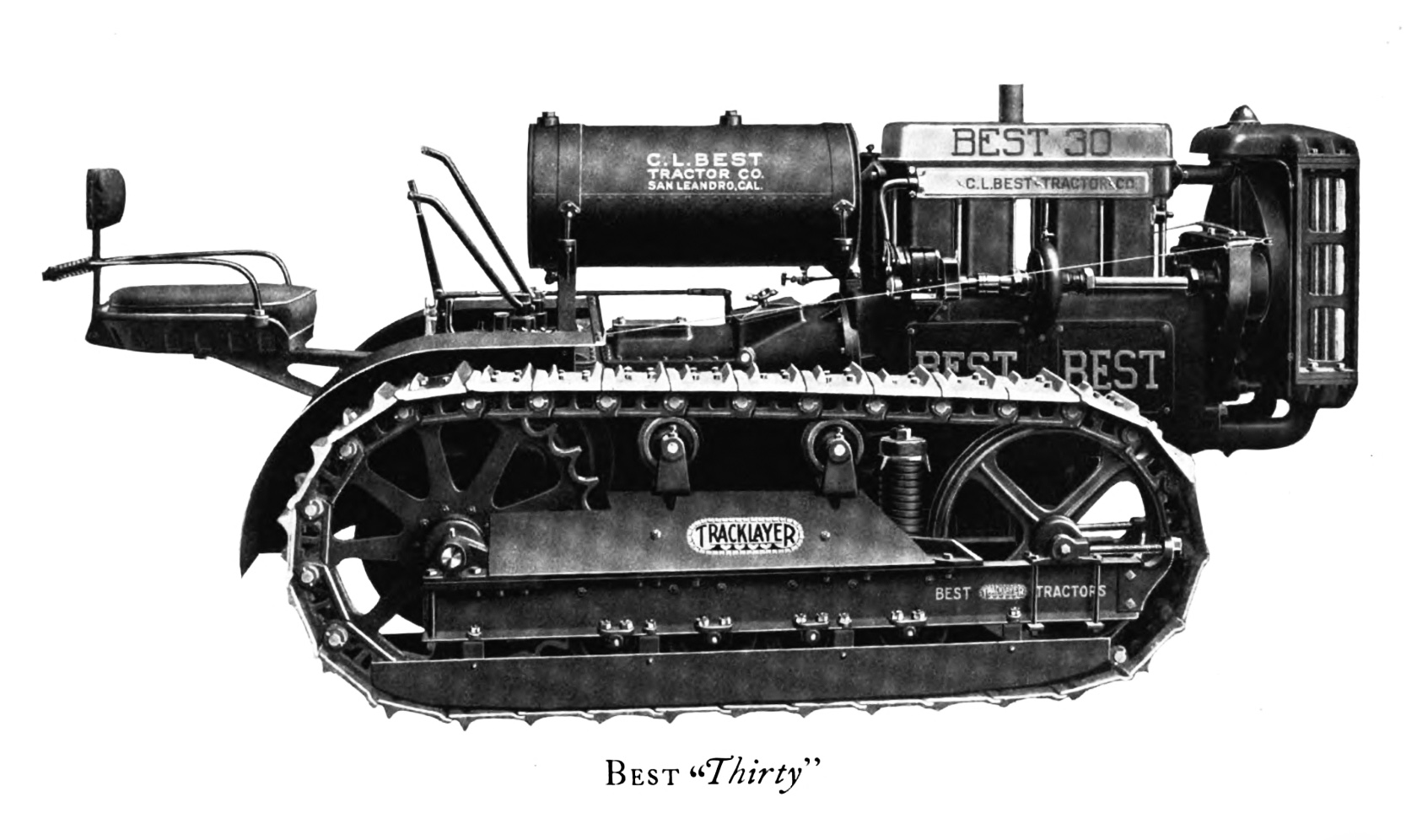
Best 30 (1923).

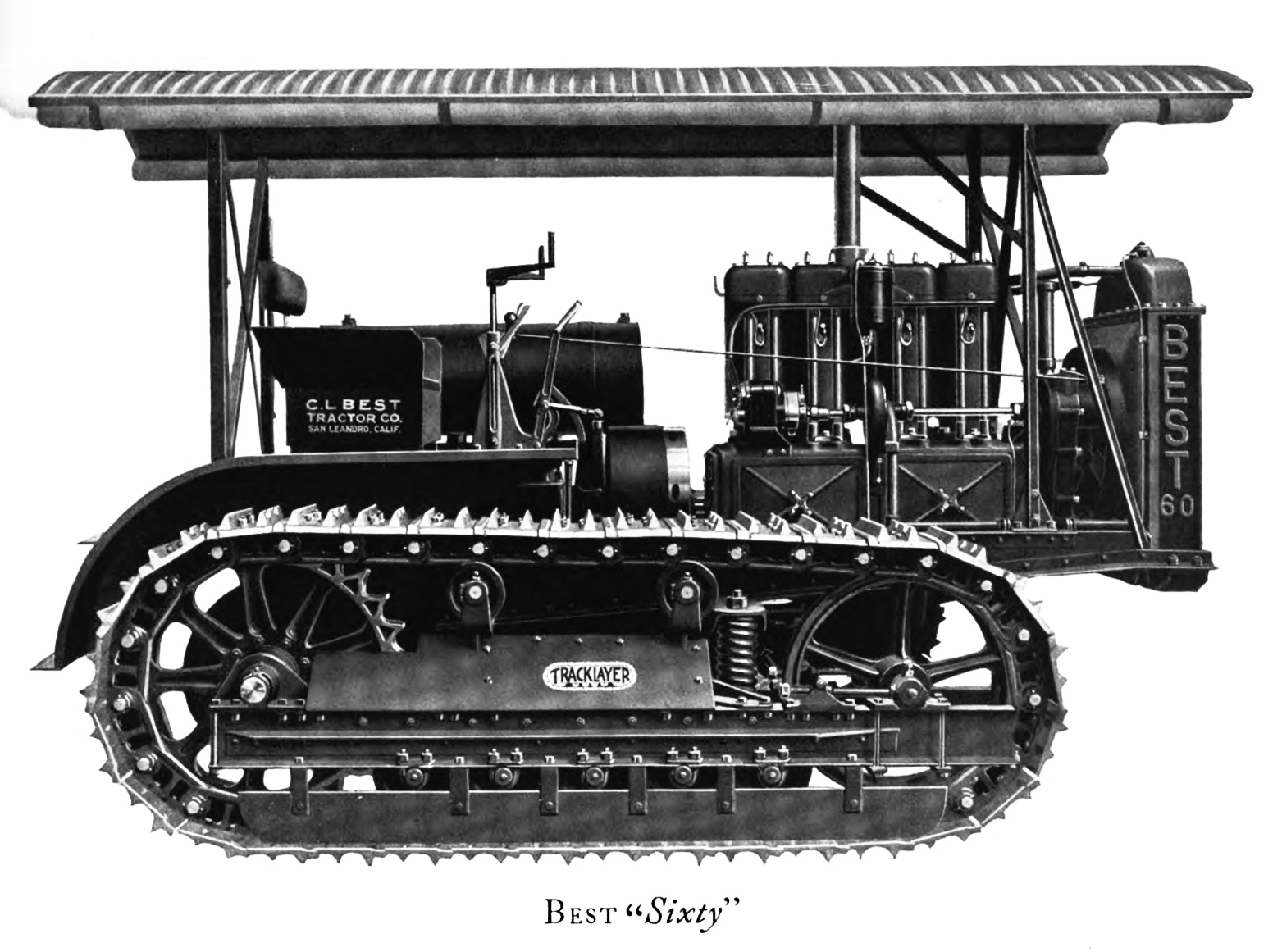
Best 60 (1923).

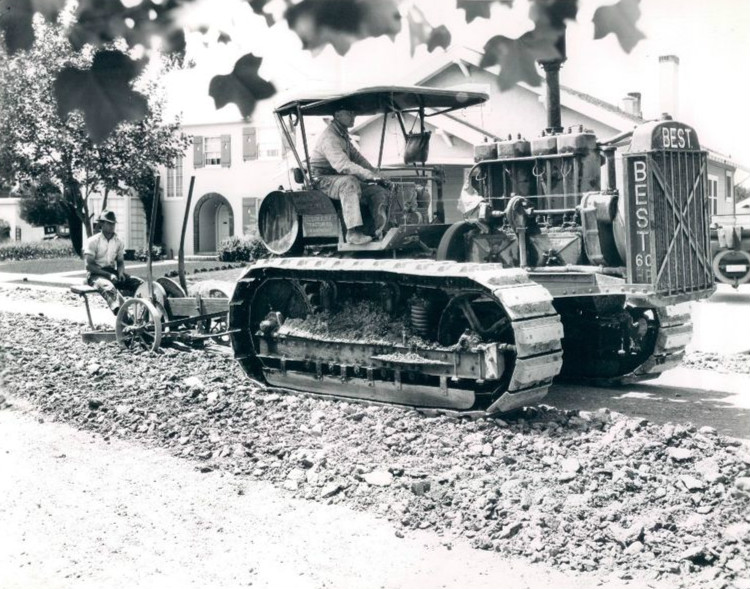
Working model of the Best 60 .

Best was born in Albany, Oregon. He started out working for Best Manufacturing Company, owned by his father, Daniel Best, and eventually became manager of Best Manufacturing Company's Stockton, California, plant.

Best Manufacturing Company was acquired by Holt Manufacturing Company in 1908. In 1910, Best left Holt Manufacturing Company and formed his own company, C. L. Best Gas Traction Company, to continue his father's work. In the area around Stockton, California, over 300 tractors from Best were in use until the end of 1918.

Originally operating out of a plant in Elmhurst, California, the C. L. Best Traction Company became large enough to purchase Daniel Best's former San Leandro, California, plant in mid-1916. In 1920, the C. L. Best Traction Company was restructured and renamed the C. L. Best Tractor Company. The most successful tractor produced was the C. L. Best 60 Tracklayer, later produced as the Caterpillar Sixty.

In the mid-1920s, Holt encountered financial trouble. Best's financial backers approached Holt executives to discuss a merger. On April 15, 1925, C. L. Best Tractor Company and Holt Manufacturing Company merged to form Caterpillar Tractor Company (later Caterpillar Inc.). Best remained chairman of the board of Caterpillar until his death in 1951.

He was interred at Evergreen Cemetery in Oakland, California.
