= Holt 75 =

1913 American heavy tractor

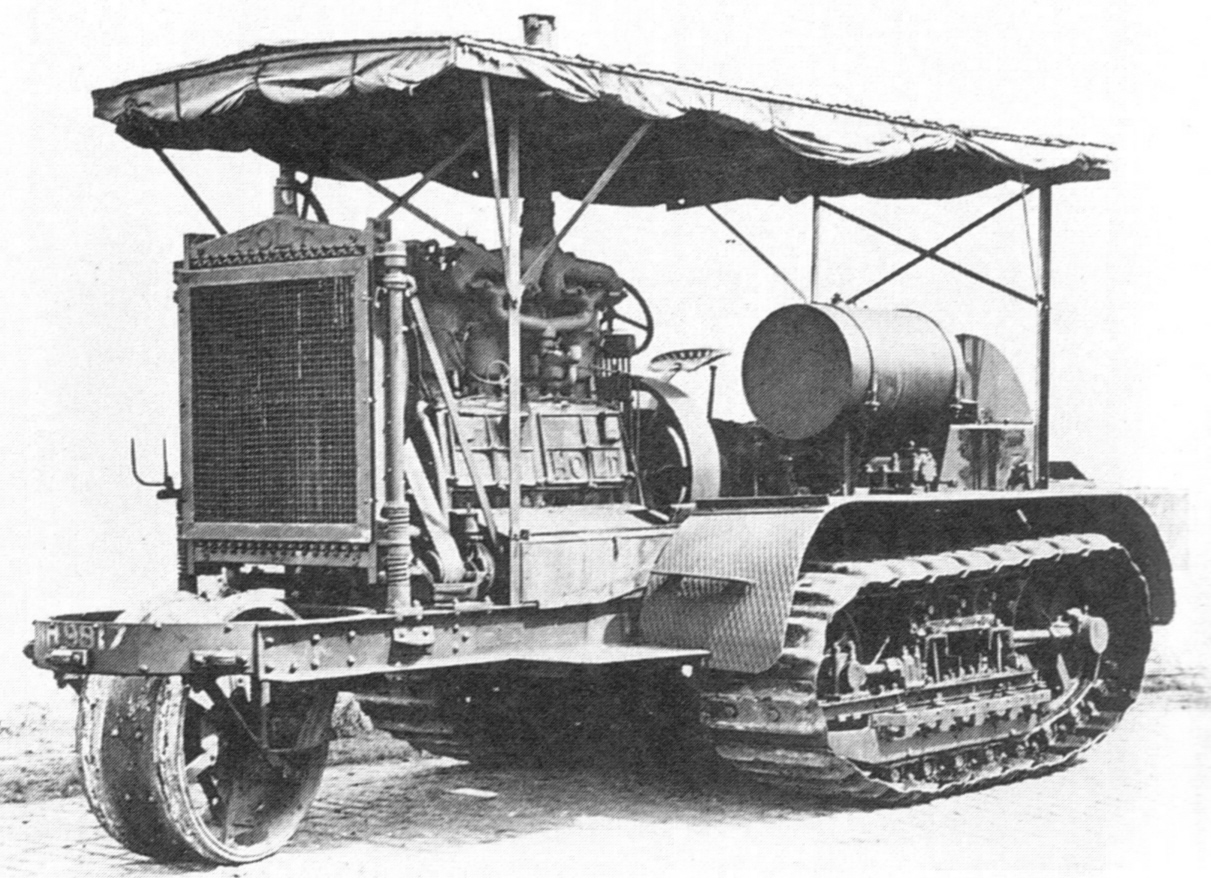
- Type: Agricultural tractor; Artillery tractor; Earthmoving tractor
- Manufacturer: Holt Manufacturing Company; Ruston, Proctor & Co
- Production: 1913–1924 (4,620 built)
- Length: 20 ft (6.1 m)
- Weight: 11.8 short tons (10.5 long tons; 10.7 t)
- Propulsion: Continuous tracks
- Engine model: Holt M-7 4-cylinder petrol 1,412 cu in (23.1 L); 75 hp (56 kW) at 550 rpm
- Transmission: 2 forward, 1 reverse
- Speed: 2 mph (3.2 km/h) laden 5 mph (8.05 km/h) unladen

The Holt 75 was a heavy tiller-wheeled tracked tractor produced by the Holt Manufacturing Company. Produced between 1913 and 1924, 4,620 were built in Holt's two factories in Stockton, California and Peoria, Illinois, as well as under license in the United Kingdom.

The majority of Holt 75s were used in agriculture and civil earthmoving. They also played a significant part in the First World War, serving extensively as heavy artillery tractors in the militaries of the British Empire and the United States.

== Description ==
The Holt 75 was driven by rear tracks, with a single front wheel which was termed a "tiller wheel", effectively making it a half-track. The tiller wheel, which was capable of being turned 90 degrees to the tractor, was used both for steering and to support the front of the machine. The driver's position was located on the right hand side of the tractor, in a position to observe whatever was being towed. The Holt 75 was a large machine for the time, it was 20 ft (6.1 m) in length, 9 ft 8 in (2.95 m) wide and 10 ft (3.05 m) in height, it weighed approximately 11.8 short tons (10.5 long tons; 10.7 t). Military Holt 75s were also fitted with a canopy which provided some protection from the elements, and a capstan winch.

The Holt 75 was powered by a Holt M-7 engine. The M-7 engine was a 4-cylinder petrol engine, it had a 1,412 cu in (23.1 L) displacement, and bore and stroke of 7 1/2 and 8 in (19 and 20 cm), developing 75 hp (56 kW) at 550 revolutions per minute. Somewhat outdated for its time, the M-7 was a reliable powerplant but known for its exceptionally high fuel consumption. The engine could also be idled to such low revolutions per minute that it was possible to count individual revolutions. The first 16 Holt 75s made at Holt's Peoria plant were powered by the Holt M-5 engine, although these tractors proved unpopular and the factory subsequently adopted the M-7 engine fitted at the Stockton plant. The Holt 75 had a two speed transmission, maximum speed was 2 mph (3.2 km/h) when towing a load and 5 mph (8.05 km/h) unladen.

Driving the Holt 75 was very physically demanding and could be quite difficult for the inexperienced. The tractor had no track brakes, and turning required numerous turns of the steering wheel as well as disengaging the steering clutch on one side, which maintained drive to the other side. But for experienced drivers, fine turns were possible utilising only the tiller wheel and the Holt 75 had a very tight turning circle for its day, with the front wheel rotated to 90 degrees and one tracked locked with a wooden block it was possible to turn it in 10 ft (3.05 m).

== History ==
Following the success of the company's Holt 60 tractor, in 1913 the Holt company introduced the larger Holt 75, internally known as the Model T-8. Built initially in Holt's Stockton plant, in 1914 Holt's Peoria plant also commenced production of the Holt 75. The tractor proved to be reliable and soon became popular, particularly for agricultural purposes, but also for road haulage and roadworks.

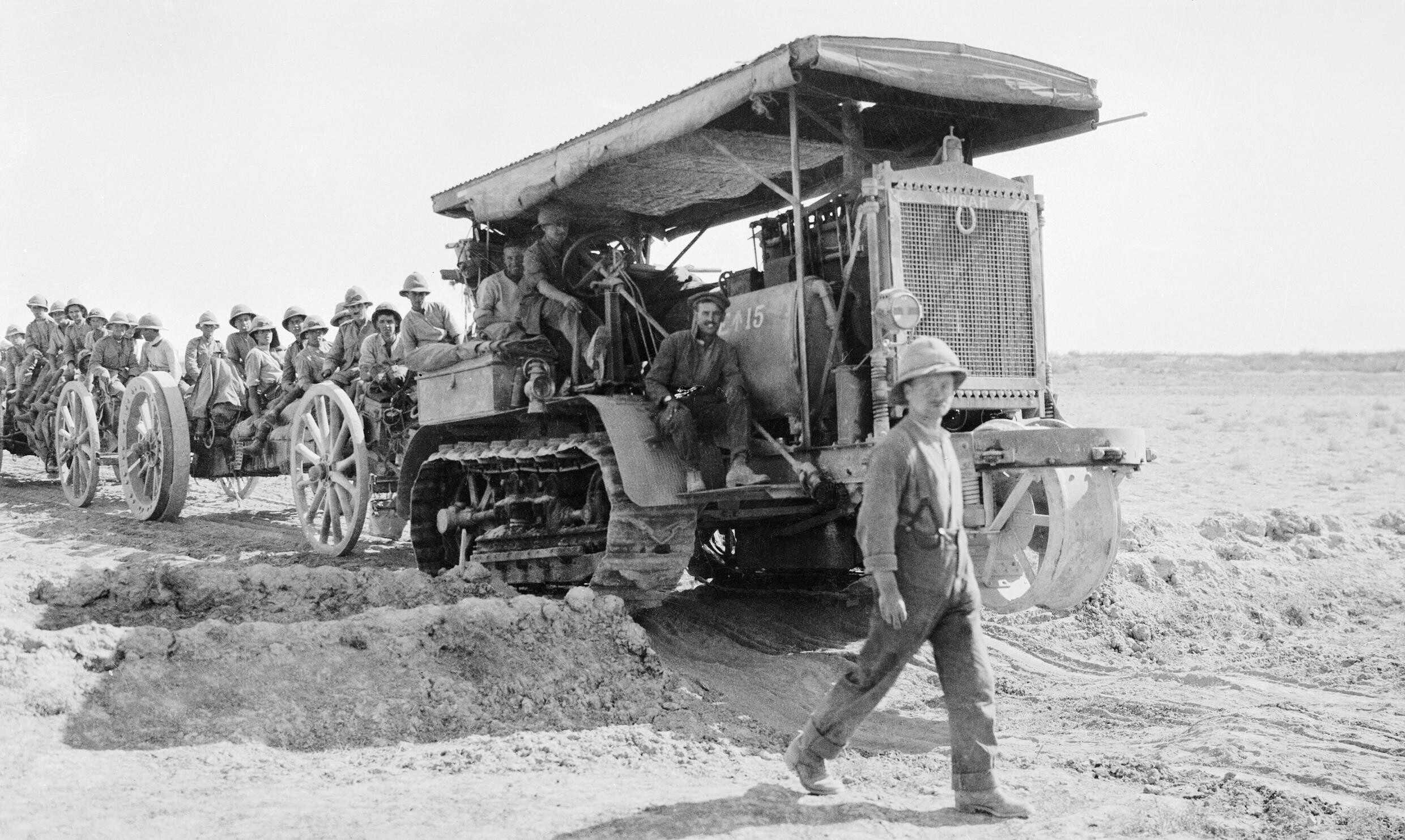
Holt 75 towing a 6-inch howitzer with the gun crew

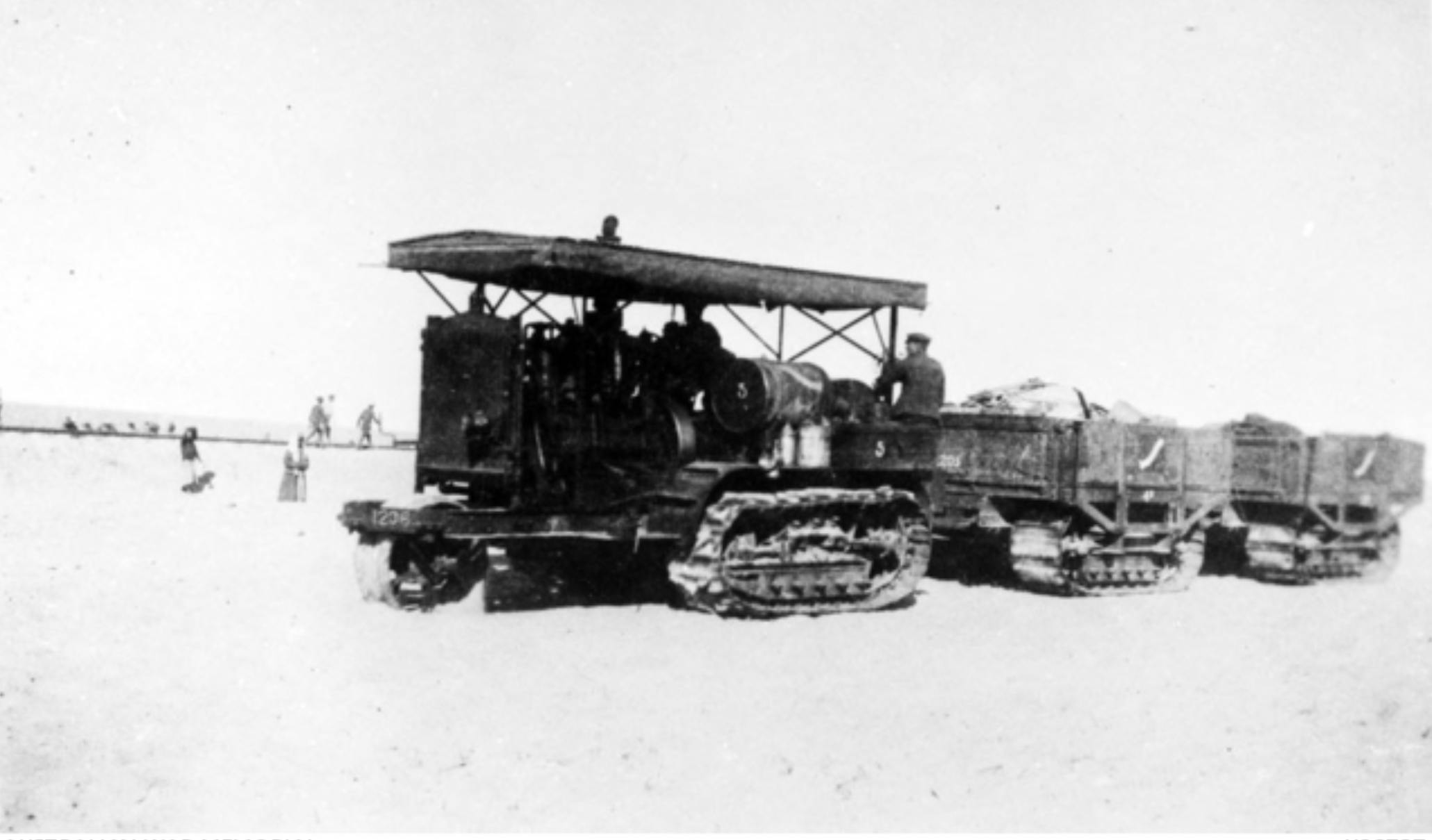
Holt 75 towing two tracked 10-ton trailers built by Holt

Soon after the beginning of the First World War, the British Royal Artillery commenced looking for suitable heavy artillery tractors to haul their heavy artillery pieces, they quickly selected and placed orders for the Holt 75 with the first vehicles being delivered in January 1915. To the British, the availability of the Holt 75 was its primary attraction, with the limited cross country mobility afforded by the continuous tracks a lesser consideration. During the war Holt 75s served with the armies of the British Empire, often referred to Cats (Caterpillars Tractors) they were used to tow medium and heavy artillery pieces such as the 60-pounder gun, 6-inch 26 cwt howitzer, 6-inch gun, 8-inch howitzer and 9.2-inch howitzer, as well as to haul trailers filled with ammunition and other supplies. For supply carriage, Holt also supplied tracked trailers of 10-ton load capacity, two of which were typically towed by a single tractor. These trailers frequently threw a track during turns, which if the combination were travelling downhill could result in rolling of the tractor and both trailers. Wheeled trailers were also trialled with limited success. During the war the British employed the Holt 75 widely on the Western Front, predominantly as an artillery tractor, as well as during the Mesopotamian campaign, predominantly for resupply. Throughout the war the British War Office purchased 1,805 Holt 75s, 1,362 of which were produced by Holt (all at the Peoria plant) and 442 were built under license in the United Kingdom by Ruston, Proctor & Co. Post-war the Holt 75 remained in British military service into the 1920s.

During the war the French Army purchased and tested a single Holt 75 but did not adopt the type, instead purchasing other types.

When the success of the Holt 75 in British military service became apparent, in 1915 the US military tested Holt tractors for the first time. In 1916 the US purchased a number of Holt 75s, using them during the Pancho Villa Expedition to tow trailers of supplies and personnel over 350 mi (560 km) into roadless parts of Mexico. Upon their entry into the First World War the US placed further orders, in US service the Holt 75 was known as the 15-ton Artillery Tractor, and it was used as both an artillery tractor and for resupply. Records show 267 Holt 75s were purchased by the US, 232 of which were sent to France with the American Expeditionary Forces. In 1916 at least one armoured version of the Holt 75 equipped with dummy guns was tested by the US Army for possible use as a tank. Referred to as the "Holt 75 Tank" the Holt company were not involved in the project.

Holt continued producing the Holt 75 after the war with sales remaining strong for some time, and in 1921 the final design changes were implemented to the tractor. After 1921 production was confined to the Stockton plant, ceasing in 1924. In total approximately 4,620 were produced including the 442 produced by Ruston, Proctor & Co.

== See also ==
- Holt tractors of the First World War
