= Murray M. Baker =

American businessman

- Born: Murray Morrison Baker; 1872; Alton, Illinois, USA
- Died: August 5, 1964 (aged 91–92); Peoria, Illinois, USA
- Known for: First Executive VP of Holt Manufacturing Company
- Spouse: Mary Lyman (m. 1904)
- Children: 3

Murray Morrison Baker (1872–1964) was the first executive vice president of Holt Manufacturing Company that became Caterpillar Tractor Company.

== Personal life ==
Baker owned a home at 1222 W. Moss in the West Bluff neighborhood of Peoria, Illinois. He married Mary Lyman of La Grange, Illinois in 1904; she died in 1957.

== Career ==
Baker was a farm implements dealer. He worked with Deere and Co. in St. Louis in 1890.

In 1908, the Colean Co., a steam-powered tractor firm went bankrupt and its plant went up for sale. Baker alerted Pliny Holt of Holt Manufacturing Company to the opportunity. Baker joined the Holt Manufacturing Company in 1909 and became vice president and general manager. Baker helped the company secure military contracts during World War I, which helped the company grow four-fold.

In 1917, he was involved in building a seven-mile stretch of Illinois Route 116 in East Peoria. During World War II, he advocated for a new bridge over the Illinois River between Peoria and East Peoria.

Baker worked at Caterpillar until 1927.

Baker also influenced R.G. LeTourneau to bring his business to Peoria in 1935, at the Avery Manufacturing Co. site on NE Adams Street which is present-day Komatsu plant.

Baker served on the Caterpillar Board for over 40 years, from 1925 to 1957.

=== Philanthropy ===
Baker contributed funds to Bradley University, St. Paul’s Episcopal Church, Proctor Hospital, and Methodist Hospital.

== Death ==
Baker died at the age of 92.

== Legacy ==
The Murray Baker Bridge, which carries Interstate 74 over the Illinois River, was named for Baker in 1956. The bridge was dedicated on Dec. 12, 1958.

Baker Hall, former home of the Foster College of Business Administration at Bradley University, was named for Baker and demolished in 2017.
