= BL 8-inch howitzer Mk I–V =

Series of British heavy howitzers

BL 8-inch howitzer Mk V
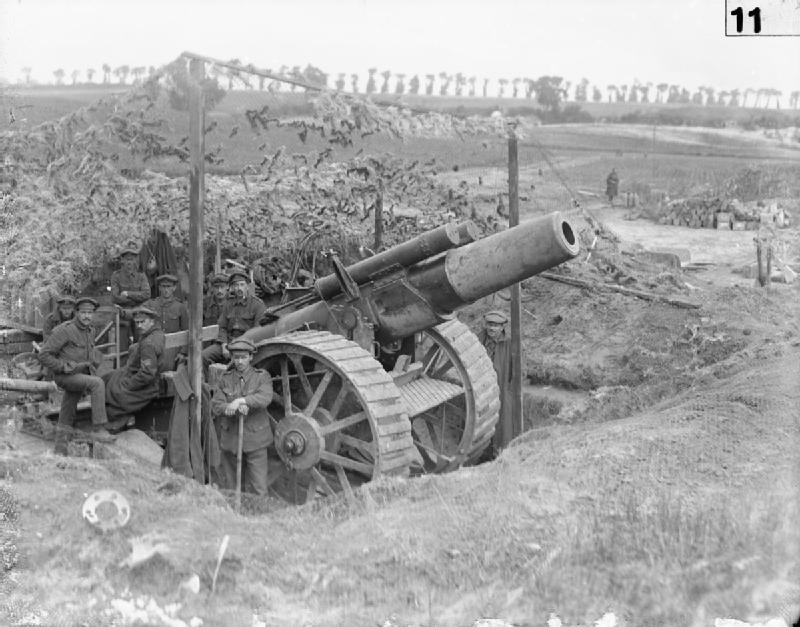
- Eight-inch howitzer Mk V near Carnoy, Battle of Albert, July 1916
- Type: heavy howitzer
- Place of origin: United Kingdom

Service history
- In service: 1915−1918
- Wars: World War I

Production history
- Designer: Major M L Wilkinson, RGA
- No. built: 91

Specifications
- Mass: Gun & Breech: 5 Long tons Total: 13.5 Long tons
- Barrel length: Bore: 9 ft 10 in to 10 ft 5 in (3.00−3.18 m); Total: 10 ft 8 in to 11 ft 4 in (3.25−3.45 m)
- Shell: HE : 200 lb (91 kg), bagged charge
- Calibre: 8 inches (203 mm)
- Recoil: Hydro-spring constant. 18-, 13- or 13.25-inch
- Elevation: -5°−45°
- Traverse: nill
- Muzzle velocity: Maximum: 1,301 ft/s (397 m/s)
- Maximum firing range: 10,500 yd (9,600 m)

The BL 8-inch howitzer Mark I through to Mark V (1 to 5) (Note: I.e. models 1 through 5. Britain used Roman numerals to designate "Marks" or versions of guns until after World War II. Hence this article describes the first five models of British BL 8-inch howitzer.) were a series of British howitzers developed early in the First World War. They used shortened and bored-out barrels from various redundant naval 6-inch guns. The guns did not bear any relation to the later 8-inch howitzers of the First World War, the Vickers-designed 8-inch Mark VI to VIII howitzers which succeeded it.

== History ==
The weapon entered service in February 1915.

The Mark I–V had many relatively minor differences in the carriages and trails and Mk IV, Mk VI and QF Mk II 6-inch naval gun barrels were used. (Note: Mk I used barrels from BLC guns Mk I/IV; Mk II & III used barrels from BL Mk IV or VI; Mk IV used BLC Mk I/VI adapted for Mk IV carriage; Mk V used QF Mk II barrels converted to BL (total of 63). Details from Clarke 2005, page 34, and Tony DiGiulian's website Britain 6"/40 (15.2 cm) QF Marks I, II and III) However, the ballistic characteristics, propellant charges and shells used were similar for all Mks I–V. They are easily identified by their short thick barrel and twin recoil buffers above the barrel.

Mks I–IV were no longer repaired from summer 1917 onwards.

== Combat use ==
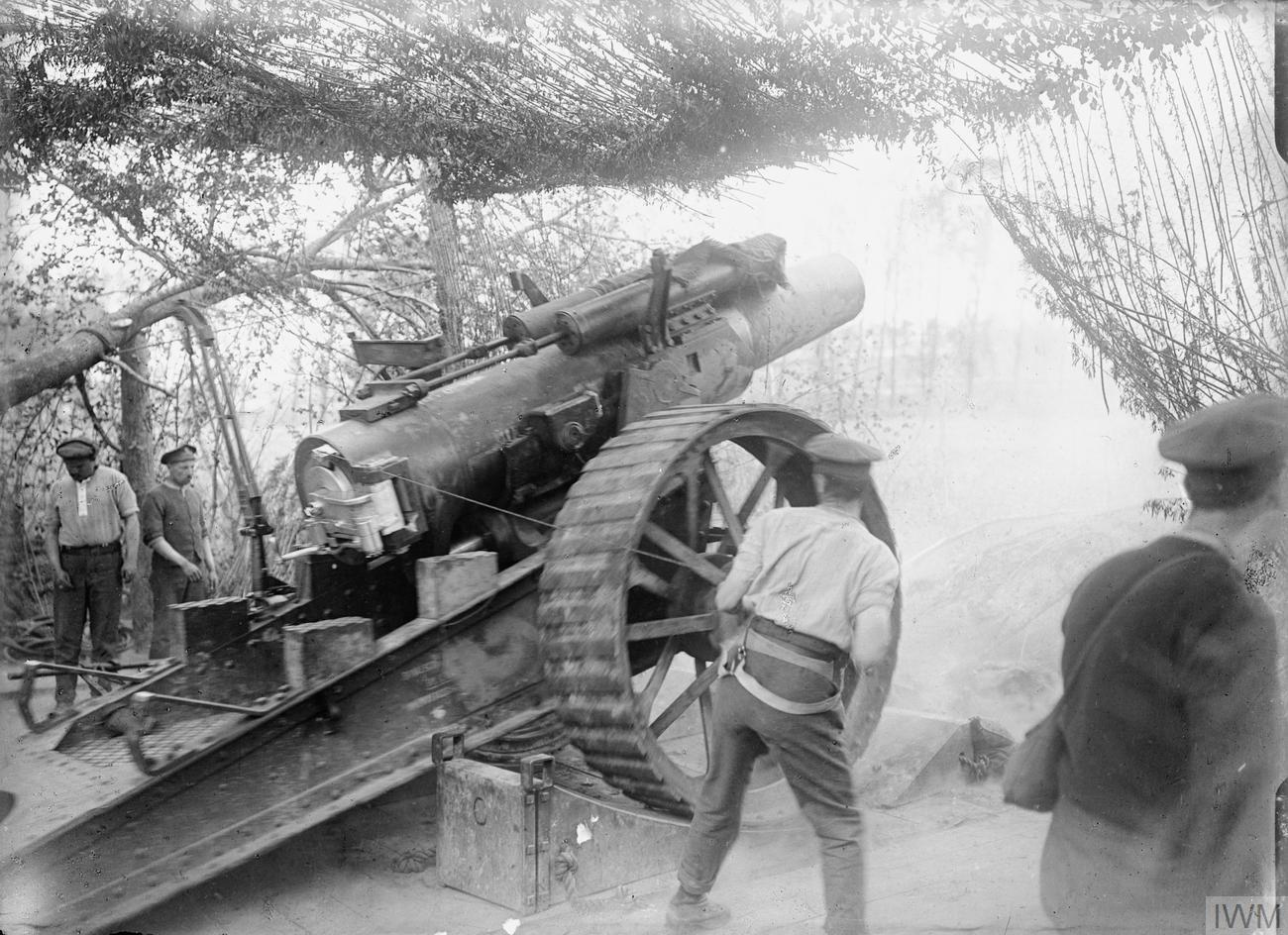
At almost full recoil after firing

They were operated by siege batteries of the Royal Garrison Artillery (RGA). Holt 75 tractors were used to tow them into position.

Mks I–V were limited by a short range and high weight, being 4–5 tons heavier than the succeeding Mk VI which was designed as a howitzer and hence had a much lighter barrel.

The improvised nature of the design led to failures such as premature explosion and unreliability in action, and difficulties of maintenance in workshops. There were also early quality-control problems with British mass production of ammunition in 1915 and early 1916 : "the 8-inch fuses failed so often that the battlefield was littered with unexploded 8-inch shells".

Despite their shortcomings they were generally considered a success :

"They were monstrous things and extremely heavy, but the machinery of the guns was very simple and that's why they did so extremely well and didn't give nearly as much trouble as some of the more complicated guns that came to appear later on. One was the very first to be made and it was marked, 'Eight-inch Howitzer No. 1 Mark I' so we called that gun, 'The Original'. It was marvellously accurate". Second Lieutenant Montague Cleeve, 36th Siege Artillery Battery, Royal Garrison Artillery.

They remained in use on the Western Front throughout the First World War as Britain's need for heavy artillery increased and was never fully met by production of modern equipment.

== Photo gallery ==
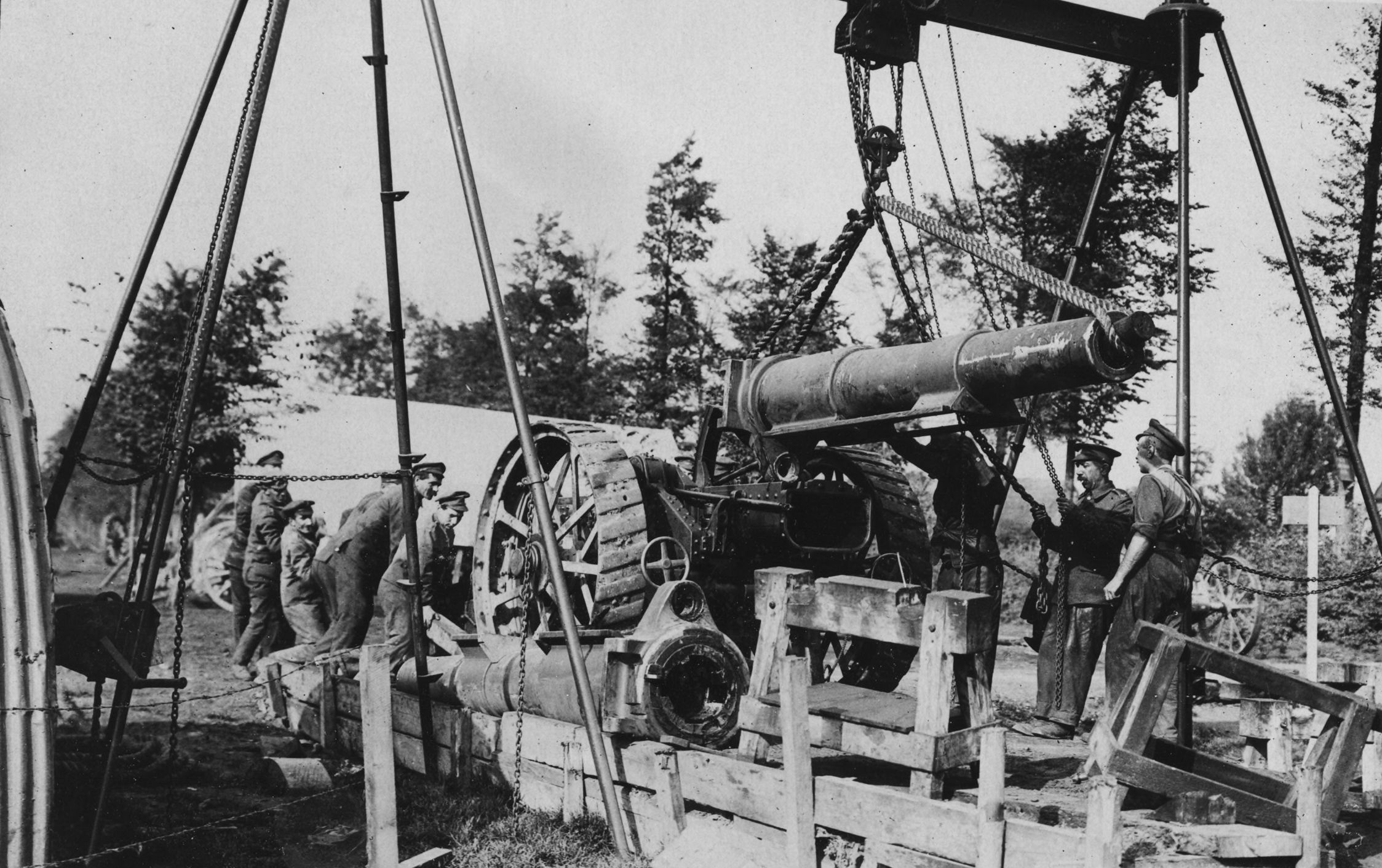
Changing a barrel, which occurred frequently. Battle of Polygon Wood, September 26, 1917

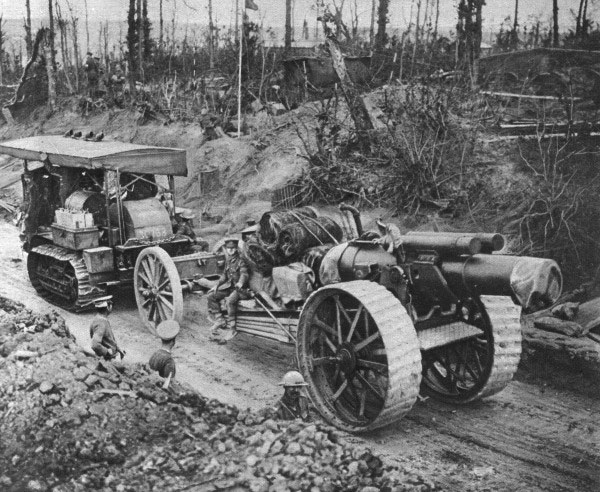
Being towed by a Holt 75 artillery tractor, Somme 1916

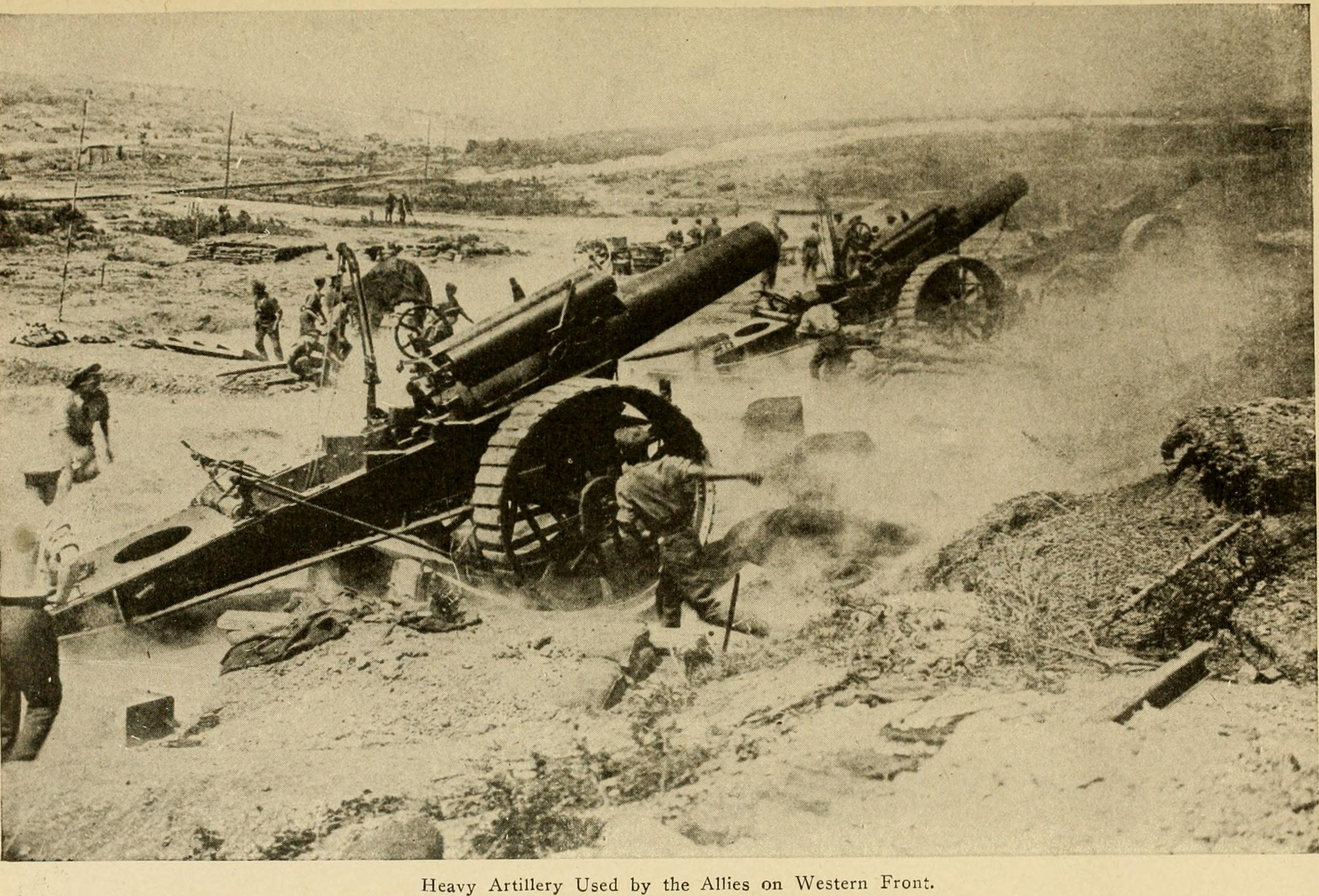
Three 8-inch howitzers in action

== See also ==
- BL 8-inch howitzer Mk VI – VIII British successor
- List of howitzers

=== Weapons of comparable role, performance and era ===
- 21 cm Mörser 10 Approximate German equivalent

== Bibliography ==
- Dale Clarke, British Artillery 1914–1919. Heavy Artillery. Osprey Publishing, Oxford UK, 2005 ISBN 1-84176-788-3
- General Sir Martin Farndale, History of the Royal Regiment of Artillery. Western Front 1914–18. London: Royal Artillery Institution, 1986 ISBN 1-870114-00-0
- I.V. Hogg & L.F. Thurston, "British Artillery Weapons & Ammunition 1914–1918". London: Ian Allan, 1972.
- Peter Hart, "The Somme". London: Cassell Military Paperbacks, 2006. ISBN 978-0-304-36735-1
