= Daniel Best =

American businessman and adventurer

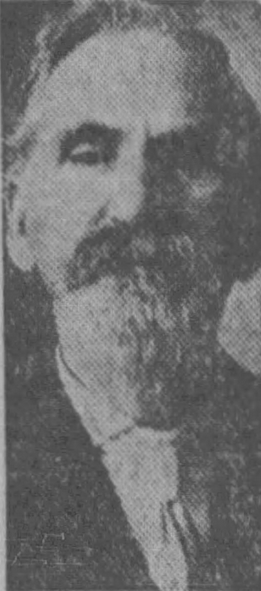
- Born: March 20, 1838; Tuscarawas County, Ohio
- Died: August 22, 1923 (aged 85); Oakland, California
- Resting place: Evergreen Cemetery
- Occupations: Adventurer, businessman, farmer, inventor
- Spouse: Meta Johanna Steinkamp (m. 1872; died 1894)
- Children: 9, including C. L. Best

Daniel Best (March 20, 1838 – August 22, 1923) was an American adventurer, businessman, farmer, and inventor known for pioneering agriculture machinery and heavy machinery.

== Early years ==
In 1839, Best's father, John, moved the family to Missouri, where he built a saw mill to cut lumber for the local pioneers. Daniel Best spent the first nine years of his life here, before the family moved again in 1847 to Lee County, Iowa, where they took up farming and raised stock. In 1859, Daniel, following his brother, joined a wagon train heading west to Fort Walla Walla, Washington Territory where he was employed as an ox-tender and sharpshooter.

== Life in the West ==
In Washington Territory, Best was involved in gold mining, followed by working in sawmills and eventually building his own sawmill.

While working in his sawmill, he lost the first three fingers of his left hand, which he later said made him begin to "use his head". He then moved to Sutter County, California to work on the ranch owned by his brother Henry Best, where he began inventing machines.

== Inventions ==
Over a period of 43 years, Best received 41 patents, including an improved washing machine and combine harvesters. His first invention, patented April 25, 1871, was a portable grain cleaner and separator. Farmers had previously had to haul their grain into town to have it cleaned and separated, but the cleaner and separator could now be brought to the grain. The machine won first prize at the California State Fair in 1871.

While continuing to produce grain cleaners, Daniel began working on a single machine that could combine grain harvesting, threshing, and cleaning. He sold his first horse-powered combined harvester in 1885, using the money from sales of this machine to invest in work on an improved design for a traction engine.

=== Gasoline engine ===
Around 1891, Best began to experiment with gas engines, developing his Duplex engine at the end of that year.

In 1892, he built a gasoline-powered locomotive for the San Jose and Alum Rock Railroad. It was powered by his Duplex Vapor Engine. The following year he delivered a similar locomotive to the Marysville and Yuba City Railway. Although these locomotives were not successful, they were among the first gasoline locomotives in commercial use in the United States.

=== Traction engine ===
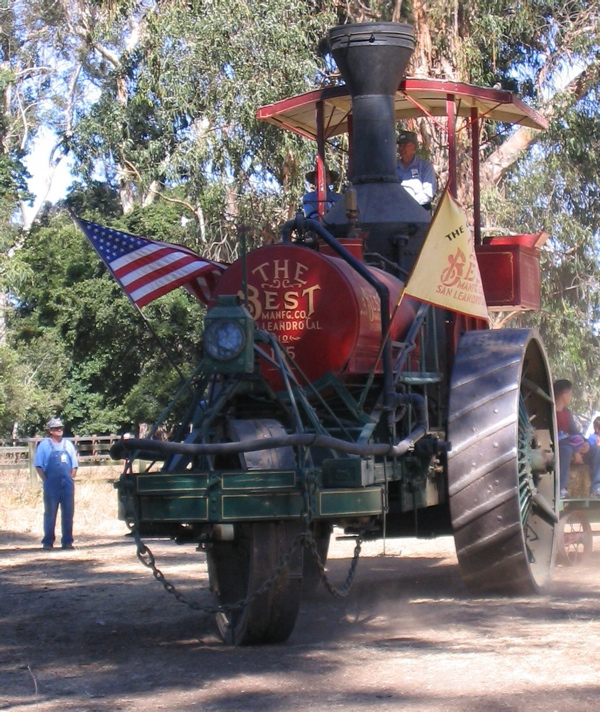
A preserved 1905 Best steam tractor

Best saw the need for an improved traction engine (now also known as a steam tractor) to pull his combine harvesters. He first purchased the rights to build a steam traction engine from Remington of Woodburn, Oregon in 1888, before making improvements to the design.

He developed his first gas-powered tractor in 1896 building on his railroad experiments. To prove its superiority, he staged a tug of war between his steam tractor and his new gas-powered engine, demonstrating that the gas-powered engine could pull the steam tractor around the block. Best's traction engines soon received orders internationally. At this time, Daniel was selling $400,000 worth of machinery per year.

== Family and later life ==
Daniel Best married Meta Johanna Steinkamp in Marysville, Yuba County, California, on August 29, 1872. They had nine children, and moved to San Leandro in 1886, where their home stands today as a local landmark.

Best retired in 1908, aged 70. His son, Clarence Leo Best, took over the tractor company. Best died in Oakland, California on August 22, 1923, and was interred at Evergreen Cemetery.

== See also ==
- Best Manufacturing Company
