= Phoenix Manufacturing Company =

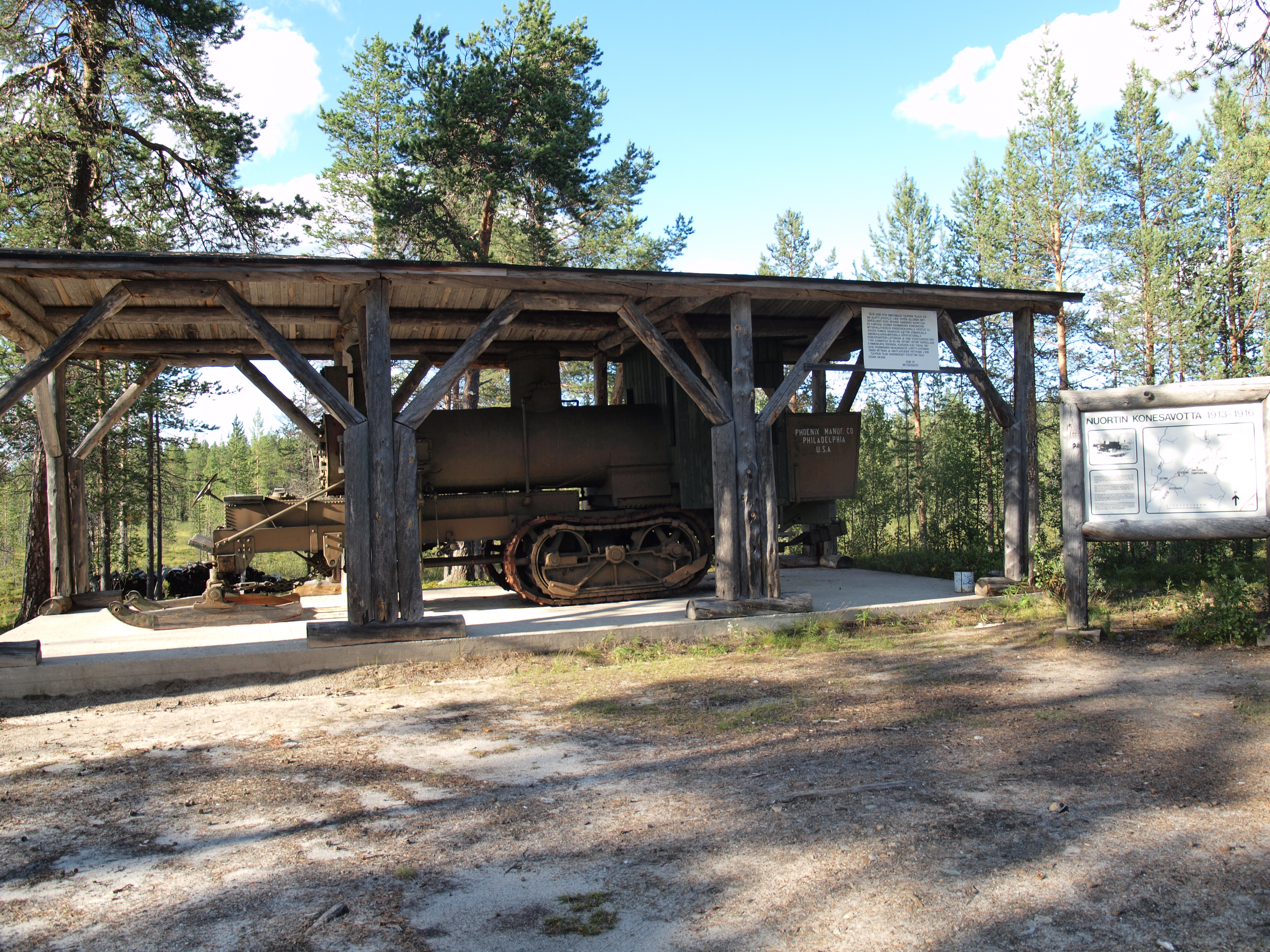
A Phoenix Manufacturing Company tracked tractor on display in Tulppio, Finland

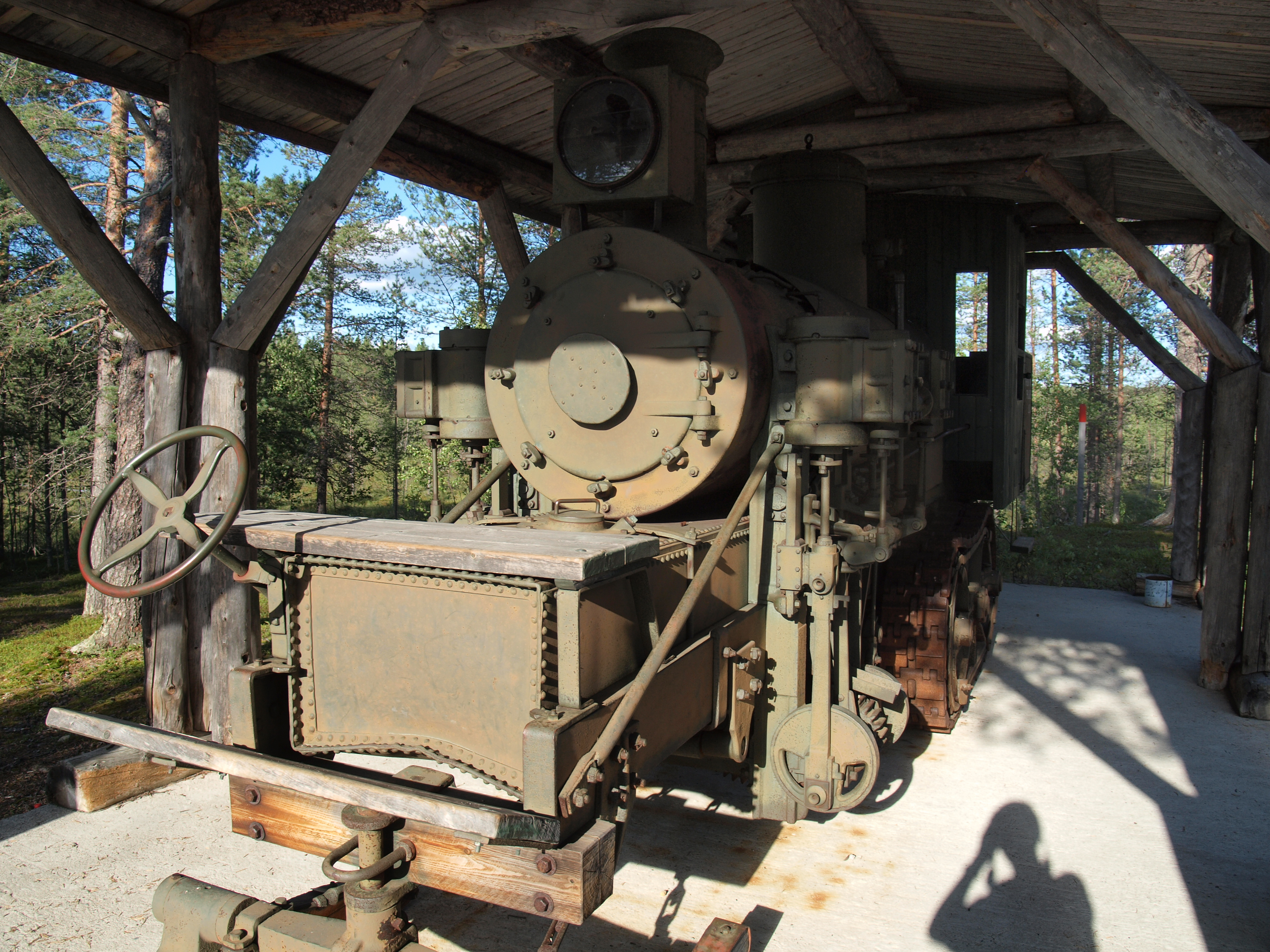
A close-up view of the tractor.

The Phoenix Manufacturing Company, later known as the Phoenix Steel Company, was one of the oldest manufacturing firms in Eau Claire, Wisconsin. The company specialized in producing equipment for the sawmill and logging industries, which played a critical role in the establishment and growth of Eau Claire.

== History ==
=== 19th century ===
The company began in 1861 when Robert Tolles and his brother-in-law, Hiram P. Graham, partnered to manufacture sashes, doors, blinds, and general woodwork. Initially, the firm was located on the north bank of the Eau Claire River, west of North Dewey Street. In 1865, additional partners joined to provide capital, transforming the firm into Graham, White & Co. The business expanded to include machinery and a foundry specializing in building and repairing sawmill equipment.

A devastating fire in 1875 destroyed the Dewey Street location. To recover and secure further investment, the business was incorporated as the Phoenix Manufacturing Company, symbolizing its rebirth after the fire. The same year, the company established a new foundry and machine shop on the west bank of the Chippewa River at Forest and Wisconsin Streets, which became its permanent home.

In 1892, the company diversified by founding the Phoenix Furniture Company, located near Half Moon Lake at 9th and Broadway.

=== 20th century ===
A major breakthrough came in 1903 when Phoenix began manufacturing a steam log hauler under patent rights from Orlando Lombard. This innovation, along with the production of logging sleighs, snow plows, and machinery for constructing logging roads, spurred significant growth. By 1907, the company expanded its facilities, adding a larger machine shop and boiler room to meet increasing demand.

However, the depletion of the timber industry in the early 20th century severely impacted the company. While Phoenix attempted to diversify into agricultural equipment, it struggled with patent disputes. Competitors often copied their unpatented designs and patented them, leading to infringement claims that further strained the business.

In 1925, the Phoenix Manufacturing Company filed for bankruptcy. Later that year, it was purchased by the W. H. Hobbs Supply Company, which repurposed the facilities to produce steel beams, reinforcing wire, sheet metal, and ornamental steel.

In 1951, Eau Claire businessman Louis L. Phillips expanded his metal scrapyard business by acquiring Phoenix and rebranding it as the Phoenix Steel Corporation. This new iteration of the company operated until its closure in 1976.

== Products ==
The Phoenix Manufacturing Company produced a number of new products for the lumber milling industry. In 1887, Phoenix introduced a new band-type mill saw, known as the Esplin mill. This was followed by the Emerson bandmill, and later the Phoenix light bandmill, known for producing the "largest cut of perfect sawed lumber for the least outlay". The firm also furnished building parts such as arches, plates, and columns. Many structures in the Eau Claire still feature slim support columns marked with the Phoenix name. The company's largest success was with the Phoenix Log Hauler, a licensed version of a Lombard Steam Log Hauler. Over a hundred of these log haulers were produced. Due to greater competition from gasoline tractors, particularly the Holt tractor, Phoenix began manufacturing the Phoenix Centipede Truck for agricultural and construction use.
