= Fyodor Blinov =

Russian inventor

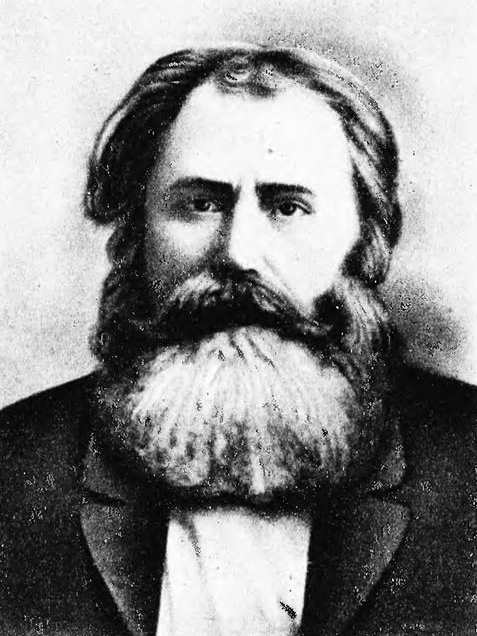
1894–97 portrait of Blinov

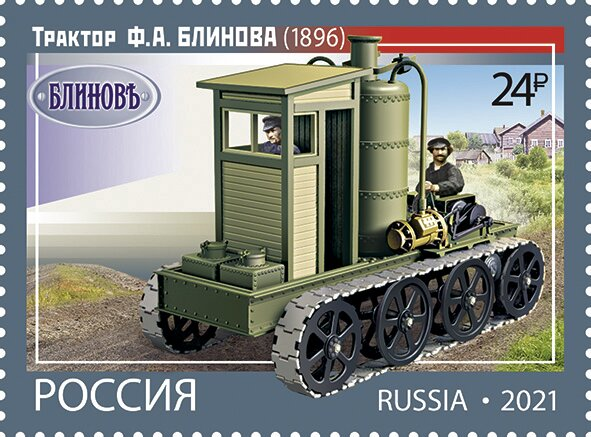
A 1896 tractor by Blinov on a 2021 stamp of Russia

Fyodor Abramovich Blinov (25 July 1827, Saratov Oblast – 24 June 1902 Saratov Oblasts, Russia) was a Russian inventor who introduced one of the first tracked vehicles (a wagon on continuous tracks) in 1877 (patented in 1879), and then developed his idea and built the first steam-powered continuous track tractor for farm usage (1881–1888). His self-propelled crawler was successfully tested and displayed at farmer's exhibition in 1896.

== Personal life ==
Fyodor was a peasant of the count Sergey Uvarov until February 19, 1861.

He married in January 1861.

== See also ==
- List of Russian inventors
