= W. H. Hobbs Supply Company =

The W. H. Hobbs Supply Company was a wholesale and retail supplier located in Eau Claire, Wisconsin. Founded by William H. Hobbs, it began operation with other partners in 1885, then operated continuously under the Hobbs name from 1907 to 1993. The company's services varied greatly over the years, but largely focused on lumber mill supplies, hardware, sporting goods, industrial and creamery supplies, electrical supplies and appliances, and plumbing, heating, water systems and air conditioning materials. The company slogan was "Busy since 1885".

The Hobbs company had a sizable cultural and economic impact on the city of Eau Claire. At its height in the 1950s, the company was a leading wholesaler in Northwest Wisconsin and occupied an entire city block of downtown. In the 1960s, the Hobbs family established the Hobbs Foundation for the purpose of making charitable grants to benefit the community of Eau Claire, leaving a lasting impact on the city.

As part of its sporting goods business, W. H. Hobbs Supply Co. exclusively distributed a line of fishing lures which are now much sought after by collectors.

== History ==
William H. Hobbs started business in Eau Claire in 1885, when he entered into a partnership in a retail and wholesale hardware, lumber and supply store at 213 S. Barstow Street. The business expanded and relocated several times in the 1880s and 1890s, with Hobbs taking on various partners throughout. Over this time period, the company expanded their business into plumbing, heating and sheet metal work, becoming the first plumbing and heating contractor in the city. In March 1901 Hobbs purchased the Eau Claire Mill Supply Co. at the corner of Eau Claire Street and Farwell Street, the site which would later become its main headquarters.

The business was incorporated as the W. H. Hobbs Supply Co. in January 1907. William's son Roswell joined the company in 1907 as vice president, and William's daughter Jessie later joined the company as well.

With the rising popularity of automobiles, in 1907 the company opened the first auto garage and dealership in Eau Claire. Hobbs distributed Ford, Maxwell and REO automobiles, later adding Lozier, Locomobile, Thomas Flyer, Premier, Overland, Hudson and Chalmers cars. Their distributorship territory covered approximately 20 counties. Hobbs discontinued selling autos in 1913, with the company again expanding and re-focusing on wholesale hardware supply and contracting.

In 1919, Hobbs built their main five-story building at 402–420 Eau Claire St., with 32,000 square feet of floor space. In 1925 the company purchased the bankrupt Phoenix Manufacturing Co., and operated it as a division of the Hobbs company until 1951, when it was sold and incorporated as the Phoenix Steel Corp.

When William died in 1936, his son Roswell Hobbs assumed the position of president and daughter Jessie became vice president.

The company again concentrated its efforts in the wholesale supply market. Further acquisitions in the 1940s and 1950s gave it a full city block in the business center of the city, comprising at least 27 buildings and 7.5 acres.

Roswell Hobbs died in 1966, and Jessie Hobbs became president. In 1968, Jessie sold the controlling interest in the family business to Vernon C. Grudem, who was the company's plumbing and heating manager. After several ownership changes and management transitions, W. H. Hobbs Supply Co. ceased operations in 1993.
