= Tulppio =

Village in Lapland, Finland

Coordinates: 67°46′N 029°13′E

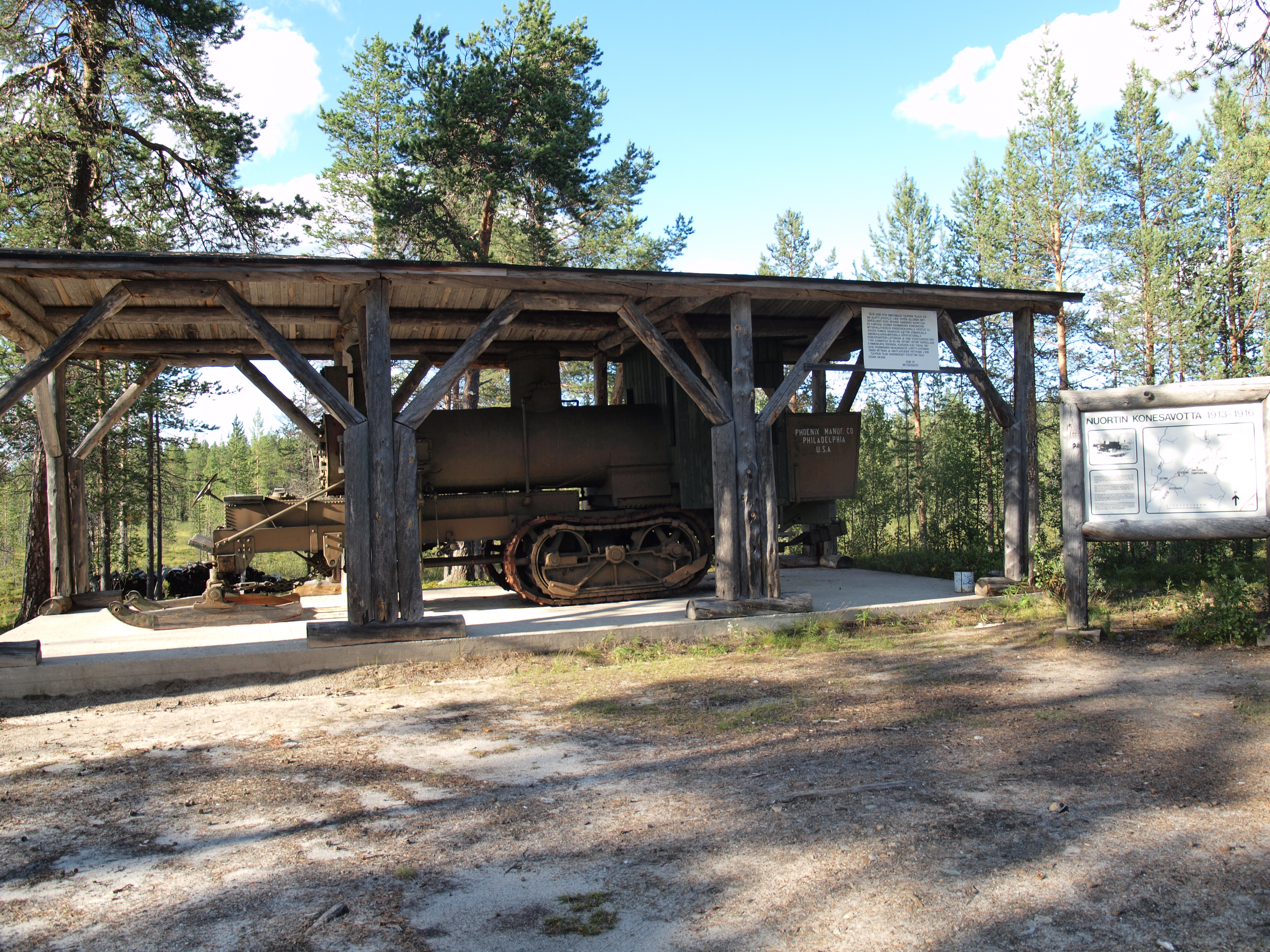
A Lombard Steam Log Hauler made by the Phoenix Manufacturing Company, on display in Tulppio

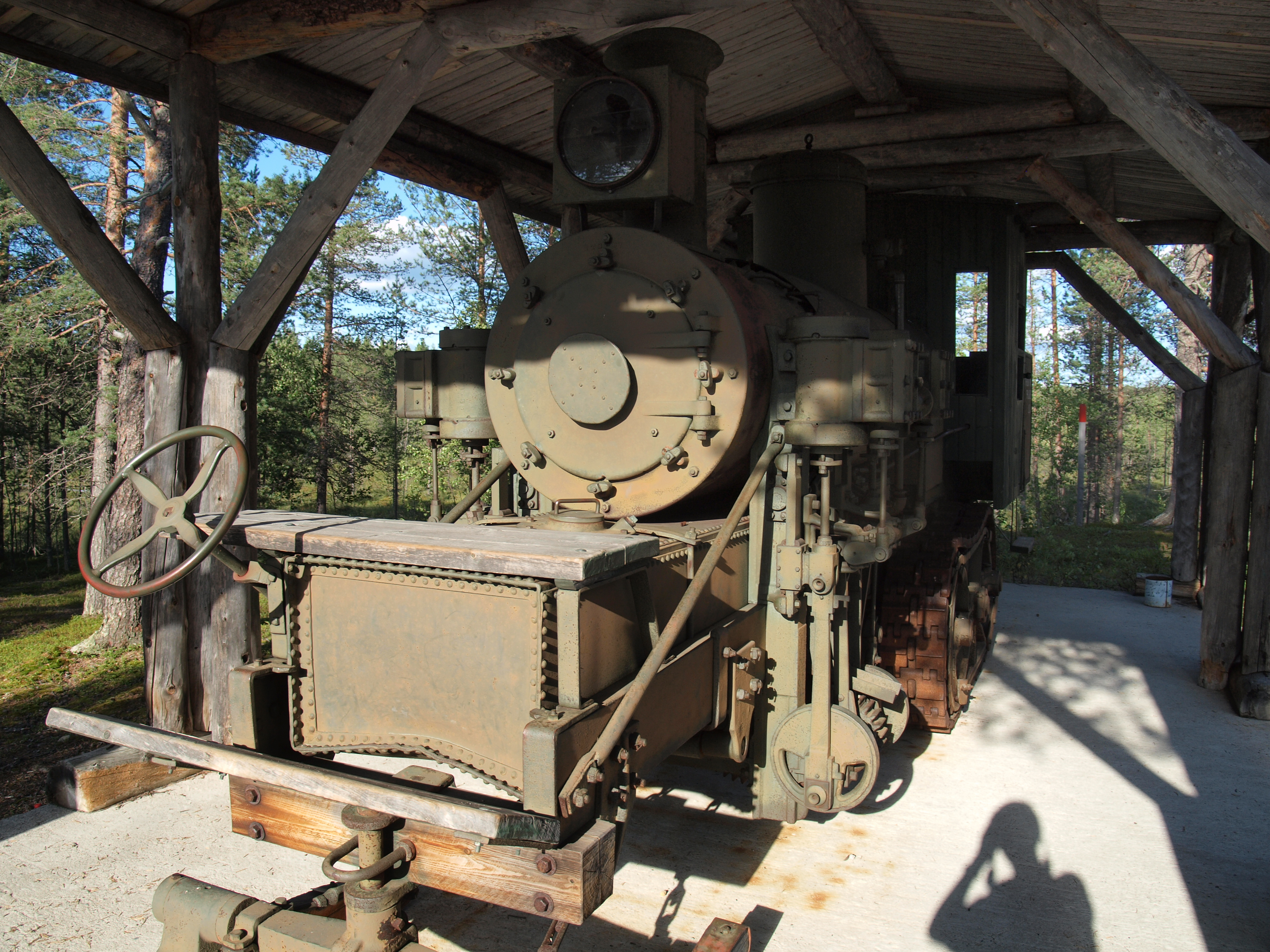
A close-up view of the log hauler

Tulppio is a locality (Note: "village or neighborhood", kylä tai kulmakunta) in the municipality of Savukoski, Lapland, Finland. It is located about 70 kilometres (43 mi) north-east of the main village of Savukoski, 10 km (6.2 mi) south of the Urho Kekkonen national park and 19 km (12 mi) west of the Russian border. There is no permanent residence in Tulppio, but a very popular camping resort for people on fishing trips is located there.
