= Lombard Steam Log Hauler =

Early tracked vehicle

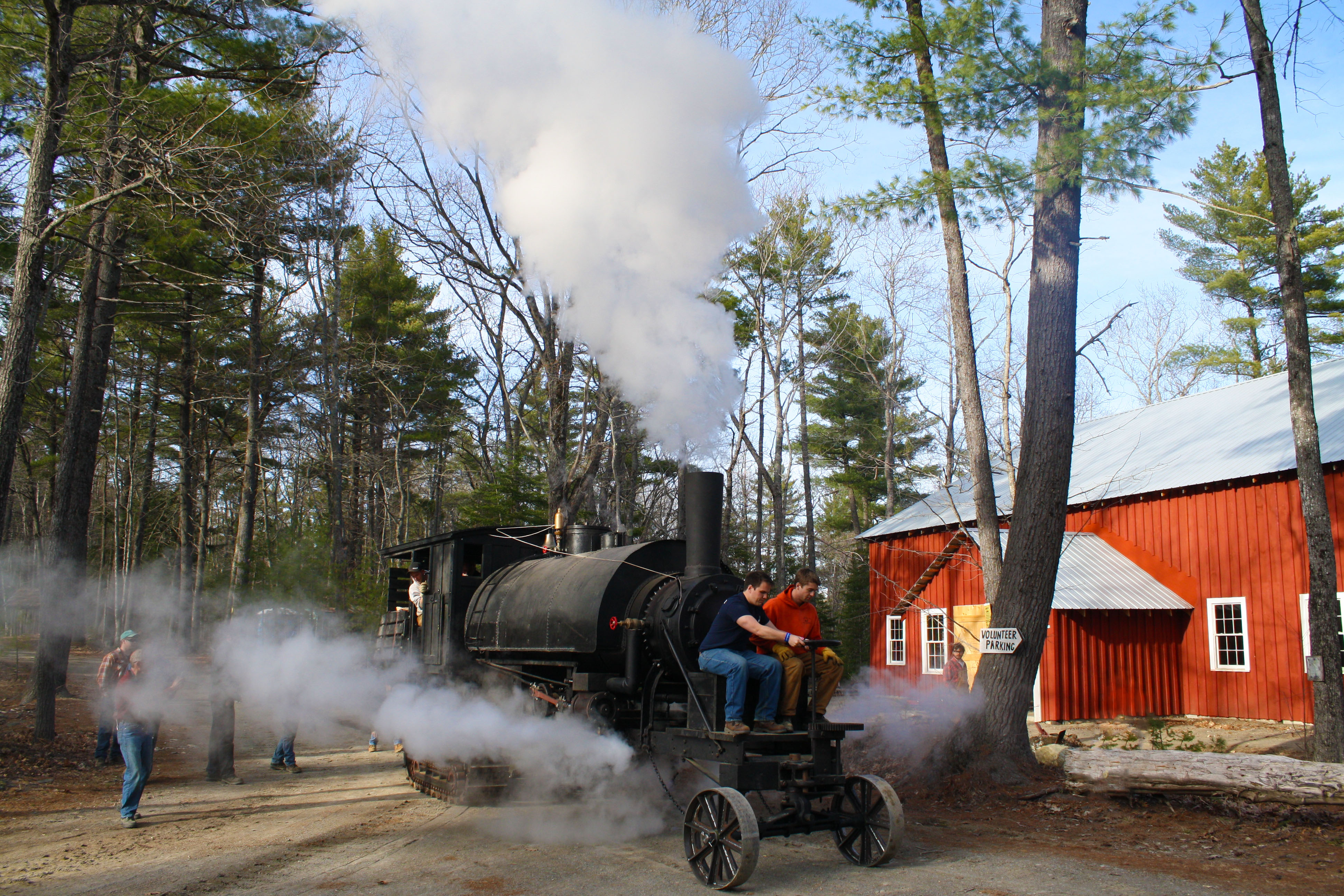
Lombard Log Hauler #38, built ca. 1910, restored in 2014 by the University of Maine Mechanical Engineering Technology class of 2014 and the Maine Forest and Logging Museum.

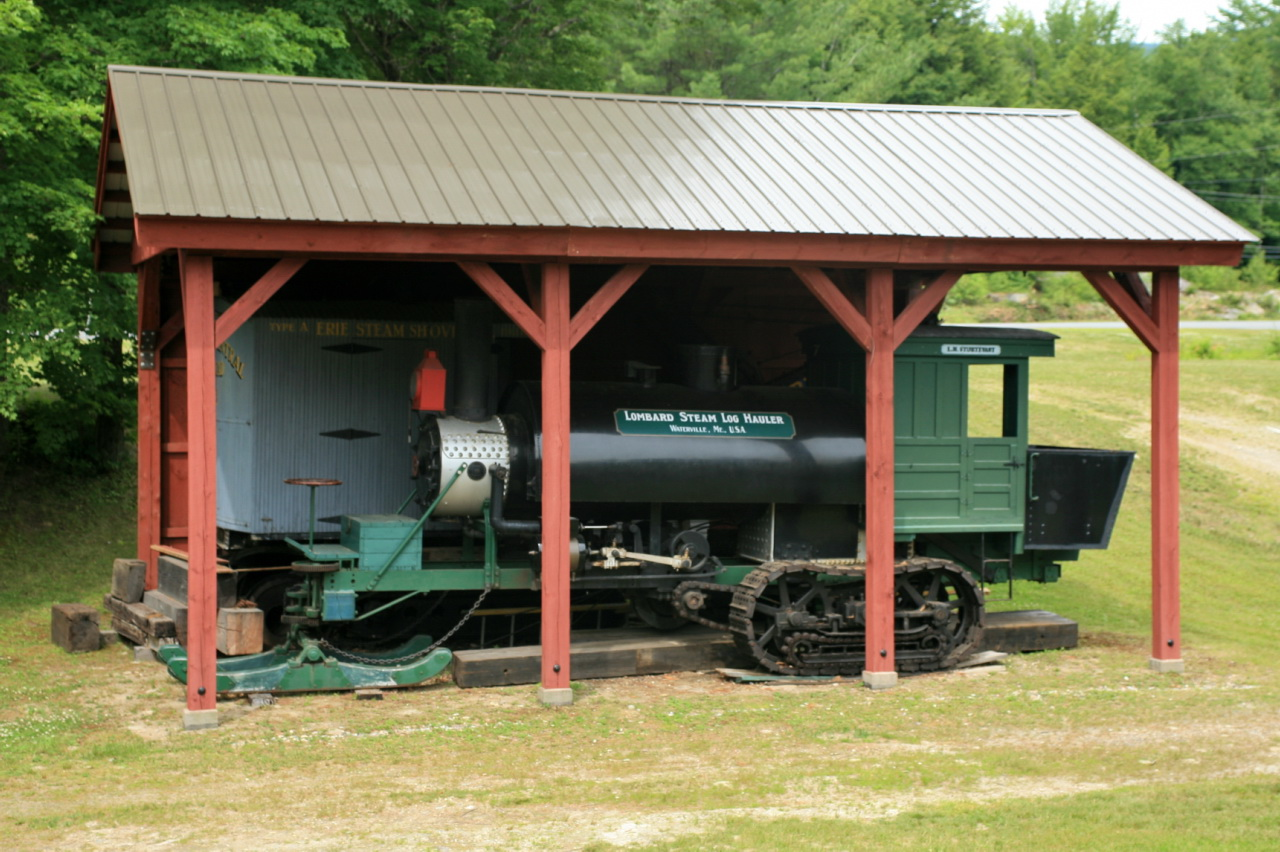
A restored Lombard steam log hauler at Clark's Trading Post in Lincoln, New Hampshire

The Lombard Steam Log Hauler was the first successful commercial application of a continuous track for vehicle propulsion. Patented 21 May 1901, the concept was later used for military tanks during World War I and for agricultural tractors and construction equipment following the war.

== Description ==
Alvin Orlando Lombard was a blacksmith building logging equipment in Waterville, Maine. He built 83 steam log haulers between 1901 and 1917. Resembling a saddle-tank steam locomotive, these log haulers were fitted with skis steered from a small platform placed in front of the boiler and propelled by a set of chain-driven continuous tracks. Similar in steering and drive configuration to snowmobiles, the 10- to 30-ton vehicles could reach a top speed of about 4.5 miles per hour (7.2 km/h).

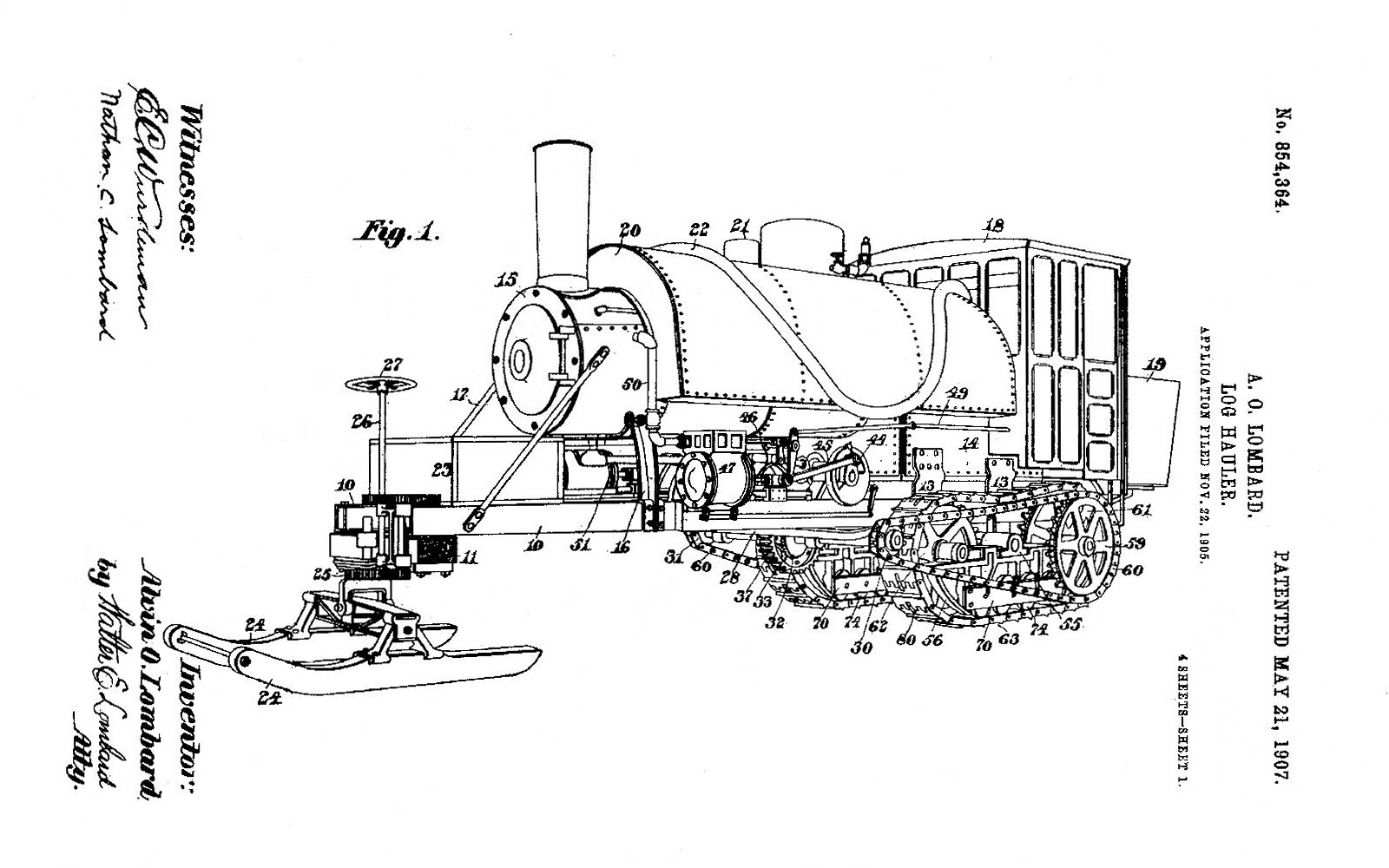
Lombard Patent US854364

== Operation ==
Each train required a crew of four: a steersman in front, an engineer and fireman in the cab, and a conductor riding on the log sleds, who signaled the crew in the cab with a bell-rope or wire. The earliest log haulers pulled three sleds, in time increased to eight. Each train carried 40,000 to 100,000 board-feet of logs. The record train length was said to be 24 sleds with a total length of 1,650 feet (500 m).

Downhill grades were the most dangerous, where ice allowed the sleds to accelerate faster than the engine. Jack-knifing sleds pushed many log haulers into trees, and most photos of log haulers show rebuilt cabs and bent ironwork on the boiler and saddle tank. Hay was spread over the downhill routes in an effort to increase friction under the sleds, but hungry deer sometimes consumed it before the train arrived.

The exposed steersman was subjected to sub-freezing temperatures that could reach 40 degrees below zero. Sparks flying out of the boiler stack above him would sometimes set his clothing on fire; some steersmen earned enough money to purchase fire-resistant leather gear. Some log haulers had a small roofed shelter built on the steering platform, but the shelter limited the steersman's ability to jump clear in collisions, who then had to dodge the logs sleds.

Berlin Mills Company was one of the larger woods operators to use Lombard log haulers. It purchased one machine in 1904, followed by two more to rotate during needed maintenance and repairs. Nightly application of water from a sprinkler sled kept its single 6-mile-long (10 km) iced haul road in Stetson, Maine, open. A telephone line with frequent call boxes handled sled dispatch and communications. The company estimated its log haulers did the work of 60 horses.

== History ==
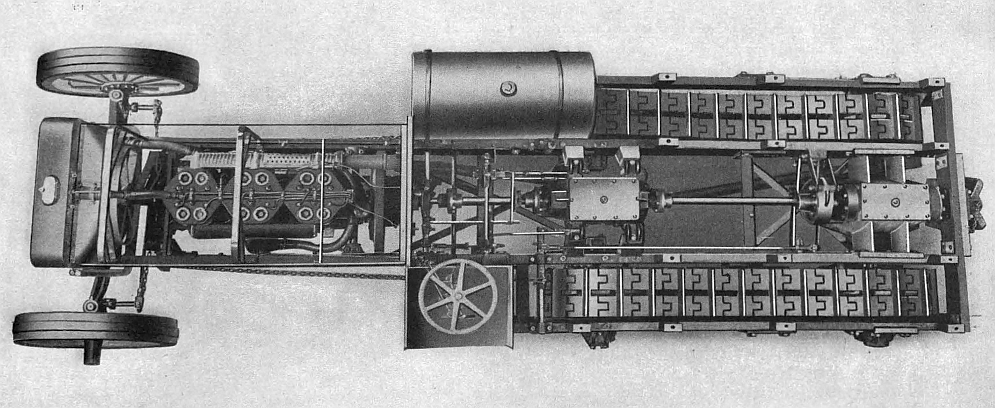
Lombard 100 HP Auto Tractor Truck Chassis and traction (1916)

The first two Lombard log haulers were used near Eustis, Maine, in 1901 prior to construction of the Eustis Railroad. These early machines had an upright boiler and were steered by a team of horses. Most of the Lombard log haulers were used in Maine and New Hampshire. A few were used in Michigan, Wisconsin and Russia. Lombard began building 6-cylinder gasoline-powered log haulers in 1914, produced a more powerful "Big 6" later, and built one Fairbanks-Morse Diesel engine hauler in 1934. The internal combustion log haulers (called Lombard tractors) were less powerful than the steam log haulers; and resembled a stake body truck on a skis and tracks chassis. The steam-powered haulers are thought to have been used as late as 1929. At least ten of the Lombard tractors were preserved at Churchill Depot as recently as the 1960s.

== Legacy ==
Antarctic Mount Lombard was named in recognition of the Lombard Log Hauler as the first application of knowledge of snow mechanics to trafficability. The Lombard Steam Log Hauler was designated a National Historic Mechanical Engineering Landmark in 1982 following nomination by the American Society of Mechanical Engineers.

Lombard Steam Log Haulers have been preserved and restored in:

- Ashland Logging Museum in Ashland, Maine
- Maine Forest & Logging Museum in Bradley, Maine
- Owls Head Transportation Museum in Owls Head, Maine
- Lumberman's Museum in Patten, Maine
- Clark's Trading Post in Lincoln, New Hampshire
- Rhinelander, Wisconsin
- Saskatchewan Western Development Museum in Saskatoon
- Waterville, Maine
- Tulppio, Finland
- Rovaniemi Forestry Museum, Finland
- Maine State Museum in Augusta, Maine
