= Alvin Orlando Lombard =

American inventor

Alvin O. Lombard
- Born: 1856; Springfield, Maine
- Died: 1937
- Known for: Engineer, inventor

Alvin Orlando Lombard (1856-1937) was the American inventor of the track-wheeled vehicle. First patented in 1901, the Lombard Steam Log Hauler revolutionized the movement of harvested logs through the woods and set the stage for every snowmobile, tank and bulldozer ever built.

== Youth ==
Alvin Lombard was born in Springfield, Maine in 1856. He demonstrated mechanical aptitude as a boy building small machines including a model wood-splitter powered by a water wheel. He demonstrated the model by cutting cucumber slices.

== Career ==
At the age of 8, Alvin began working in the family sawmill in Lincoln, Maine. He later obtained patents for some of his mechanical innovations at the sawmill, and opened a blacksmith shop in Waterville, Maine with his brother, Samuel Lombard. Samuel oversaw manufacturing of sawmill and logging equipment Alvin had designed.

In their shop in Waterville, the Lombard brothers produced the huge steam-powered locomotives that slid on skis and were powered by huge tracks in the rear, enabling them to travel throughout the Maine woods free from the steel tracks that limited other railroad vehicles. In time, Lombard produced smaller, diesel powered loghaulers as well as trucks, snowplows and other commercial vehicles.

Lombard also obtained patents for a pulpwood debarker, a device for automatically cutting pulpwood into shorter lengths for grinding, a pulpwood crusher, a device for removing knots from sulfite process pulp, and a governor to control the speed of water turbines.

== Legacy ==
Antarctic Mount Lombard was named in recognition of the Lombard Log Hauler as the first application of knowledge of snow mechanics to trafficability. His Waterville home is listed on the National Register of Historic Places.
