= Military vehicle =

Vehicle which is specially designed for use by military forces

Military light utility vehicles operated by the United States Marine Corps in South Korea

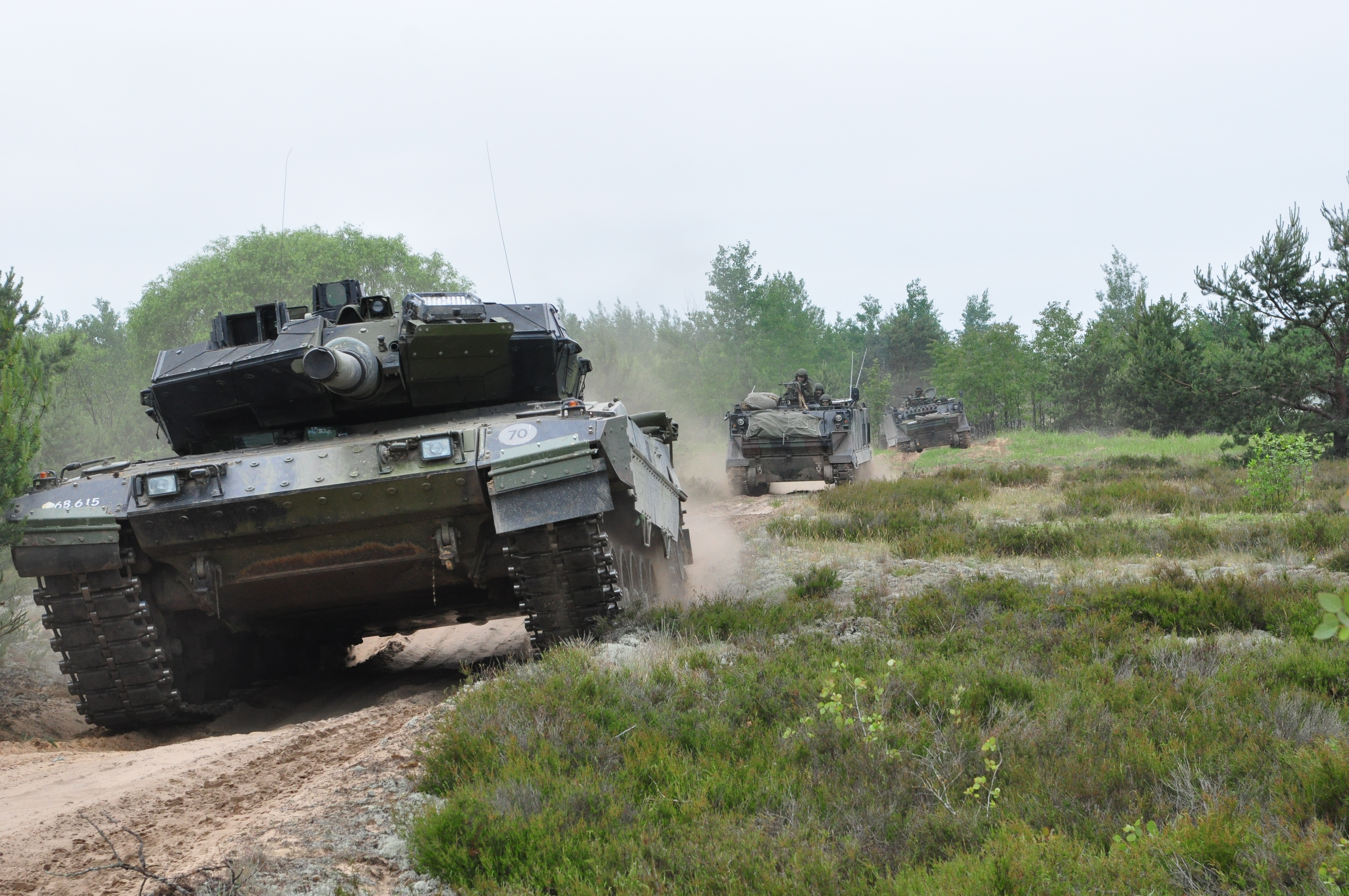
Danish Defence and Lithuanian Armed Forces tanks and armoured personnel carriers conducting battle drills

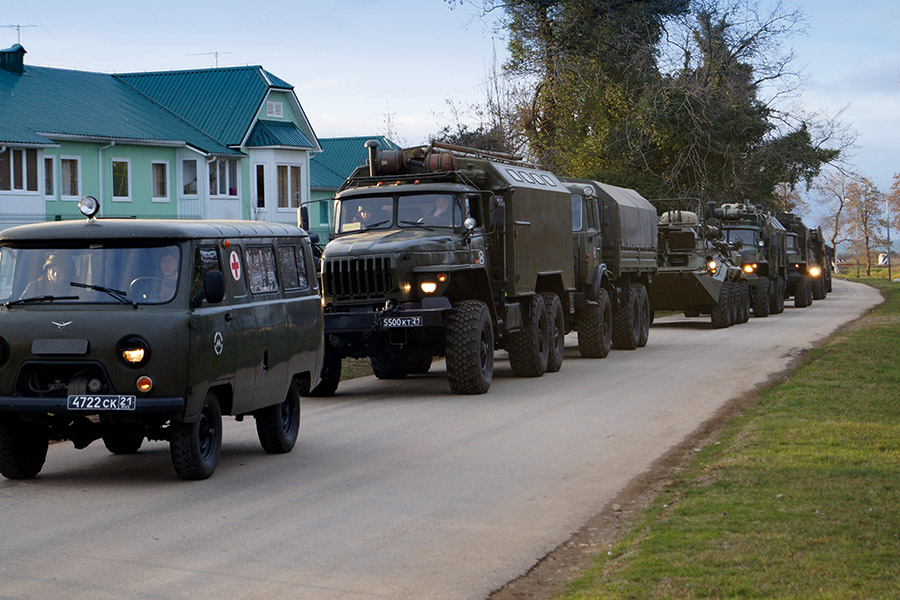
A convoy of Russian Armed Forces trucks, including a military ambulance and an amphibious vehicle

A military vehicle is any vehicle for land-based military transport and activity, including combat vehicles, both specifically designed for or significantly used by military. Most military vehicles require off-road capabilities and/or vehicle armor, making them heavy. Some have vehicle tracks instead of just wheels; half-tracks have both. Furthermore, some military vehicles are amphibious, constructed for use on land and water, and sometimes also intermediate surfaces.

Military vehicles are almost always camouflaged, or at least painted in inconspicuous color(s). In contrast, under the Geneva Conventions, all non-combatant military vehicles, such as military ambulances and mobile first aid stations, must be properly and clearly marked as such. Under the conventions, when respected, such vehicles are legally immune from deliberate attack by all combatants.

Historically, militaries explored the use of commercial off-the-shelf (COTS) vehicles, both to gain experience with commercially available products and technology, and to try to save time in development, and money in procurement. A subtype that has become increasingly prominent since the late 20th century is the improvised fighting vehicle, often seen in irregular warfare.

== Military trucks ==
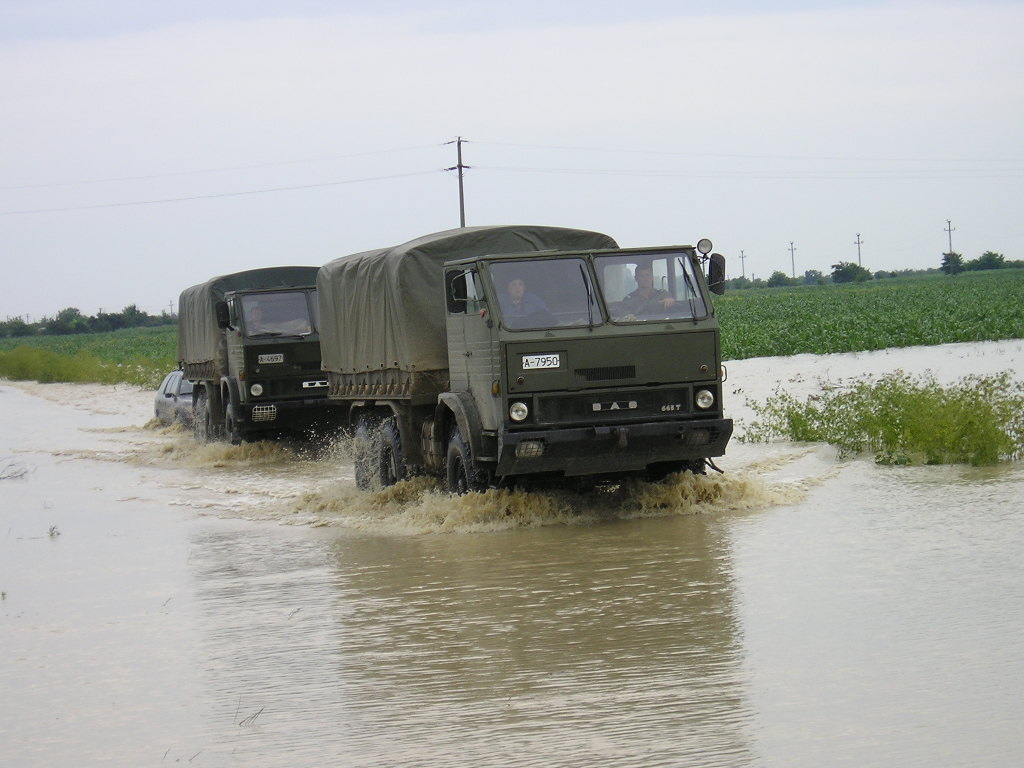
DAC military trucks operated by the Romanian Armed Forces

A military truck is a vehicle designed to transport troops, fuel, and materiel along asphalted roads and unpaved dirt roads. Military trucks are a crucial part of military logistics. Several countries have manufactured their own models of military trucks, each of which has its own technical characteristics. These vehicles are adapted to the needs of the different armies on the ground. In general, these trucks are composed of a chassis, a motor, a transmission, a cabin, an area for the placement of the load and the equipment, axles of transmission, suspensions, direction, tires, electrical, pneumatic, hydraulic, engine cooling systems, and brakes. They can be operated with a gasoline engine or with a diesel engine, there are four-wheel drive (4x4) vehicles, six wheeled (6x6), eight wheeled (8x8), ten wheeled (10x10) and even twelve wheeled vehicles (12x12).

== Types of military vehicles ==
Land combat and non-combat vehicles include:

- Combat vehicle:
  - Amphibious military vehicle (category)
  - Armored fighting vehicle
    - Armored car
    - Armored personnel carrier
    - Infantry fighting vehicle
    - Infantry mobility vehicle
    - Internal security vehicle
  - Improvised fighting vehicle
    - Technical
    - Gun truck
  - Military railways
    - Armoured train
    - Military draisine
  - MRAP
  - Reconnaissance vehicle
  - Self-propelled anti-aircraft weapon
  - Self-propelled artillery
  - Tank
  - Tracked military vehicle
    - Half-track
  - Wheeled military vehicle (category)
- Non-combat vehicles:
  - Ambulance and Ambulance (category)
  - Amphibious vehicle
  - Bomb disposal vehicle
  - Float
  - Fire engine
  - Military bicycle
  - Military engineering vehicle
  - Military light utility vehicle
  - Military motorcycle (category)
  - Military police vehicle
  - Military trailer (category)
  - Military truck (category)
  - Off-road military vehicle
  - Recovery vehicle

== See also ==
- Military transport not primarily used on land:
  - Military aircraft
  - Military spacecraft
  - Naval ships
    - Warships
- Camouflage
- List of military vehicles
