= Swiss army bicycle =

Swiss military vehicle

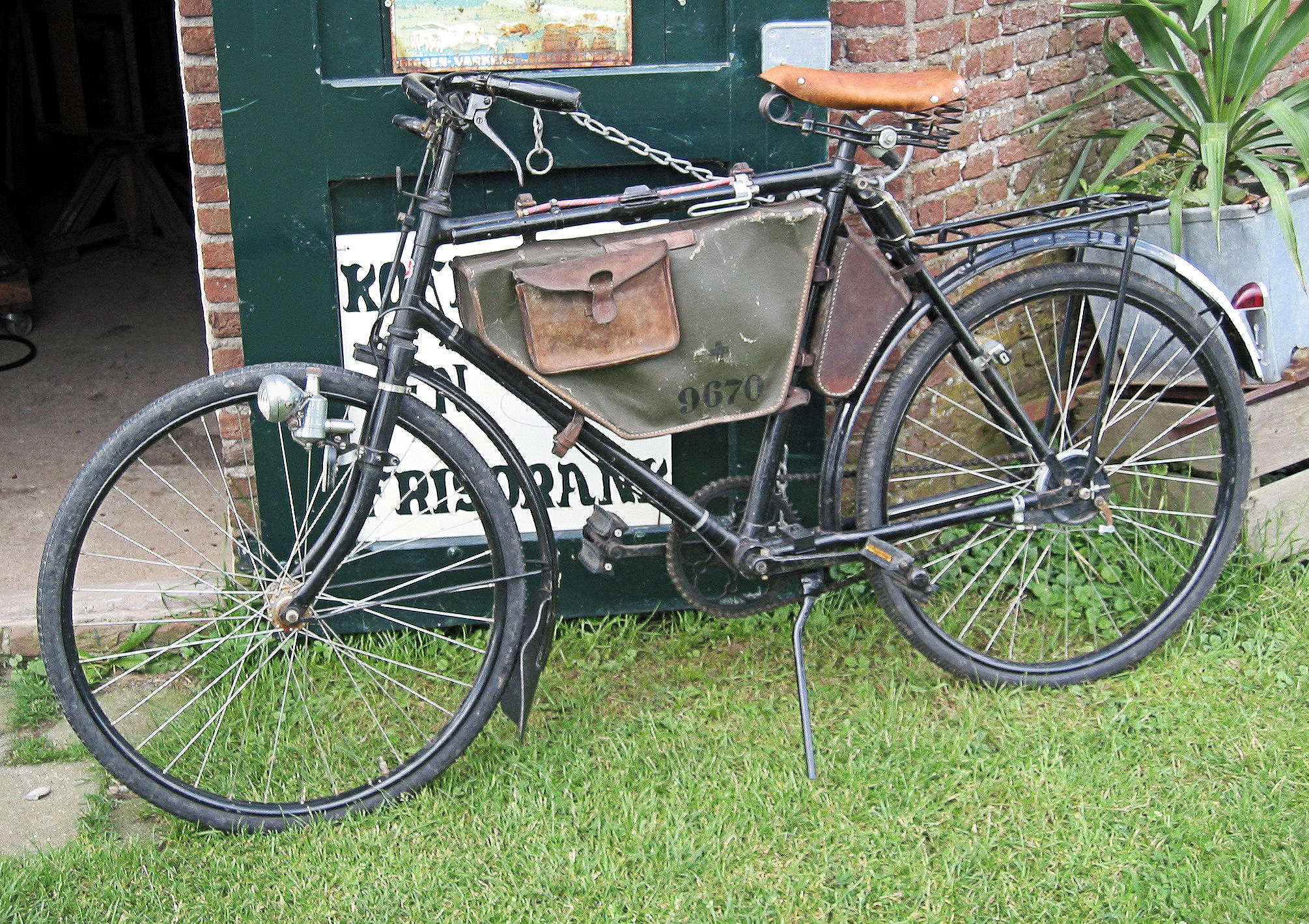
The MO-05 Swiss Army bicycle.

The Swiss Army Bicycle (German: Armeefahrrad, Militärvelo; French: vélo militaire; Italian: bicicletta militare) has been utilized by the Swiss Army beginning in 1905. There have been three models, the MO-5 (built 1905–1989), MO-93 (built 1993–95), and the MO-12 (from 2012). The Swiss Army disbanded its elite bicycle infantry units in 2003, but still uses bicycles for training, and many army bicycles remain in private use. The most famous Swiss bicycle infantryman is Federal Councillor Ueli Maurer, who commanded a bicycle infantry battalion until 1994 and still uses his army bicycle. In 2012, the Department of Defence, Civil Defence, and Sport purchased 4100 of the new, lighter MO-12 or Fahrrad 12, which are also available for private purchase.

== The MO-05 ==
The classic Swiss Army Bicycle, as used by the Swiss bicycle infantry. Officially called Ordonnanzfahrrad Modell 05, it was introduced in 1905 and in continuous use until replaced by the MO-93. It was built between 1905 and 1989 by Schwalbe, Cäsar, Cosmos, Mondia and Condor. Swiss bicycle Infantry were phased out in 2001. The most recognisable feature of most Swiss Army Bicycles is the large carry case fitted into the frame. It is accessed from the right-hand side, whilst having a separate document and map compartment on the left-hand side. They were painted all-over basic black, usually semi-matt, although some later models were painted olive drab. Fittings and accessories were variously black, brown or olive drab in colour. The basic model saw many variations as it was adapted for use in many different fields of warfare. Some were stripped down of all non-essential fittings for use as a messenger transport. Fitted with a 57 cm one-size-fits-all frame for men between 1.55m and 1.95m tall, they had 650B (26" x 1-1/2") wheels. They were typically fitted with a 20-tooth rear sprocket, and a 50-tooth chainring giving an overall gearing of 65 gear inches (5.18 metres development per stroke). Two-wheel trailers were used for carrying cargo or a stretcher.

=== Fittings ===
They were also fitted with an integrated headlight and bottle dynamo which operated on the front tyre side-wall. Other fittings included mudguards and a rear carry rack. A bag was often fitted on the front was intended for carrying a battle-helmet, but this was often used to carry many other items. Quite often a rolled blanket was strapped to the handle-bars on top of this. A bread-bag for carrying the rider's food rations was usually attached to one side of the rear rack. This bag could be removed and worn as a haversack over one shoulder using a separate shoulder strap. This bag had two straps to hold it to the rear rack and one strap near the bottom to secure it to the bicycle's frame. Anecdotal evidence suggests that soldiers used the bottom attachment to go around their belts to hold the bag on their back. Behind the seat-tube there was a small tool hold-all which carried enough tools to perform basic maintenance and if necessary a "field-strip" of the bicycle. Their heavily-sprung leather saddles help to iron out the roughness of any roads they had to travel. Depending on how the bicycle was set up a large bicycle pump was carried either on top of the carry case or attached in front of the seat-tube. This combination of fittings made the basic MO-05 a versatile piece of military hardware.

=== Braking System ===
The MO-05 was introduced as a single-speed bicycle with a rear coaster brake and a rod-operated front spoon brake. From 1941 they were also fitted with a cable-operated rear drum brake. Some models (believed to be intended for use by medics) had a front drum brake fitted in place of the usual spoon brake. The basic MO-05 weighed a hefty 52 lbs (23.6 kg) when empty. Post-1946 models were built slightly lighter at 48 lbs (21.8 kg). Riders had to be quite fit, as some soldiers were expected to carry up to 70 lbs (31.8 kg) of equipment with only a single gear.

This bike can still be seen regularly in Switzerland. Many of these MO-05s were sold to private individuals after the army had replaced it with the MO-93. Some of the MO-05 are still in military use, such as on airfields by pilots and ground crews.

== The MO-93 ==
The MO-93, officially called Militärrad 93, was the first major re-development of the Swiss Army Bicycle, built by Villiger and Condor between 1993 and 1995. The basic frame layout was retained for compatibility with existing equipment, and outwardly appears roughly similar to the MO-05 except for its green color (technically: RAL 6014 F9 Gelboliv - olive-yellow). It was equipped with a 7-speed derailer gearing system, which is protected by a hefty guard at the rear axle. The MO-93 also differed by having a front carry rack fitted as standard equipment in addition to the rear carry rack. The front rack also served as a mounting for the new headlight assembly which was operated by an axle-mounted dynamo on the front wheel. It was also fitted with modern mountain-bicycle style handle-bars. Many other modern features were incorporated such as rim-brakes. The characteristic frame carry box was retained. Condor produced 5,500 units for the Swiss Army at a price of CHF 2,200. This bicycle is rather heavy, yet sturdy, at an average 25 kg. A few are still used at the Parachute Reconnaissance Company 17 (Fallschirmaufklärer Kompanie 17) Special Forces base and Paratrooper school at Locarno-Magadino military airport in Southern Switzerland. According to the Swiss Army website, bicycles are currently used by cadet officers, sergeant majors, quartermasters, cooks, guards, in addition to physical training and movement between barracks and firing range.

Specifications:

Gears: 7-speed Shimano XT at rear wheel
Brakes: Magura hydraulic rim brakes, ceramic coated rims
Dynamo: Dynamo spoke FER 2000
Accessories: frame bag, saddle bag, metal frame panniers for mortar rounds/ammo, carriers for 60mm mortar, Panzerfaust, machine gun. Trailers for cargo or stretcher
Weight: 21.5 kg (minimum)

== The MO-12 ==
In 2012, the Department of Defence, Civil Defence, and Sport purchased 4100 units of a new model of military bicycle, officially called Fahrrad 12, at a cost of CHF 10.2 million (approximately CHF 2,490 per unit, including maintenance costs over 10 years) from Simpel.ch, as the original manufacturer of the Model 93 was not available. The new model features commercial components. The bicycle is also available to private customers at a price of CHF 2,495.

Specifications:

- Frame: AN6 aluminium, painted black
- Gears: 8-speed Shimano Alfine
- Tyres: Schwalbe Marathon Plus 26x1.75
- Brakes: disc brakes front and rear, Magura MT4
- Dynamo: Shimano Alfine DH-S501 hub dynamo
- Accessories: Tool Bag
- Weight: 15 kg

== See also ==
- Outline of cycling
- Military bicycle
- Roadster (bicycle)
- Swedish military bicycle
