= Alvin O. Lombard House =

Historic house in Maine, United States

- U.S. National Register of Historic Places
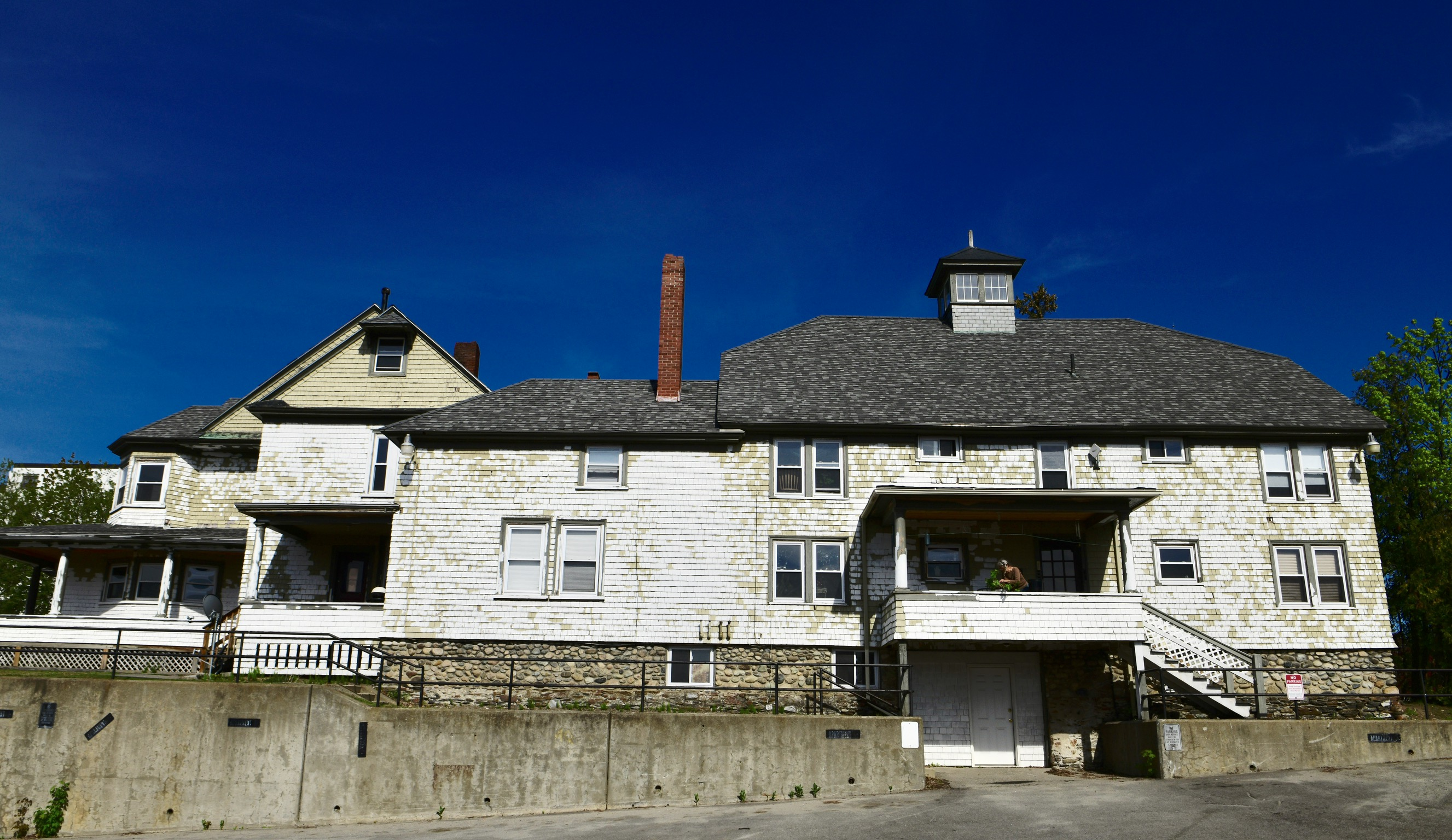

- Location within Maine Location within the United States
- Location: 65 Elm St. Waterville, Maine
- Coordinates: 44°33′2.8″N 69°37′56.3″W
- Area: 0.3 acres (0.12 ha)
- Built: 1908
- Architectural style: Shingle Style
- NRHP reference No.: 82000753
- Added to NRHP: February 19, 1982

The Alvin O. Lombard House is a historic house at 65 Elm Street in Waterville, Maine. Built in 1908, it is a distinctive local example of late Shingle style architecture. It is further notable as the home of inventor Alvin O. Lombard, who developed the Lombard Steam Log Hauler, an early commercial use of track-propelled vehicles. The house was listed on the National Register of Historic Places in 1982.

== Description and history ==
The Alvin O. Lombard House is in downtown Waterville, on the east side of Elm Street just south of the public library, in an increasingly commercial area. It is a rambling 2 1/2-story wood-frame structure, with a gambrel roof, shingled exterior, and stone foundation. Its front facade, facing west, is dominated by a projecting gabled section, which features a recessed porch flanked by polygonal windows bays, and a three-window recess in the upper part of the gable. A single-story porch extends across the front, and sweeps around to the side without a covering roof. A two-story carriage house of similar styling is attached to the northeastern corner; it has a square cupola at the top of its gambrel roof. The interior retains significant original decorative elements, despite its 1940s alteration into a multiunit residence.

The house was built in 1908; its architect is not known. It was built for Alvin O. Lombard, a Waterville native, who lived there for the last third of his life. Lombard is credited with developing an early version of caterpillar tracks, a vehicular propulsion mechanism that eventually saw broad application in a variety of application, most notably in military vehicles and earthmoving equipment. The Lombard Steam Log Hauler was Lombard's effort to capitalize on this invention. He also patented a turbine water wheel control mechanism.

== See also ==
- National Register of Historic Places listings in Kennebec County, Maine
