= Bicycle infantry =

Military personnel who use bicycles

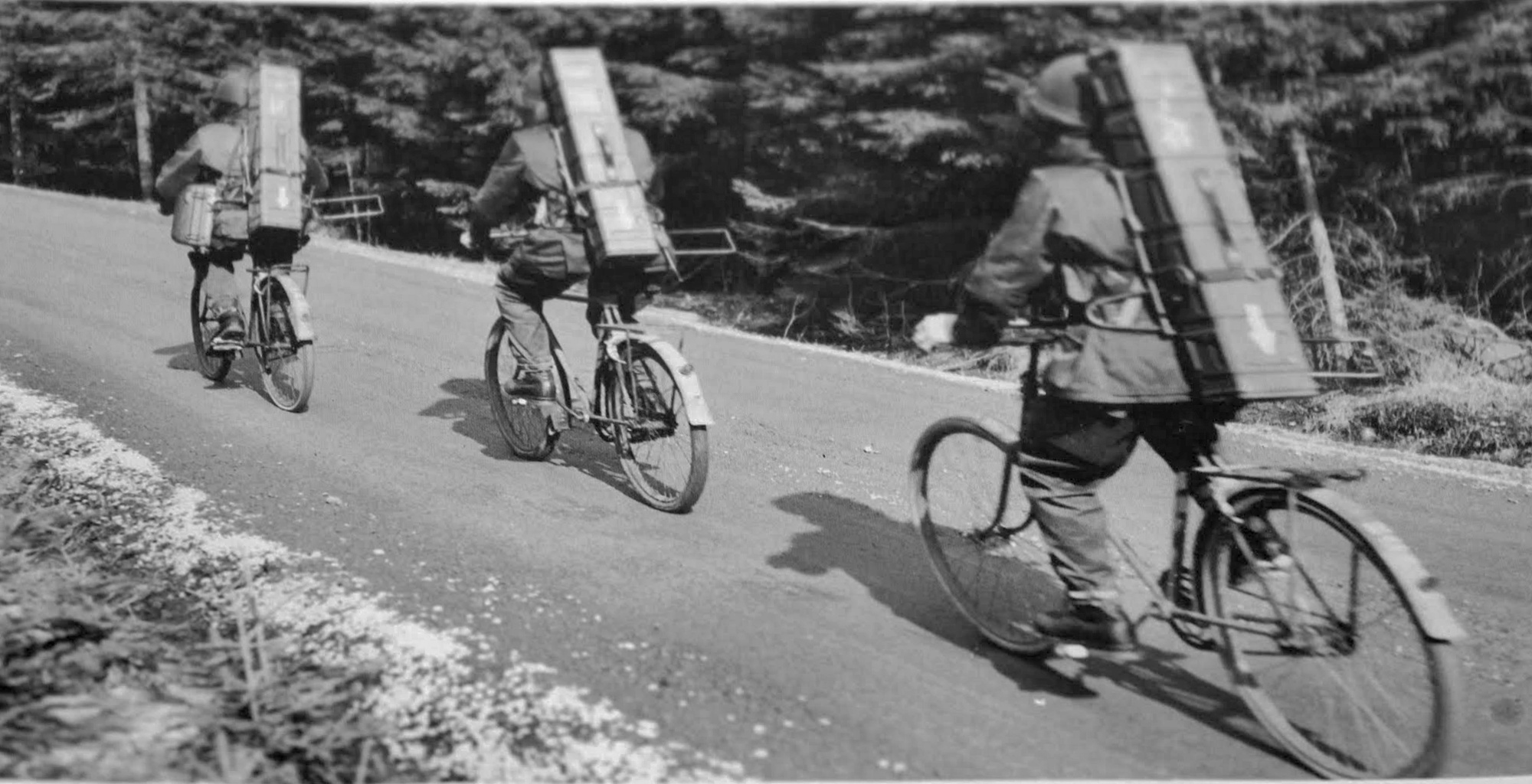
Swedish Army bicycle infantry soldiers with Carl Gustaf m/45 submachine guns and Bantam anti-tank missiles, 1965

Bicycle infantry are infantry soldiers who maneuver on (or, more often, between) battlefields using military bicycles. The term dates from the late 19th century, when the "safety bicycle" became popular in Europe, the United States, and Australia. Historically, bicycles lessened the need for horses, fuel and vehicle maintenance. Though their use has waned over the years in many armies, they continue to be used in unconventional armies such as militias.

== History ==
=== Origins ===
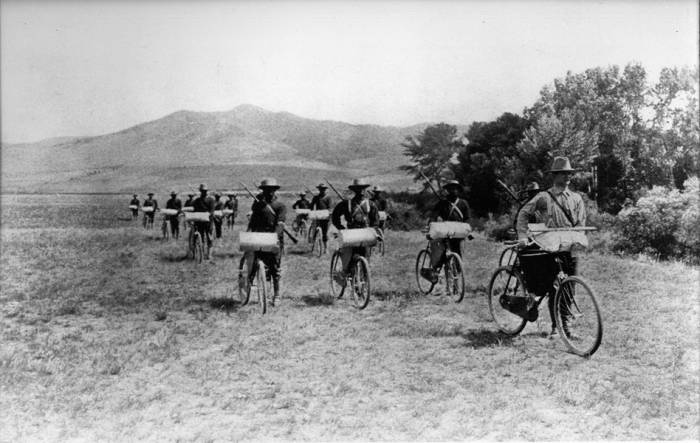
American Bicycle Corps at Fort Missoula in 1897

The development of pneumatic tires coupled with shorter, sturdier frames during the late 19th century led to the investigation of possible military uses for bicycles. To some extent, bicyclists took over the functions of dragoons, especially as messengers and scouts, substituting for horses in warfare. Bicycle units or detachments were in existence by the end of the 19th century in most armies. The United Kingdom employed bicycle troops in militia or territorial units, rather than in regular army units. Essentially this reflected the popularity of cycling amongst the civilian population and the perceived value of bicycles in providing increased mobility for home defence units.

In 1887 the first of a series of cyclist maneuvers involving British volunteer units was held. In France, several experimental units were created, starting in 1886. They developed folding bicycles, that could be collapsed and carried slung across the backs of their riders, from an early date. By 1900 each French line infantry and chasseur battalion had a cyclist detachment, intended for skirmishing, scouting and dispatch carrying. In the years prior to World War I the availability of an extensive network of paved or gravel roads in western Europe made military cyclists appear a feasible alternative to horse-mounted troops; on the grounds of economy, simplicity of training, relative silence when on the move and ease of logistical support. The Dutch and Belgian armies, with extensive flat terrain within their national boundaries, maintained battalion or company sized units of cyclists. The Italian Bersaglieri expanded their established role as fast-moving light infantry through the extensive use of bicycles from the 1890s onwards. Even the Swiss Army found bicycles to be a useful means of mobility in rough terrain where horse cavalry could not be used. The Imperial Russian Gendarmerie used bicycles with outrigger wheels, to mount patrols along the Siberian Railway before and during the Russo-Japanese War of 1905.(see illustration opposite).

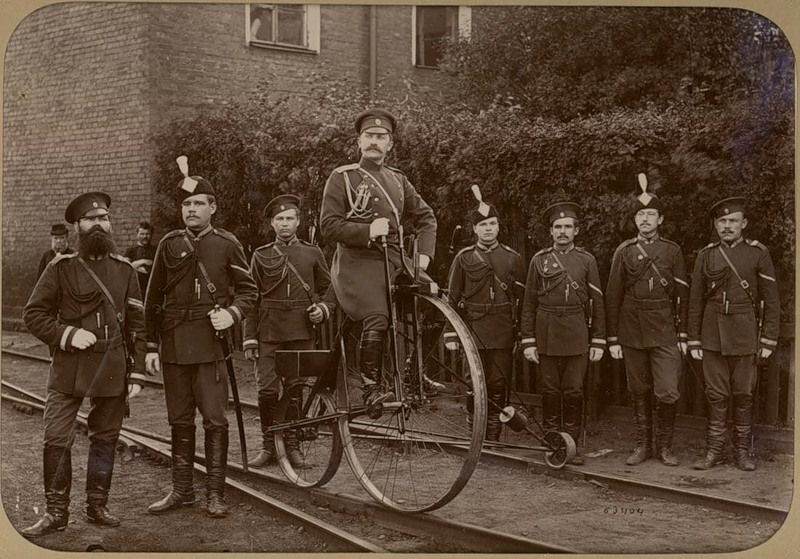
Russian Imperial Gendarmes with rail bicycle, circa 1900

Late in the 19th century the United States Army tested the bicycle's suitability for cross-country troop transport. The most extensive experimentation on bicycle units was carried out by 1st Lieutenant James A. Moss, of the 25th United States Infantry (Colored) (an African American infantry regiment with White officers). Using a variety of cycle models, Moss and his troops, accompanied by an assistant surgeon, carried out extensive bicycle journeys covering between 800 and 1,900 miles (1,300–3,100 km). In 1896, Moss's Buffalo Soldiers stationed in Montana rode bicycles across roadless landscapes for hundreds of miles at high speed. The "wheelmen" traveled the 1,900 miles to St. Louis, Missouri, in 40 days with an average speed of over 6 mph (9.7 km/h). A proposed ride from Missoula to San Francisco was not approved and the experiments terminated.

The first known use of the bicycle in combat occurred during the 1895 Jameson Raid, in which cyclists carried messages. In the Second Boer War military cyclists were used primarily as scouts and messengers. One unit patrolled railroad lines on specially constructed tandem bicycles that were fitted to the rails. Several raids were conducted by cycle-mounted infantry on both sides; the most famous unit was the Theron se Verkenningskorps (Theron Reconnaissance Corps) or TVK, a Boer unit led by the scout Daniel Theron, whom British commander Lord Roberts described as "the hardest thorn in the flesh of the British advance." Roberts placed a reward of £1,000 on Theron's capture and dispatched 4,000 soldiers to find and eliminate the TVK.

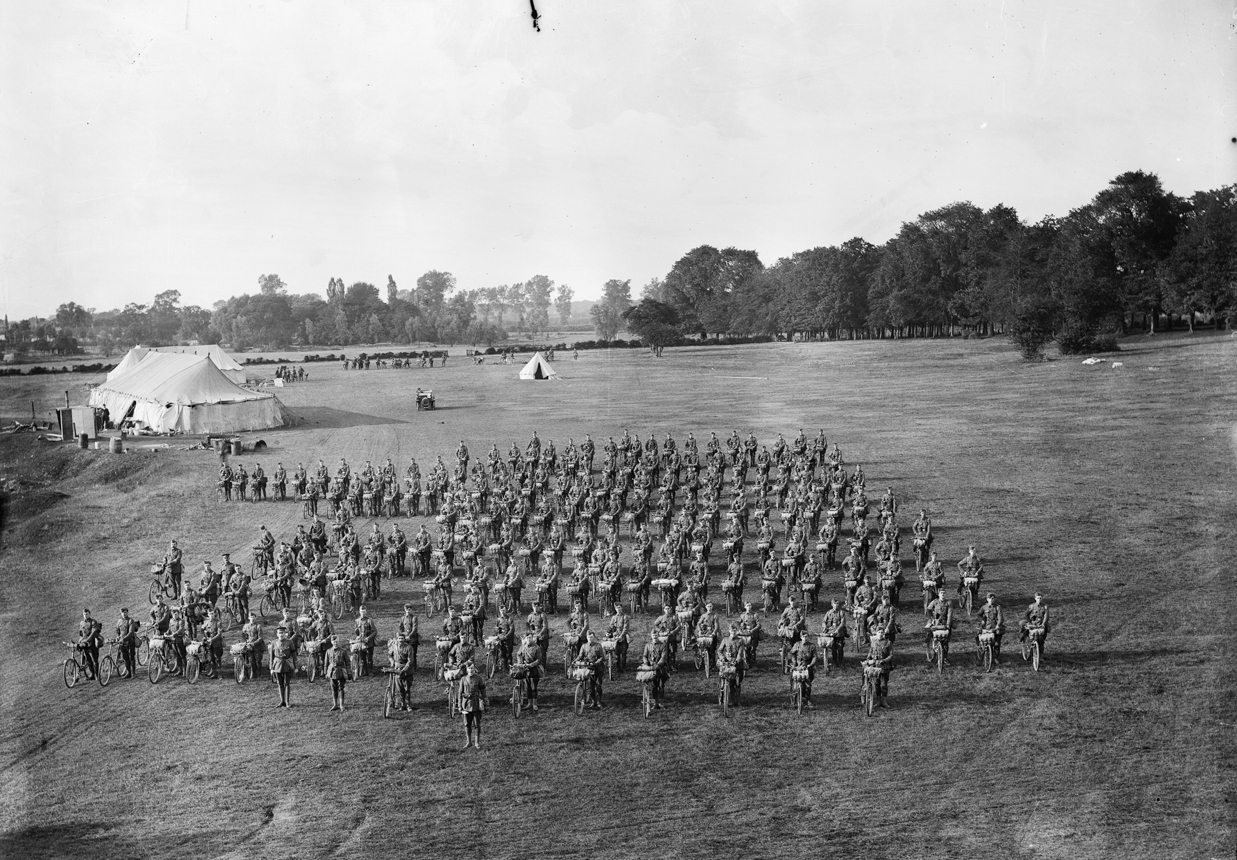
British Cycle Company drilling c. 1910, Bury St Edmunds, Suffolk, England

=== World Wars ===
During World War I cycle-mounted infantry, scouts, messengers and ambulance carriers were extensively used by all combatants. Italy used bicycles with the Bersaglieri (light infantry units) until the end of the war. German Army Jäger (light infantry) battalions each had a bicycle company (Radfahr-Kompanie) at the outbreak of the war, and additional units were raised during the war, bringing the total to 80 companies. A number of these were formed into eight Radfahr-Bataillonen (bicycle battalions). The British Army had cyclist companies in its divisions, and later two whole divisions became cyclists: 1st and 2nd Cyclist Divisions.

Prior to the start of trench warfare the level terrain in Belgium was well used by military cyclists. Each of the four Belgian carabinier battalions included a company of cyclists, equipped with a brand of folding bicycle named the Belgica. A regimental cyclist school gave training in map reading, reconnaissance, reporting and the carrying of verbal messages. Attention was paid to the maintenance and repair of the machine itself.

In its 1937 invasion of China, Japan employed some 50,000 bicycle troops. Early in World War II their southern campaign through Malaya en route to capturing Singapore in 1941 was largely dependent on bicycle-riding soldiers. In both efforts bicycles allowed quiet and flexible transport of thousands of troops who were then able to surprise and confuse the defenders. Bicycles also made few demands on the Japanese war machine, needing neither trucks nor ships to transport them, nor precious petroleum. Although the Japanese were under orders not to embark for Malaya with bicycles, for fear of slowing up amphibious landings, they knew from intelligence that bicycles were plentiful in Malaya and moved to systematically confiscate bicycles from civilians and retailers as soon as they landed. Using bicycles, the Japanese troops were able to move faster than the withdrawing Allied Forces, often successfully cutting off their retreat. The speed of Japanese advance, usually along plantation roads, native paths and over improvised bridges, also caught Allied Forces defending the main roads and river crossings by surprise, by attacking them from the rear. However, there were one or two cases of Australian troops turning the tables on the Japanese by isolating cycle troops from their accompanying motorized forces after blowing up bridges over rivers.

During the Invasion of Poland of 1939, most Polish infantry divisions included a company of bicycle-riding scouts. The equipment of each bicycle company included 196 bicycles, one motorcycle with sidecar, and nine horse-drawn supply carts, plus three to six anti-tank rifles and standard infantry equipment such as machine guns, rifles, pistols, and hand grenades.

The Finnish Army utilized bicycles extensively during the Continuation War and Lapland War. Bicycles were used as a means of transportation in Jaeger Battalions, divisional Light Detachments and regimental organic Jaeger Companies. Bicycle units spearheaded the advances of 1941 against the Soviet Union. Especially successful was the 1st Jaeger Brigade which was reinforced with a tank battalion and an anti-tank battalion, providing rapid movement through limited road network. During winter time these units, like the rest of the infantry, switched to skis. Within 1942–1944 bicycles were also added to regimental equipment pools. During the Summer 1944 battles against the Soviet Union, bicycles provided quick mobility for reserves and counter-attacks. In Autumn 1944 bicycle troops of the Jaeger Brigade spearheaded the Finnish advance through Lapland against the Germans; tanks had to be left behind due to the German destruction of the Finnish road network.

The hastily assembled German Volksgrenadier divisions each had a battalion of bicycle infantry, to provide a mobile reserve.

Allied use of the bicycle in World War II was limited, but included supplying folding bicycles to paratroopers and to messengers behind friendly lines. The term "bomber bikes" came into use during this period, as US forces dropped bicycles out of planes to reach troops behind enemy lines.

By 1939, the Swedish Army operated six bicycle infantry regiments. They were equipped with domestically produced Swedish military bicycles. Most common was the m/42, an upright, one-speed roadster produced by several large Swedish bicycle manufacturers. These regiments were decommissioned between 1948 and 1952, and the bicycles remained for general use in the Army, or were transferred to the Home Guard. Beginning in the 1970s, the Army began to sell these as military surplus. They became very popular as cheap and low-maintenance transportation, especially among students. Responding to its popularity and limited supply, an unrelated company, Kronan, began to produce a modernized version of the m/42 in 1997.

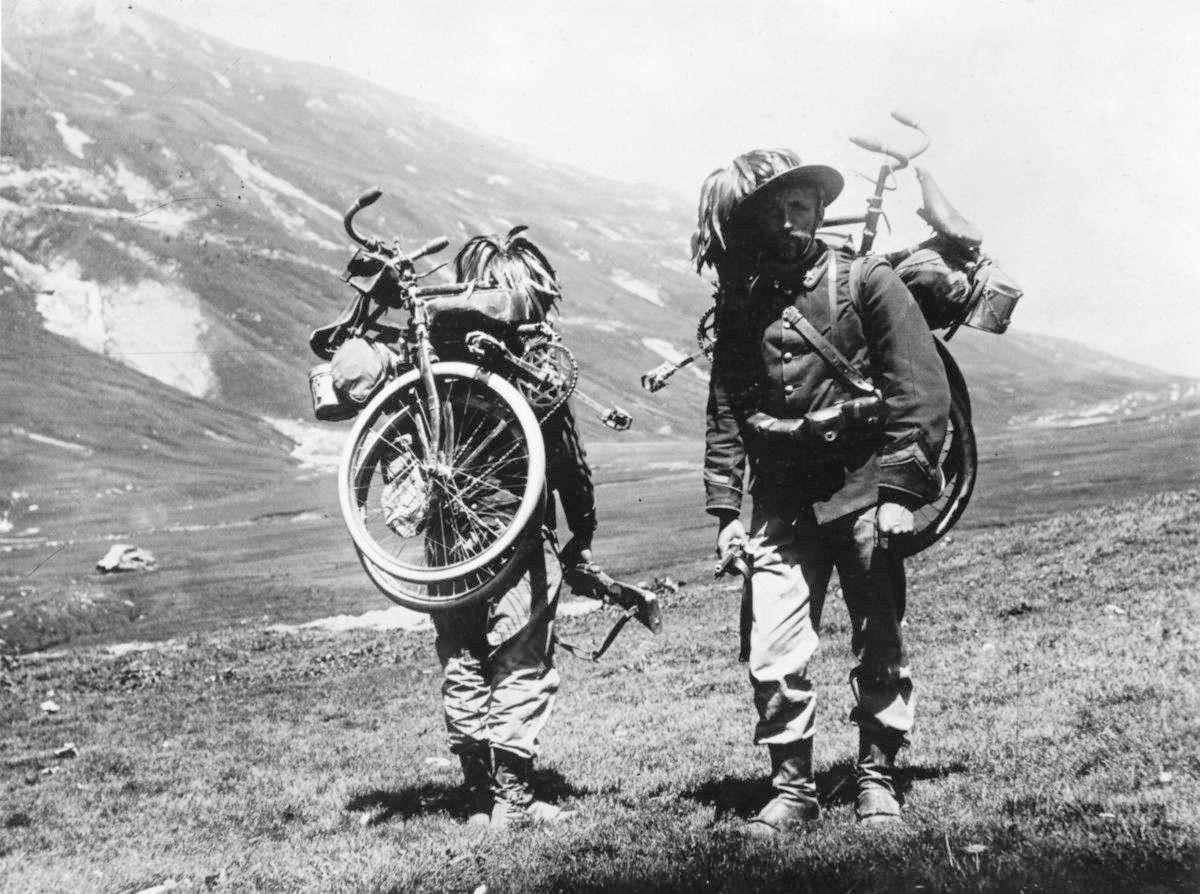
Italian Bersaglieri before World War I with folding bicycles strapped to their backs

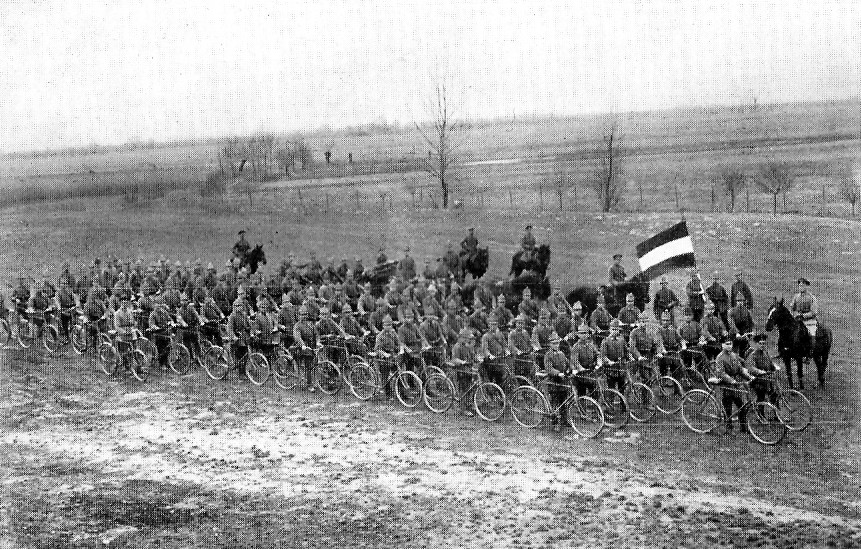
German bicycle infantry during World War I

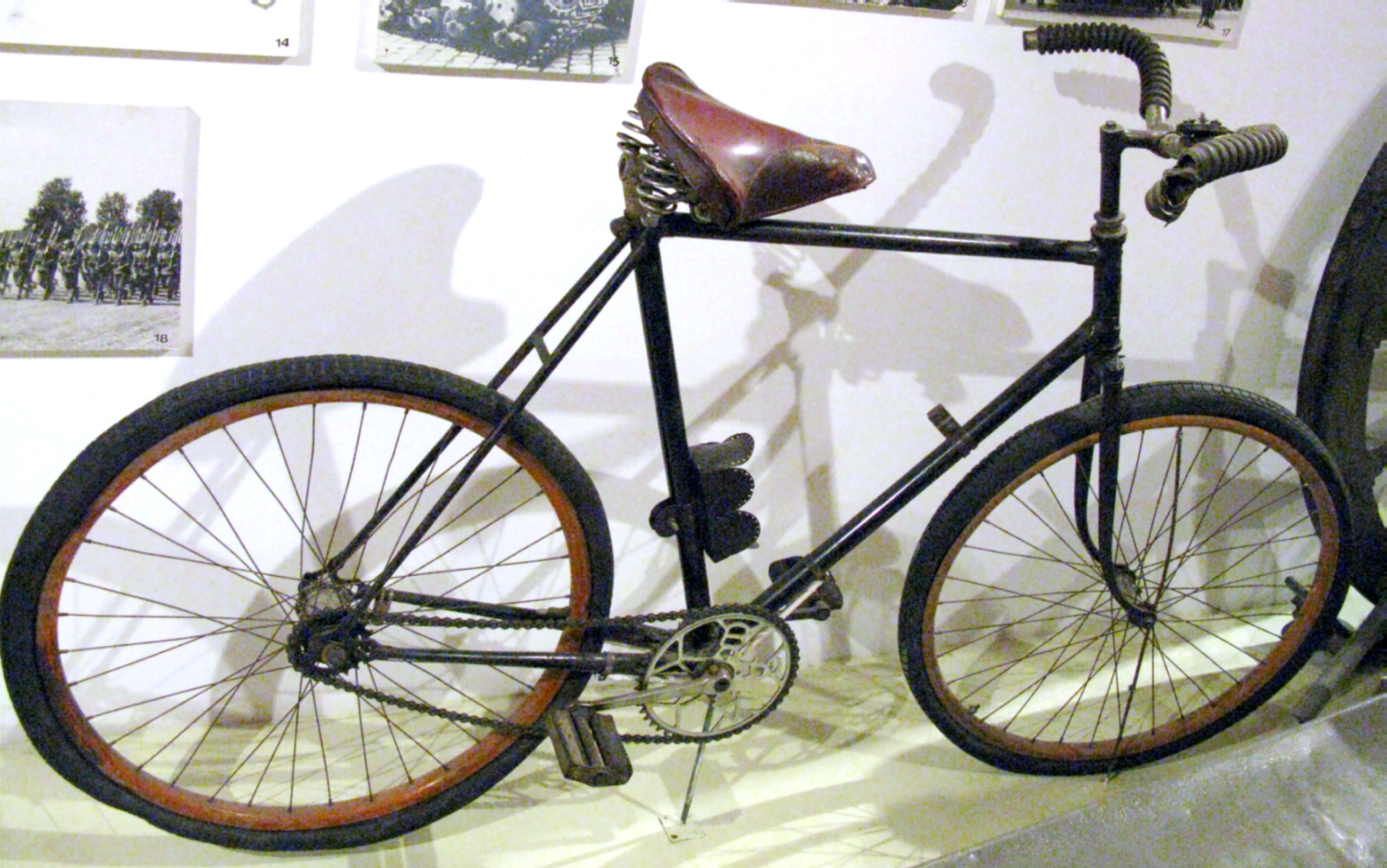
Most common bicycle used by Polish scout companies assigned to infantry divisions during the German invasion of Poland

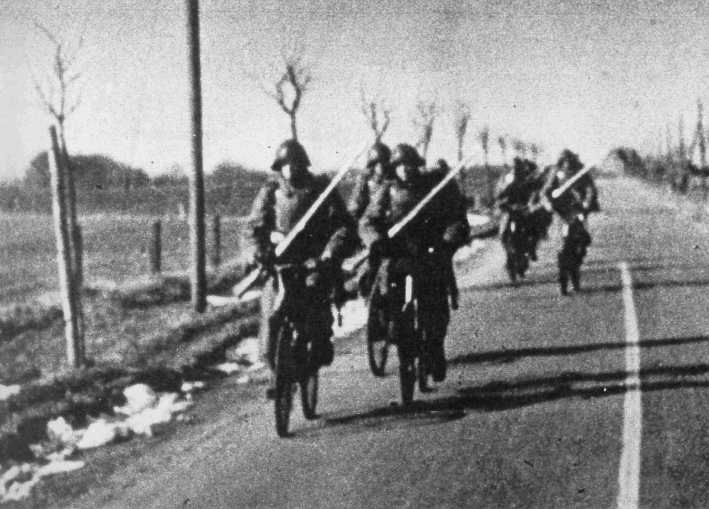
Danish soldiers cycling to the front to fight the Germans during the German invasion of Denmark in 1940

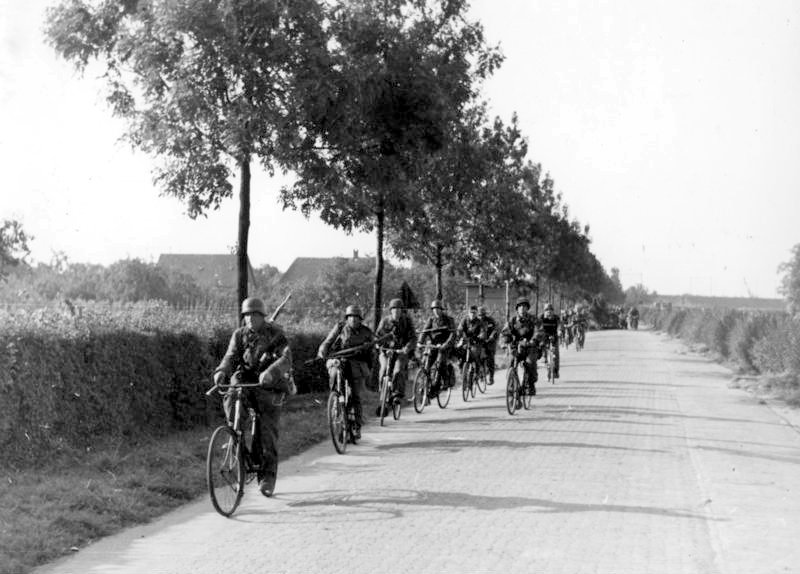
Wehrmacht troops advancing on bicycles in 1944

=== Later uses ===
Although much used in World War I, bicycles were largely superseded by motorized transport in more modern armies. In the past few decades, however, they have taken on a new life as a "weapon of the people" in guerrilla conflicts and unconventional warfare, where the cycle's ability to carry large, about 400 lb (180 kg), loads of supplies at the speed of a pedestrian make it useful for lightly equipped forces. For many years the Viet Cong and North Vietnamese Army used bicycles to ferry supplies down the "Ho Chi Minh trail", avoiding the repeated attacks of United States and Allied bombing raids. When heavily loaded with supplies such as sacks of rice, these bicycles were seldom rideable, but were pushed by a tender walking alongside. With especially bulky cargo, tenders sometimes attached bamboo poles to the bike for tiller-like steering (this method can still be seen practiced in China today). Vietnamese "cargo bikes" were rebuilt in jungle workshops with reinforced frames to carry heavy loads over all terrain.

=== 21st century ===
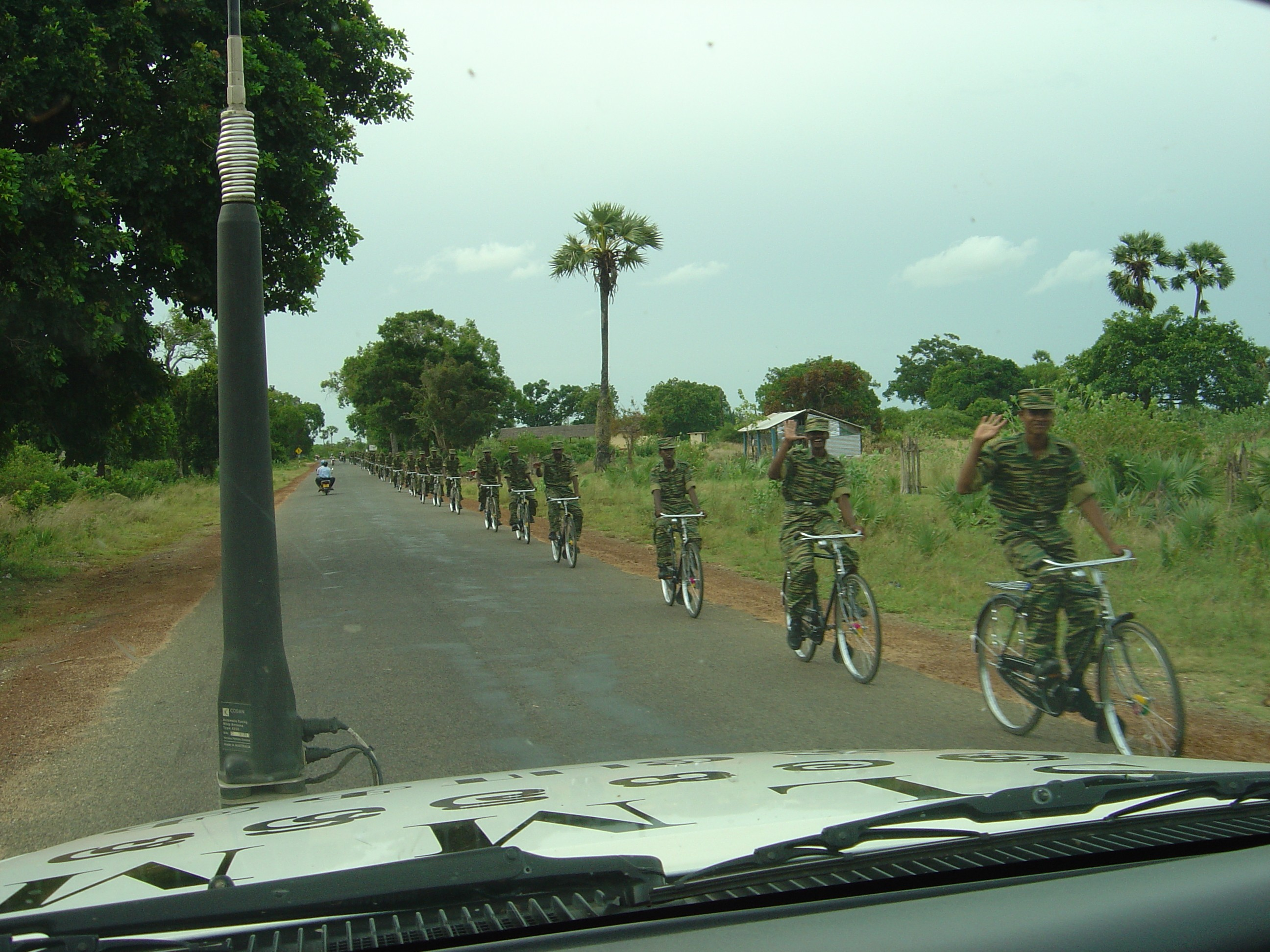
LTTE bicycle infantry platoon north of Kilinochchi, Sri Lanka, in 2004

The use of the cycle as an infantry transport tool continued into the 21st century. The Swiss Army's Bicycle Regiment, which maintained drills for infantry movement and attack using the Swiss army bicycle, was phased out in 2003.

Although the impact of bicycles is limited in modern warfare, the Finnish Defence Forces still trains all conscripts to use bicycles and skis. American Paratroopers have jumped folding mountain bikes in several Airborne operations.

The Liberation Tigers of Tamil Eelam made use of bicycle mobility during the Sri Lankan Civil War.

During the Russian invasion of Ukraine, electric bicycles were used by Ukrainian forces to carry NLAW anti-tank missiles.

== See also ==
- April 9th (film) – 2015 Danish film about a group of Danish bicycle infantry during the German invasion of Denmark (1940)
- Army Cyclist Corps
- Australian Cycling Corps
- Reich Labour Service

== General and cited references ==
- Leiser, Rolf (1991). Hundert Jahre Radfahrer-Truppe, 1891–1991 [Bicycle Troops, 1891–1991] (in German). Bern, Switzerland: Bundesamt für Mechanisierte u. Leichte Truppen. OCLC 885590986.
- Fitzpatrick, Jim (1998). The Bicycle in Wartime: An Illustrated History. Washington, D.C.: Brassey's Inc. ISBN 1-57488-157-4.
- Ekström, Gert; Husberg, Ola (2001). Älskade cykel (1st ed.). Bokförlaget Prisma. ISBN 91-518-3906-7.
- Koelle, Alexandra V. (2010). "Pedaling on the Periphery: The African American Twenty-fifth Infantry Bicycle Corps and the Roads of the American Expansion". The Western Historical Quarterly. 41 (3): 305–326. doi:10.2307/westhistquar.41.3.0305.
- Fletcher, Marvin E. (Autumn 1974). "The Black Bicycle Corps". Arizona and the West. 16 (3): 219–232. JSTOR 40168452.
