= M42 Truppenfahrrad =

German military bicycle

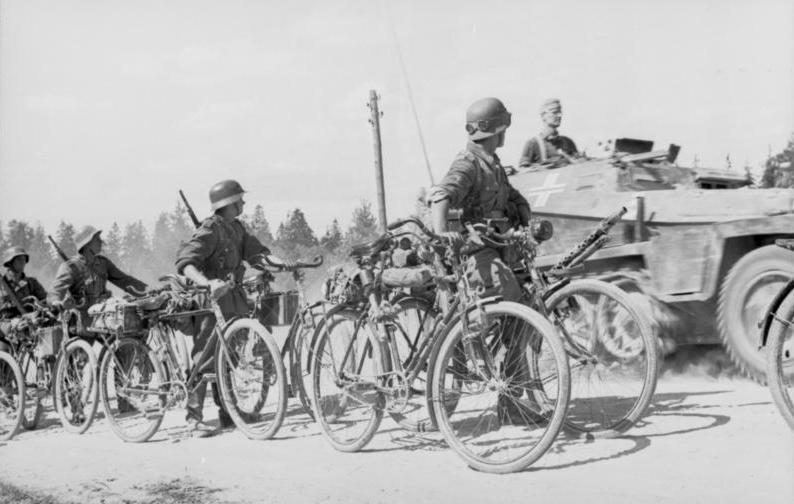
German soldiers with their M42 bicycles, Soviet Union 1941

The M42 Truppenfahrrad was a military bicycle issued to the Heer and Waffen SS during World War II. Special equipment for military use was: the steering bar, the saddle, the toolbox (which could be fitted with three grenades) and the porter at the back. On the steering bar were holders mounted for holding a variety of items, such as a half-shelter tent, clothing, and panzerfausts. The mid-section could be fitted to hold machineguns. The headlamp was made to work with dynamo and/or battery.

Numerous units of the German ground forces were equipped with bicycles. In addition to aiding troops in their movement, they were also used to deliver mail and maintain connections between a general and his troops, and for other purposes.
