= Swedish military bicycle =

Swedish military vehicle

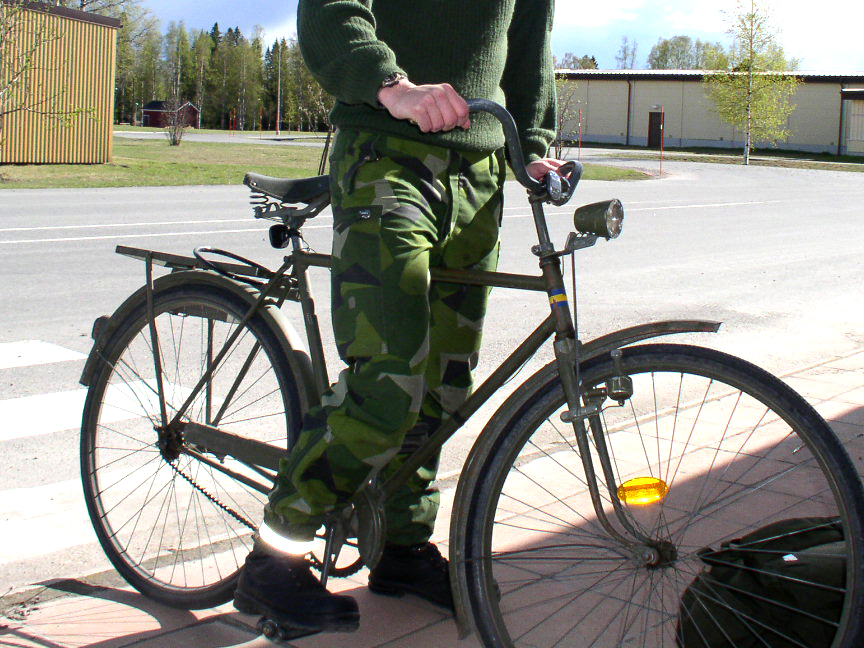
A Swedish army bicycle (m/104A) in use at Norrbotten Regiment, Boden, in 2004.

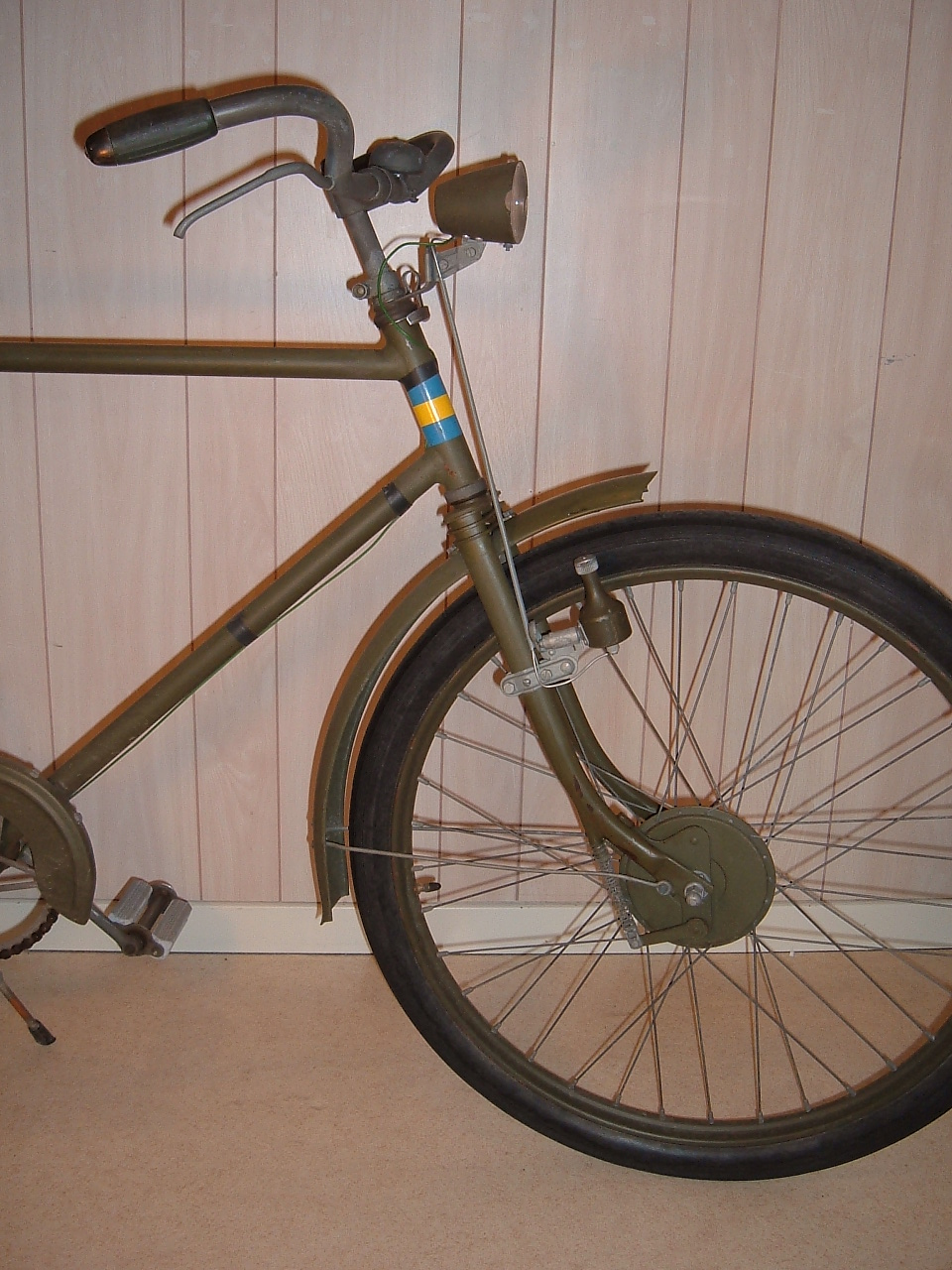
The unique chain-operated front brake of the m/42.

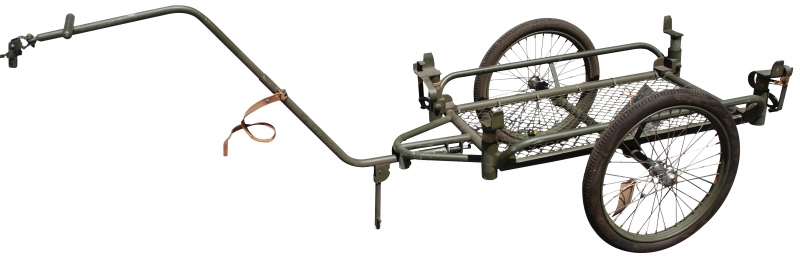
This folding Swedish military bicycle trailer, a 1945 Husqvarna S/78, was issued for use with the M/42, M/104A, and M/105A to transport injured troops on stretchers that were made to mount to it. It was also used for other cargo. They were manufactured in such large quantities by Husqvarna in the 40s that the supply lasted into the 70s when they were sold off into surplus.

Swedish military bicycles (Swedish: militärcykel), or Swedish army bicycles, have been used in the Swedish military for over a century.

== History ==
The first bicycles in the Swedish military were privately owned or bought for testing purposes. Bicycle infantry were first introduced in 1901, when the Gotland Infantry Regiment (I 27) in Visby, replaced its cavalry complement with bicycle-mounted troops. By 1942, there were six bicycle infantry regiments in the Swedish Army, operating mainly m/30s and m/42s. However, there were also examples of undesignated tandem bicycles for use by field radio operators and specially fitted pairs of bicycles designed for mounting a stretcher between the lead's rack and the rear's steer tube.

Following World War II, in 1947, the decision was made to decommission the bicycle infantry regiments. They were gradually removed from the Army between 1948 and 1952. Following this decision, the role of the bicycle shifted away from a combat one to a more utilitarian one, with special bicycle transport groups being formed. However, bicycle rifle battalions (Swedish: cykelskyttebataljon) continued to exist into the late 1980s.

== Models ==
- m/1901 - A safety bicycle, it was the first officially designated bicycle in the Swedish army.
- m/1927 - An Italian-manufactured Bianchi military bicycle bought by the Swedish military in 1930 to supplement the shortage of m/30s. This bicycle was able to be folded and carried on the soldiers back in rugged terrain.
- m/30 - This bicycle was very similar to the later issued m/42, except the pump was frame-mounted, the tools were stored in a frame-mounted leather bag, the carrier was the same sans the tool box, and although equipped with a front drum brake hub, there was no provision to use it. On the civilian model, the front drum brake was actuated by a brake cable connected to a brake handle. It differed noticeably from the German m/30, a spoon brake-equipped, balloon-tired roadster, though often mistaken for it. The Swedish m/30 was built according to specs established by an agreement with several large Swedish manufacturers regarding the interchangeability of parts, with most being assembled by Nymans (Hermes). Wheel size was 26 × 1½ inch (584 mm) and was equipped with a rear coaster-brake hub. Weight: ca. 23.5 kg (52 lb.)
- m/finsk - A Nymans-manufactured bicycle without chainguard. The label finsk is the Swedish word for Finnish.
- m/42 - The most well-known Swedish military bicycle. It was produced by several large Swedish bicycle manufacturers (Rex, Husqvarna, Monark, Nymans) from the 1940s to the 1950s with a maximum of interchangeable parts. It uses a rear, one-speed Novo C coaster brake hub, and a Husqvarna-produced front drum brake (chain-operated by an integrated right-hand lever). In addition, it has a large, sturdy rack with a tool box and storage tube for a short frame pump. Weight: up to 26 kg (57 lb)
- m/104A - 28 × ½ inch (635 mm) wheels with Novo CN coaster-brake rear hub and uses the same carrier as the m/42.
- m/105A - 26 × 1½ inch (584 mm) wheels with Sachs HR90V rear hub and uses the same carrier as the m/42.
- m/111 - Post-1971. 28 × ½ inch wheel with Sachs Torpedo rear hub. This is the rarest model, lacks the tool kit holder, and uses a carrier similar to Crescent-badged bicycles of the time.

== Tools ==
The following tools were issued with the bicycles as pictured in this section.

| These are the tools and accessories issued with the m/42. | These are the tools and accessories issued with the m/104a and m/105a. |

== Civilian use ==
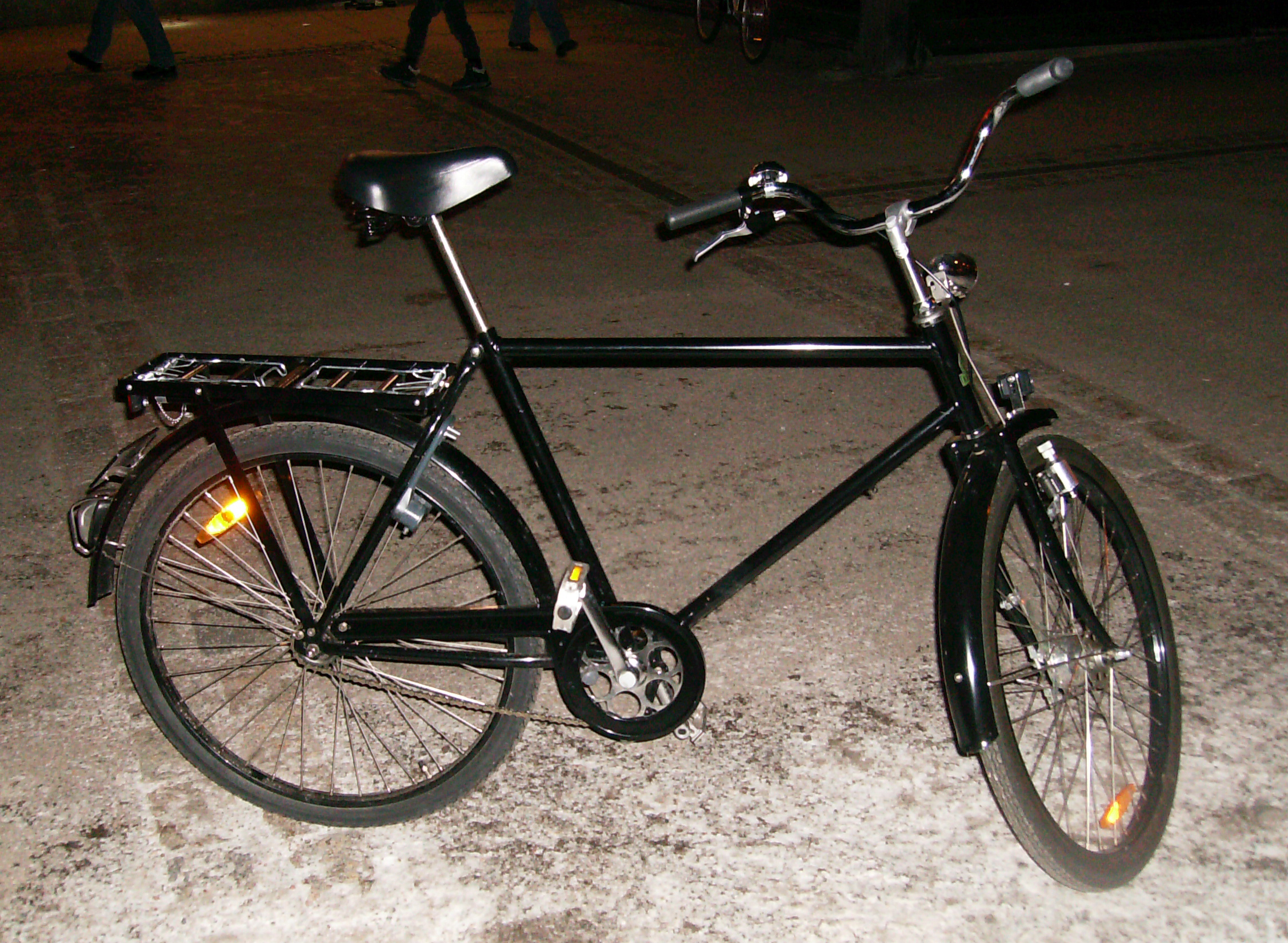
The civilian version of the m/42 is a Kronan Herrcykel (Men's Cycle) pictured here.

Beginning in the 1970s, the Army began to sell its m/42s, m/104as, and m/105as as military surplus. They became very popular as cheap and low-maintenance transportation, especially among students. Responding to its popularity and finite supply, an entirely new company, Kronan, was founded in 1997 by three students in Uppsala in order to produce a modernized replica of the m/42. These come in a variety of colors, compared to the matte green and gray of the surplus models, and can even be purchased with three-speed SRAM hubs and front brakes. Unlike the military surplus m/42s, these have been widely exported to other countries.

== See also ==
- Bicycle infantry
- Outline of cycling
- Military bicycle
- Swiss army bicycle
