= Shimano Nexus =

Brand of bicycle components

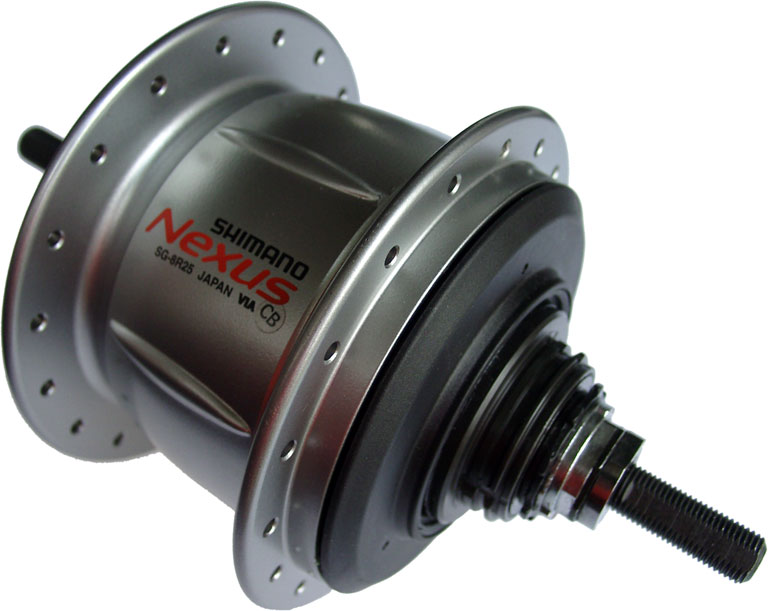
Shimano Nexus Inter 8 hub excluding auxiliary components.

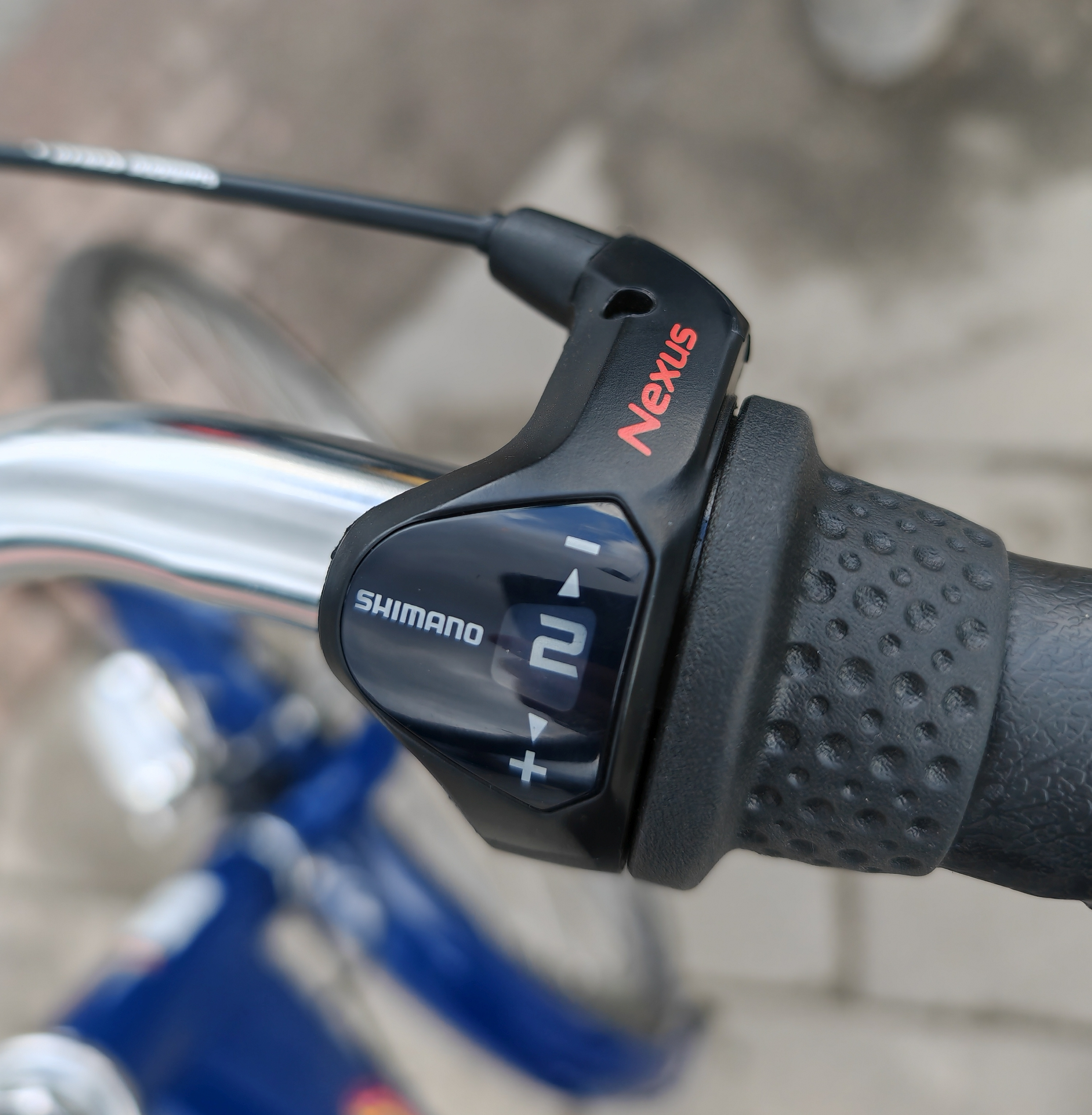
Shimano Nexus gear shift lever.

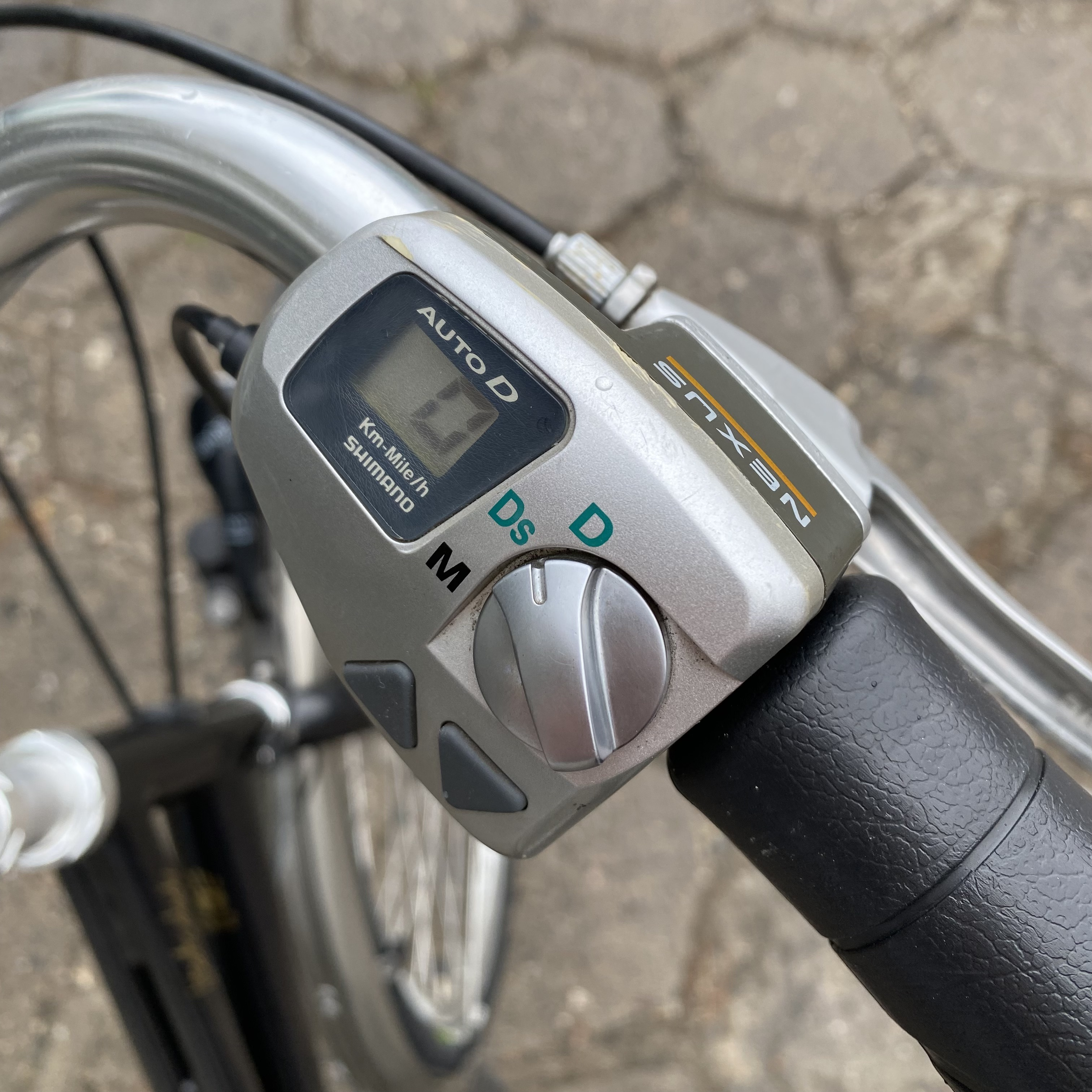
Shimano Nexus Auto-D automatic gear shifter

Shimano Nexus is a brand of bicycle components which includes products such as epicyclical gear hubs, cranksets, shifters, brake levers, hub brakes, hub dynamos, and a CPU for automatically changing gears. The series is primarily aimed at the "comfort" market such as urban commuters and tourers, and as such is not made to withstand the rigours of off-road or mountain biking. The free-wheeling Nexus internal gear hubs were initially only compatible with Shimano's "roller brake", its version of a drum brake, but not with the Shimano disc brakes used with the higher-end Shimano Alfine internal gear hubs, but a compatible version of most hubs was added in a revision of the line-up in the 2020s.

== History ==
In 1995, Shimano rolled out its Nexus line of seven- and four-speed internal hubs. These had a new rotary actuator that did away with externally protruding gear shifting elements in the rear wheel. Also, the gear units were able to be shifted under moderate pedaling loads. Shimano had manufactured three speed hubs prior to that, and these hubs were at that point re-branded Nexus. In the early 2000s the 8-speed Nexus hub gear was introduced, having two stepped planetary series mounted downstream of each other. The hub was operated with a twist shifter. By November 2006, The Nexus range came in several ranges (Inter 3, Inter 7 and Inter 8) providing 3, 7 and 8 speed models respectively.

== Internal gear hubs ==
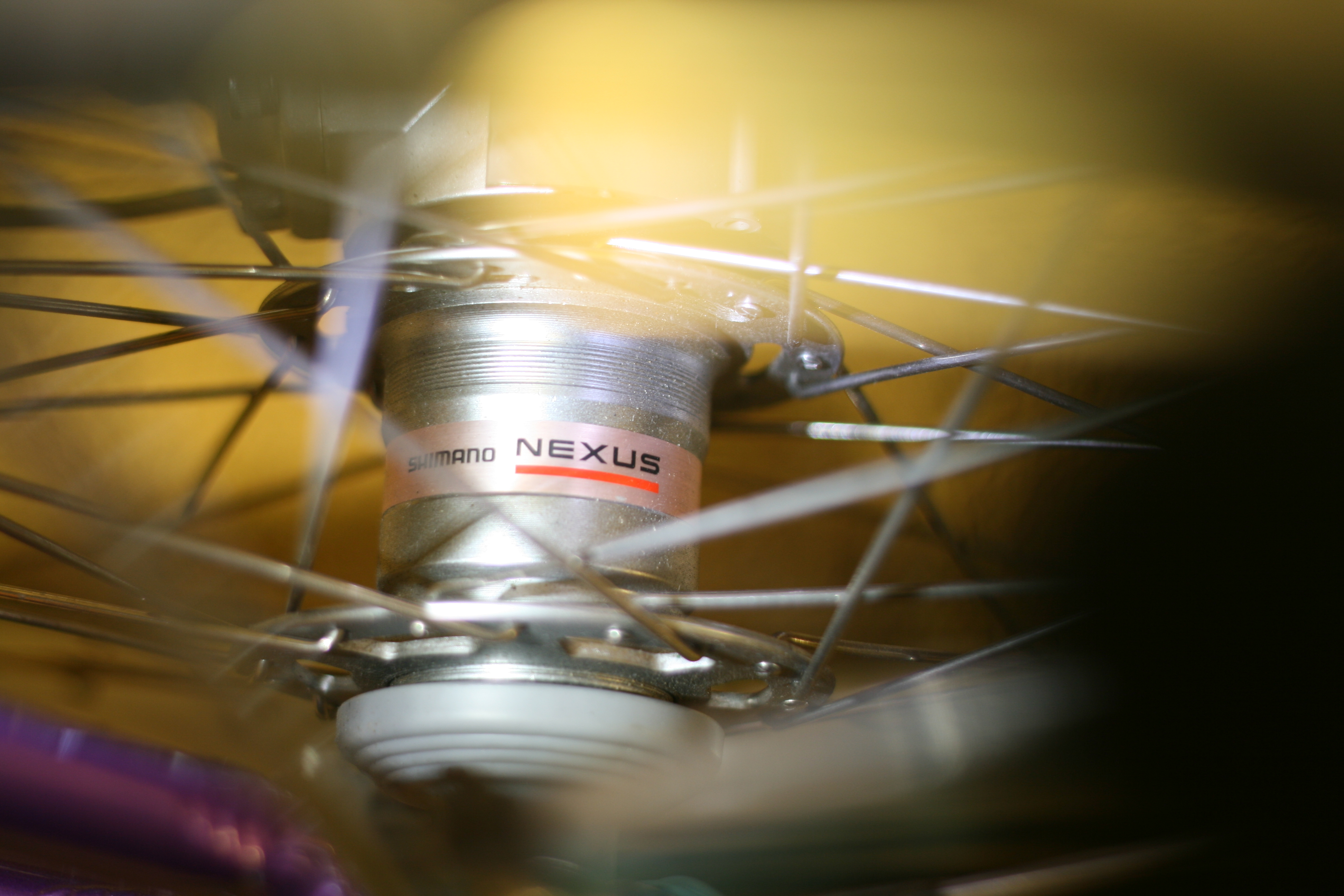
Shimano Nexus Inter 3 hub laced with spokes and mounted on a bicycle.

Inter 3 - This hub has three speeds with 36% intervals and an overall gear range of 186%. It weighs 1220 grams stripped in its basic version (without built-in brake). Other versions include coaster, roller or disk brake. Starting from around 2011 Shimano offers a model with a rotary shifting mechanism similar to the one originally developed for the Inter 7 instead of the push rod/bell crank mechanism.

Auto 3 - The hub is fitted with a 3 speed automatic gear system, which utilizes a front hub dynamo to power a CPU that automatically changes the three speed internally geared hub. A similar system was built for the nexus 4.

Inter 4 - Nexus Inter 4 hubs had four speeds, but the same 186% range as the Inter 3. It only geared up, so a relatively large rear sprocket was necessary to give a reasonable development when combined with a normal front sprocket. It has been discontinued and spare parts have become hard to source.

Inter 5 - Apparently in 2012 Shimano has started making Nexus Inter 5 hubs. A forum discussion contains a link to one of two parts lists at Shimano. Range reportedly 0.75 to 1.545 for a total range of 206%. A glance on the Web confirms: Pricing seems to be near Inter 3, availability in the US seems limited. The Shimano Products Line-Up Chart shows For Japan market.

Inter 5E - A 5-speed hub targeted at the e-bike market, launched in 2019. Unrelated to the previous Inter 5 model. Available with a conventional twist-grip for mechanical shifting (SG-C7000-5X series), or with an automatic shifter (SG-C7050-5X series) integrated with the Shimano STEPS e-bike system released in 2021. Shimano claims improvements in shifting under torque and rotation durability over the C6000-series Nexus 8 hubs. The Inter 5E shares its hub shell with the Nexus 8, distinguishing itself from the earlier Inter 5.

Inter 7 - The Inter 7 comes in two versions with either a steel or aluminium shell, weighing 1860 and 1460 grams respectively, the latter more expensive yet relatively reasonably priced. The gear mechanisms are operated with a Revo Twist Shifter or a simple non-ratcheting trigger shifter and are identical in the two versions, offering a range of 244% with non-even interval percentages of 17, 14, 17, 16, 17 and 16.

Inter 8 - The Inter 8 has interval percentages between the gears of 22, 16, 14, 18, 22, 16, 14, and a total range of 307%, comparable to a road bike derailleur gear systems, but as the other Nexus products, it is designed and intended for urban commuter use. The hub comes in a variety of versions, weighing between 1550 and 2040 grams stripped. The newest high end models are internally very similar to the Alfine model. The Inter 8 is more tolerant of shifting under load than the Inter 7.

A shimano branded maintenance kit consisting of a mineral oli with dyes and additives can be sold to maintain shimano internal gear hubs.

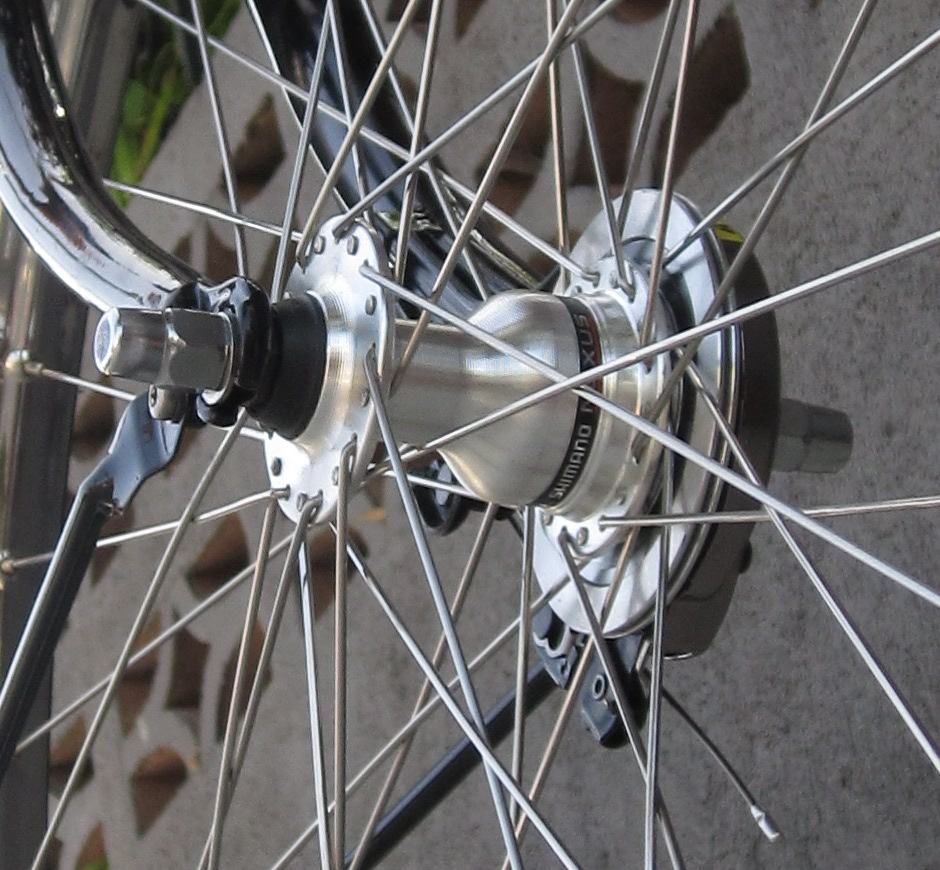
Nexus front hub with attached roller brake.

== Roller brakes ==
The Shimano-invented "roller brake" works similarly to a drum brake, but is a separate unit fitted to the side of the hub via a spline on the side of compatible hubs. It is lubricated with a dedicated lubricant which needs occasional replenishing and is sold separately by Shimano.

Most roller brakes come with an integrated aluminium cooling disc to dissipate the heat of braking. Higher end parts have larger discs with some also having fins and larger v-shaped brake surfaces.

The latest line-up (as of 2026) also includes a version with a disc brake spline. These hubs have a different spline and do not accept a roller brake, but they work the same otherwise and parts are largely compatible.

Most of the Nexus gear hubs also come in a coaster brake version. These have different hub shells with an included brake surface and slightly different mechanics, and do not have a spline to connect external brakes to.

Bikes with rim brakes generally use the same hub as the roller brake, but with the spline blanked with a protective cover.

== See also ==
- Comparison of hub gears
- Shimano Alfine
