= Shimano Alfine =

Product series by Shimano

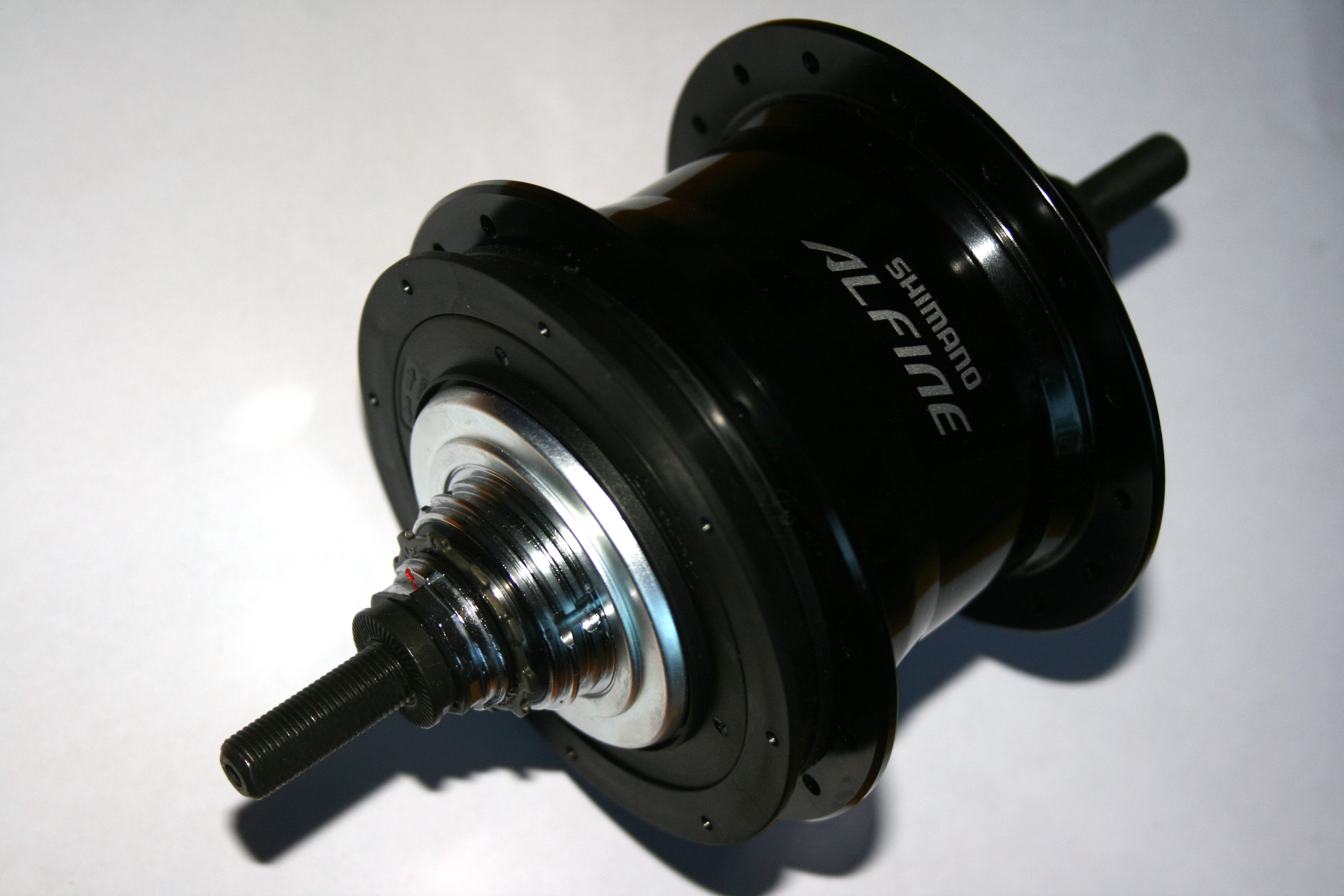
Shimano Alfine SG-S700 11 speed epicyclic internally geared hub, without auxiliary components.

Alfine is a comfort and urban oriented product series by Shimano. It is mainly known for internally geared hubs, but includes also hydraulic disc brakes and levers, chain tensioners, dynamo hubs, cranksets, shift levers, and complete wheels.

== Alfine 500 ==
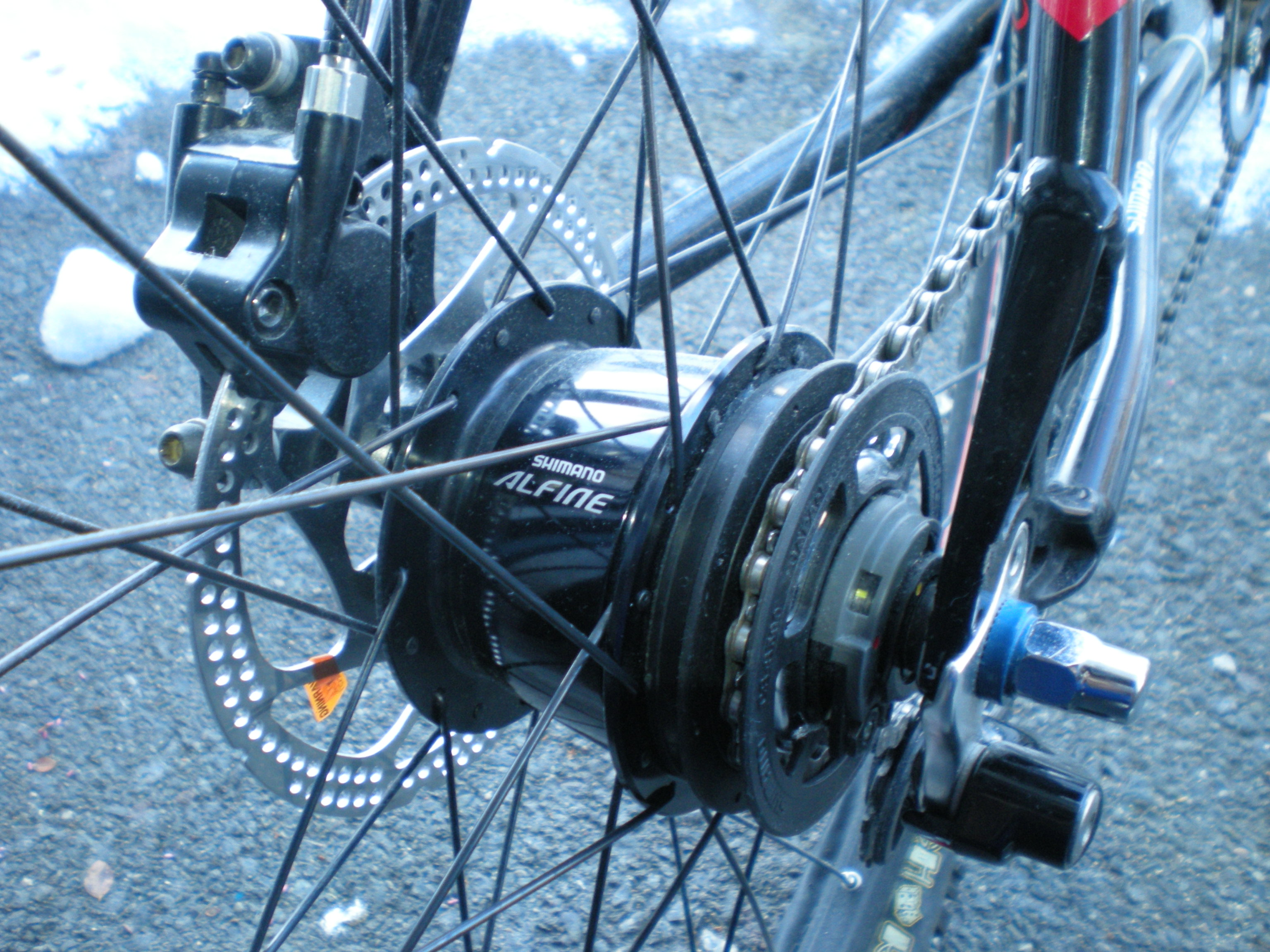
Shimano Alfine SG-S500 8 speed epicyclic internally geared hub, laced with spokes and mounted on bicycle.

The Alfine 500 group, first introduced at Eurobike in 2006, included the epicyclic hub gear SG-S500. The internal mechanical design of the gear hub was based on that of the Shimano Nexus Inter 8, with two stepped planetary series, 5th gear being 1:1 direct drive, thus offering 8 speeds with percent intervals of 22,16,14,18,22,16,14, and an overall gear range of 307%, yet in a more attractive design than the Nexus, with better seals allowing slightly greater ruggedness, more attractive auxiliary components such as e.g. a ratcheting trigger shifter similar to the high-end Shimano derailleur shifters, and a hub shell with splines for mounting a disc brake rotor of the center lock standard. These mechanisms are grease-lubricated.

For 2013 a new 505 model is being offered with Di2 electronic shifting.

Gear	1	2	3	4	5	6	7	8
Ratio	0.527	0.644	0.748	0.851	1.000	1.223	1.419	1.615

== Alfine 700 ==
Alfine 700 is an internal epicyclic hub gear for bicycles, manufactured by Shimano since 2010. The 700 has 11 speeds, with intervals of approximately 29% for the first to second gear gap, and 13% - 14% for the other gears, resulting in an overall gear range of 409%. There is no direct drive 1:1 gear. It is operated by a single ratcheting trigger shifter with two-way release. When introduced it had a claimed weight of approximately 1600g without auxiliary components (bolts, actuator, cog, wire, shifter). Production models appeared to have a somewhat beefed up design. The internal mechanisms comprise three stepped planetary series in a sealed oil bath, for greater power transfer efficiency.

For 2013 a new 705 model is being offered with Di2 electronic shifting. This version differs slightly from the 700 model and requires a motor unit with a battery, and an electronic shifter. Shimano offers different styles of electronic shifters that fit a wider range of handlebars than the trigger shifter for the 700 model. It is not possible to use the motor unit or electronic shifters with the 700 model.

Gear	1	2	3	4	5	6	7	8	9	10	11
Ratio	0.527	0.681	0.770	0.878	0.995	1.134	1.292	1.462	1.667	1.888	2.153

Alfine-11 Schematic diagram

== See also ==
- Comparison of hub gears
- Shimano Nexus
