= Kronan (company) =

Kronan Cykel log

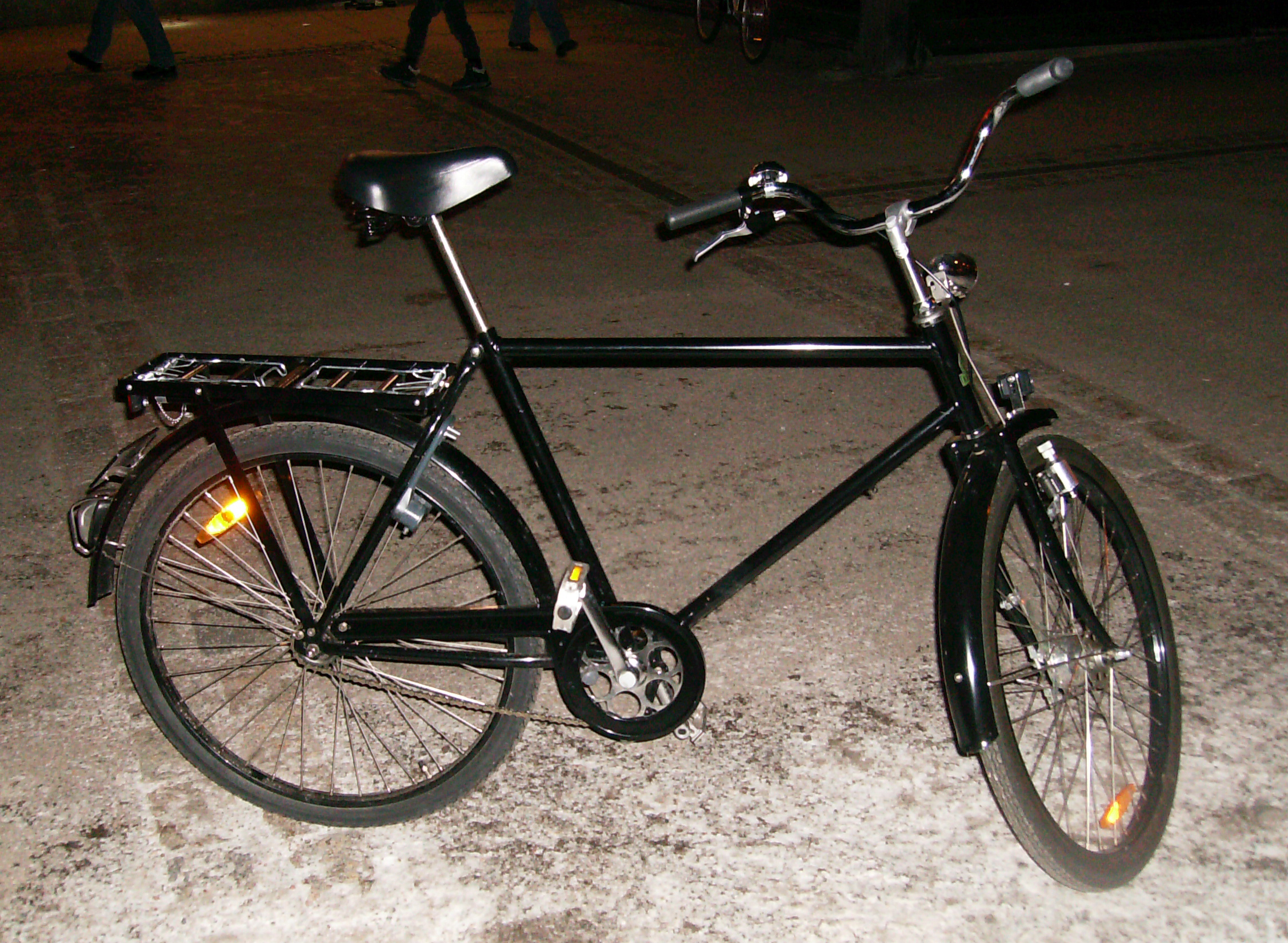
A black Kronan cycle

Kronan (Swedish: The Crown) bicycles are marketed by Kronan Trademark AB, also known as Kronan AB. Kronan AB was established in June 1997 by three former-students, John Wahlbäck and the Avander brothers, Henry and Martin. In autumn 2003 the company was bought by the Brunstedt family with Mary Brunstedt as the company's current CEO.

== History ==
Kronan began when John Wahlbäck sold surplus Swedish military m/42 bikes, to supplement his income as a student. They decided to manufacture a copy of this after selling all their original stock. Kronan bought the original drawings from the Swedish Ministry of Defense and commissioned a Taiwanese manufacturer to build bicycles to these specifications.

The current Kronan Bicycle has been modernized slightly, but has the same basic design as the original. It is assembled in Poland using parts from Asia. The original Kronan factory was in Malmö.

Until about 2000 Kronan bikes were only available in a limited number of colors, with a single gear and coaster brakes. New models have been added with 3-speed SRAM hub gears and drum brakes.

Other variants include a child's bike (Kiddo), a traditionally-styled bike (Kranny) and a tricycle (Kargo). All these bikes have a bottle dynamo front light (the rear is operated by a battery) and panniers as standard.

== Models ==
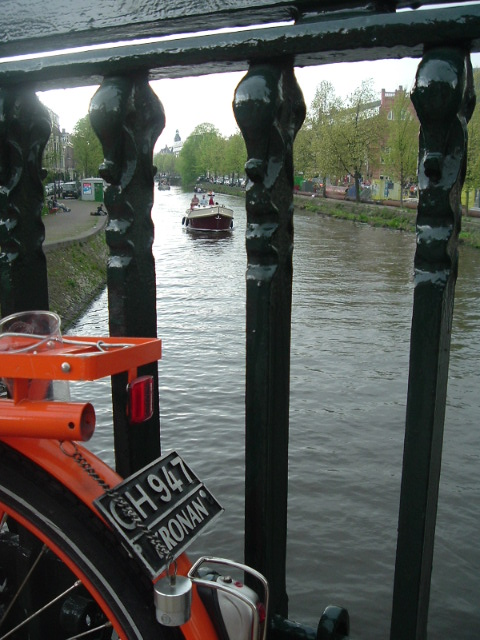
Details of a Kronan in Amsterdam.

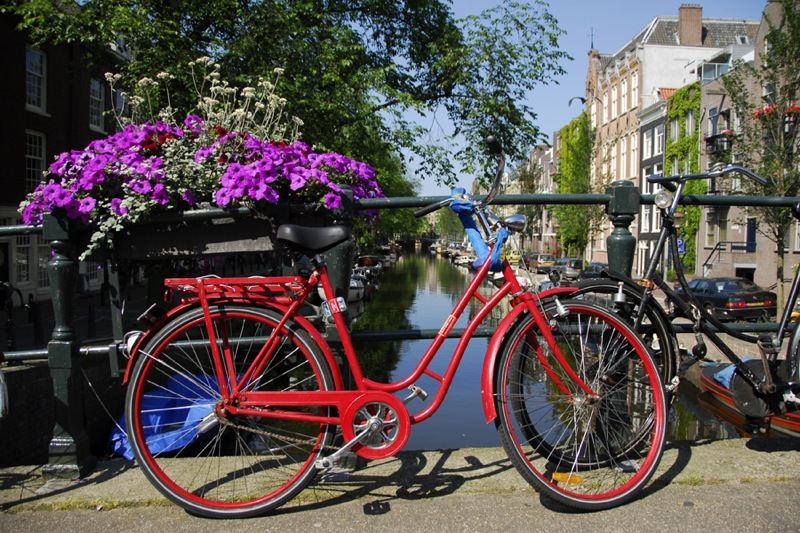
Kronan woman's in red

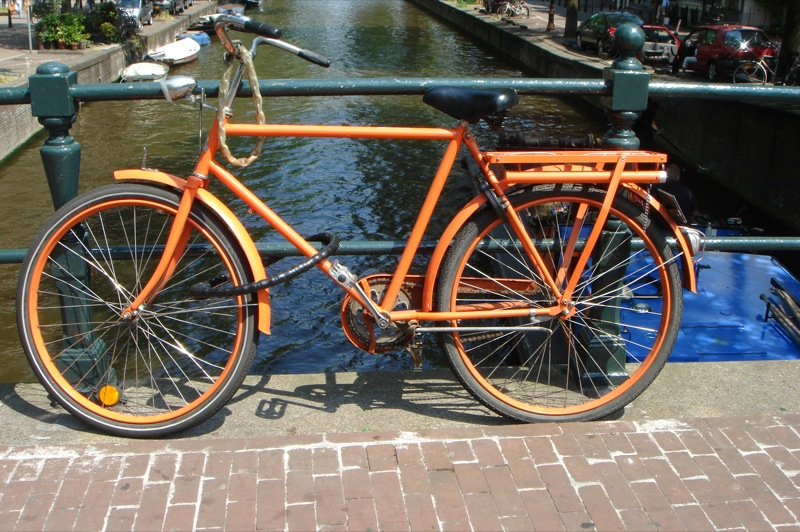
Kronan men's in orange

- Diamond Frame, single gear, coaster brake
- Diamond Frame, 3-speed, front roller brake, rear coaster brake
- Step-through, single gear, coaster brake
- Step-through, 3-speed, front roller brake, rear coaster brake
- Step-through Unitube, 5-speed, front roller brake, rear coaster brake (USA only - no longer available)

== Specs ==
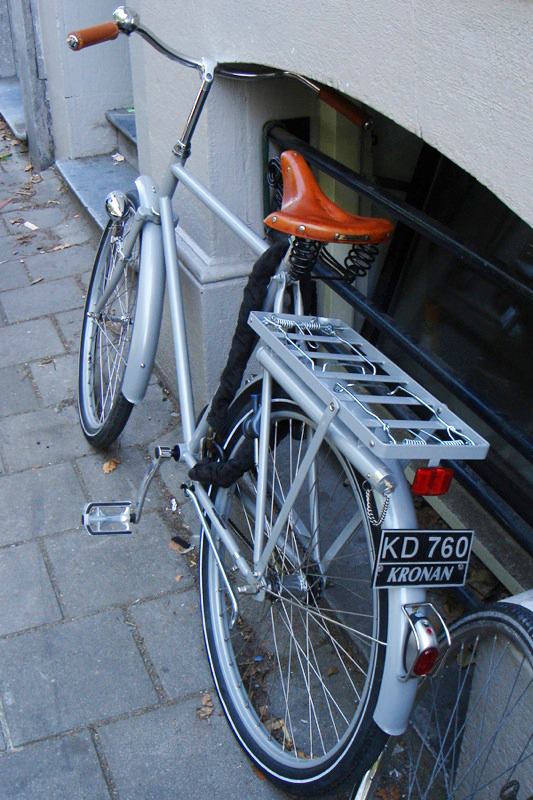
Kronan bike in Amsterdam

- Frame: Cromoly diamond and step through with 1 or 3 three speeds
- Forks: Cromoly
- Wheels: Miche, aluminum
- Rear hub: Shimano 1-spd or SRAM T 3-spd S3 Spectro with coaster brake.
- Chain: KMC 108 links
- Crankset: Shimano steel 46T
- Pedals: Aluminum spindle
- Tires: Continental
  - Men's bikes: 26 in × 1 1/2 in × 2 in (660 mm × 38 mm × 51 mm) (54-584) 650B
  - Ladies' bikes: 28 in × 1 5/8 in × 1 3/4 in (711 mm × 41 mm × 44 mm) (47-622) 700C
- Saddle: Cushioned w/ vinyl upholstery
- Rear light: Darkness & motion activated. .06 watts. Stainless steel cover & cage
- Front light: Front wheel Bottle dynamo generator - 6 volt, 3 watts
- Brakes: Drum brake SRAM T3
- Luggage carrier: Painted steel w/ 2 chrome spring clips and airpump holder. Pump included!
- Bell: Stainless steel w/ Kronan logo
- Fenders and chainguard
- Colours:
  - Men's - blue, black, brown, and occasionally green, and red.
  - Ladies - red, pink and black.

All Kronan bicycles have following basic equipment: large tires for more comfort in the city, a rear license plate, extra large saddle, coaster brake and front hub brake (As of March 2007, all Kronan models are equipped with a hand brake), dynamo powered front and automatic rear light, rear rack (7 in or 180 mm wide and 18 in or 460 mm front to back), stainless steel chain and spokes, steel frame with extra coating for protection, and rims and fenders/mudguards in steel in same color as frame, internal gear hubs, kick stand, bell, and air pump.

== Accessories ==
- Frame mounted wheel lock
- Front rack - frame-mounted and measures 12.5 inches (320 mm) deep by 16.5 inches (420 mm) wide with 35 pound capacity.
- Front basket - wire or wicker
- Brooks brand Saddles and bags
- GMG Dutch child seat
- RackPack Carradice Bags

== Corporate advertising ==
Several companies have incorporated Kronan bicycles into their employees and customer reward programs, or purchased a fleet of Kronan bikes for use by employees and customers. These bicycles usually have a signboard underneath their crosstube advertising the company.

- British Airways
- Ikea
- Volvo
- Body Shop
- Hennes & Mauritz
- ABB
- Wallpaper magazine
- Dagens Nyheter

== See also ==
- Monark - manufacturers similar utility bikes
- Helkama Jääkäri - Finnish version
