= Military bicycle =

Bicycle adapted to the needs of armed forces

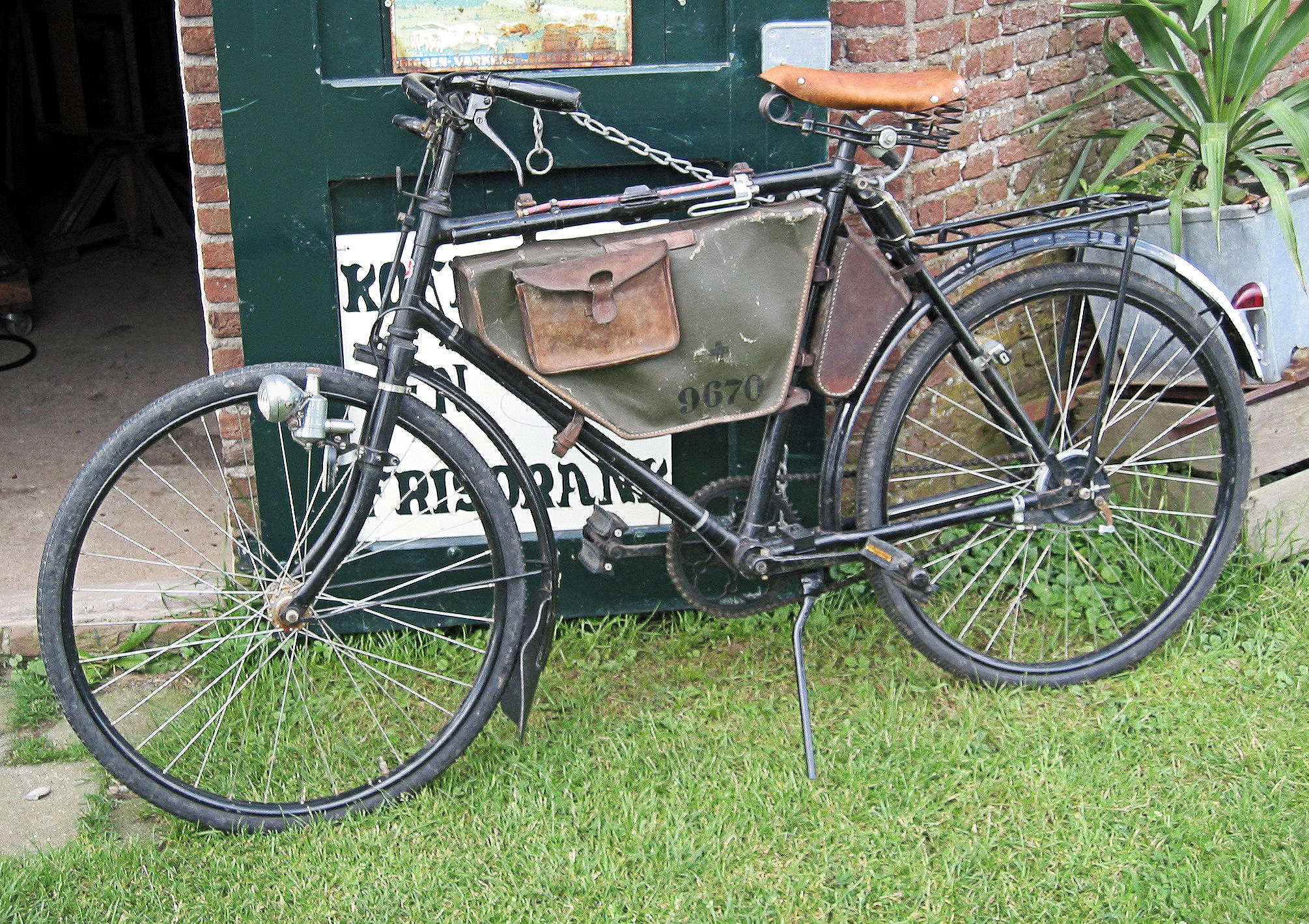
MO-05 of the Swiss Army

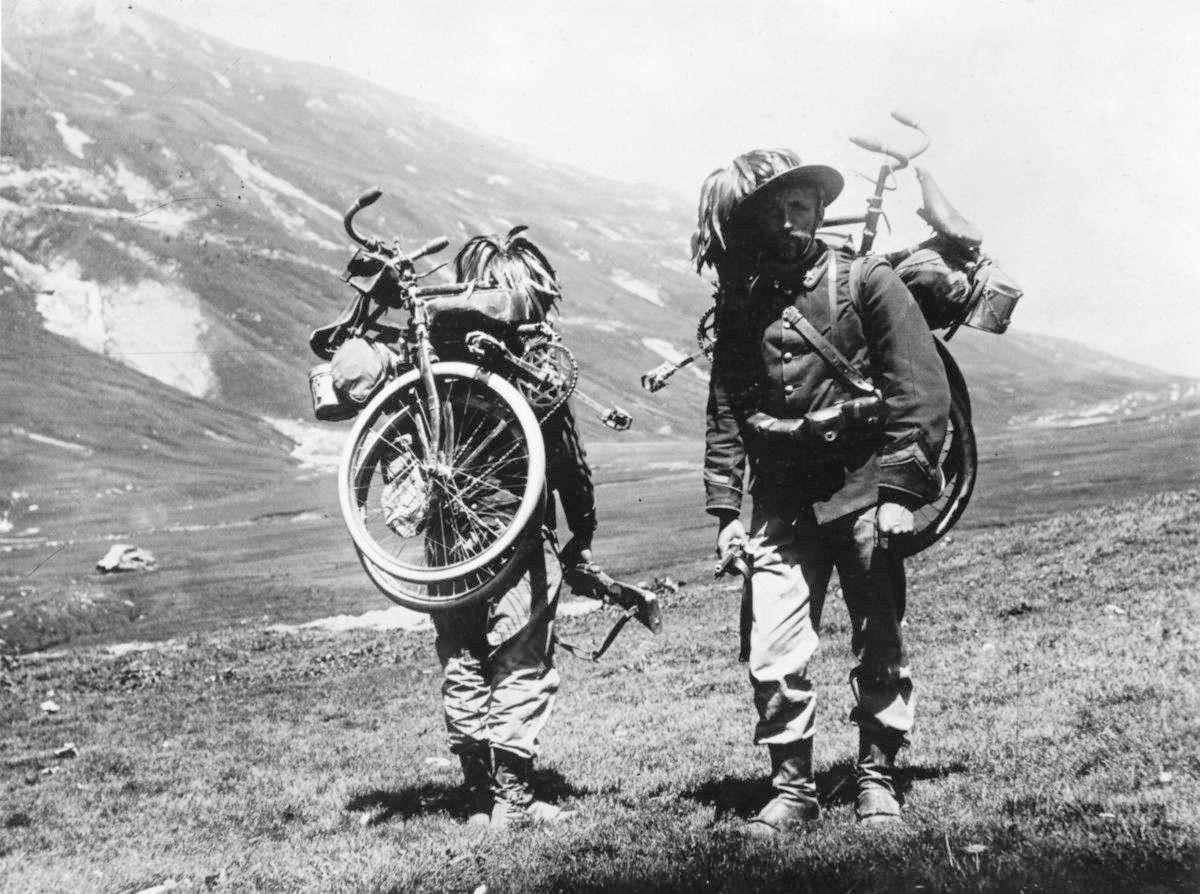
World War I Italian Bersaglieri with folding bicycles

A military bicycle is a bicycle specially adapted to the needs of armed forces. In use since the early 20th century in many armies throughout the world, bicycles allow for silent movement and increased mobility on the battlefield. Additional advantages of military bicycles are that they allow individual soldiers to carry more supplies without being encumbered and are very inexpensive to manufacture and maintain when compared to horses and vehicles.

== History ==
The first bicycles were introduced into the armed forces of several nations in the late 19th century. By 1890 the Austro-Hungarian army used the Waffenrad model from the Austrian Weapons Factory Company (ÖWG) in Steyr. In 1897 the U.S. 25th Infantry Bicycle Corps used a Spalding Military 'Special' model. From 1900 Germany's Bielefelder Maschinenfabrik AG produced its bicycle model "Diana 30" as a military bicycle. By the time of the start of World War I, all combatants were using them. The German Army had 36 independent companies of bicycle infantry, a battalion of cyclists attached to every cavalry division, and an additional 10 reserve bicycle companies and 17 replacement crews. The Italian Army's Bersaglieri troops were the first to use folding bikes. The U.S. Army used a Columbia military model. During World War II bicycles were introduced to paratroopers as a means to provide them with transportation following the landing. The U.S. also used them as general light transport, and for messenger duties. Separate units of bicycle infantry existed in armies of many nations until the end of 20th century; it was not until 2003 that the Swiss Army reformed its last three Bicycle Infantry Regiments. In the late 1990s and early 2000s, there was a resurgence in the testing of all terrain and folding bikes for use by infantry in battle and patrolling cities.

Some innovations introduced in bicycles designed for military use found their way to civilian markets as well, such as coaster brakes and the cyclometer.

In modern times, bicycles and electric bicycles are still used by many armies around the world, but there are no separate bicycle infantry units.

== See also ==
- Bicycle Infantry
- Swedish military bicycle
- Swiss army bicycle
- M42 Truppenfahrrad
