= Military spacecraft =

Military spacecraft may refer to:

- Military satellite, satellites used for military purposes
- Space weapon, a weapon used for space warfare
