= BA-30 =

Soviet half-tracked armored car

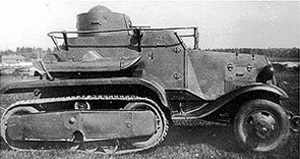
- Type: Half-track
- Place of origin: Soviet Union

Service history
- Used by: Soviet Union

Specifications
- Mass: 4.6 tonnes
- Length: 4.94 m
- Width: 2.4 m
- Height: 4.6 m
- Crew: 3
- Armor: 6 mm
- Main armament: DT machine gun (1512 rounds)
- Engine: GAZ-M1 gasoline engine 50 hp (37 kW)
- Power/weight: 10.9 hp/tonne
- Suspension: half track
- Operational range: 253 km
- Maximum speed: 37 km/h

The BA-30 was a Soviet half-track armored car developed in 1937. Only a small number were built.

== Developments ==
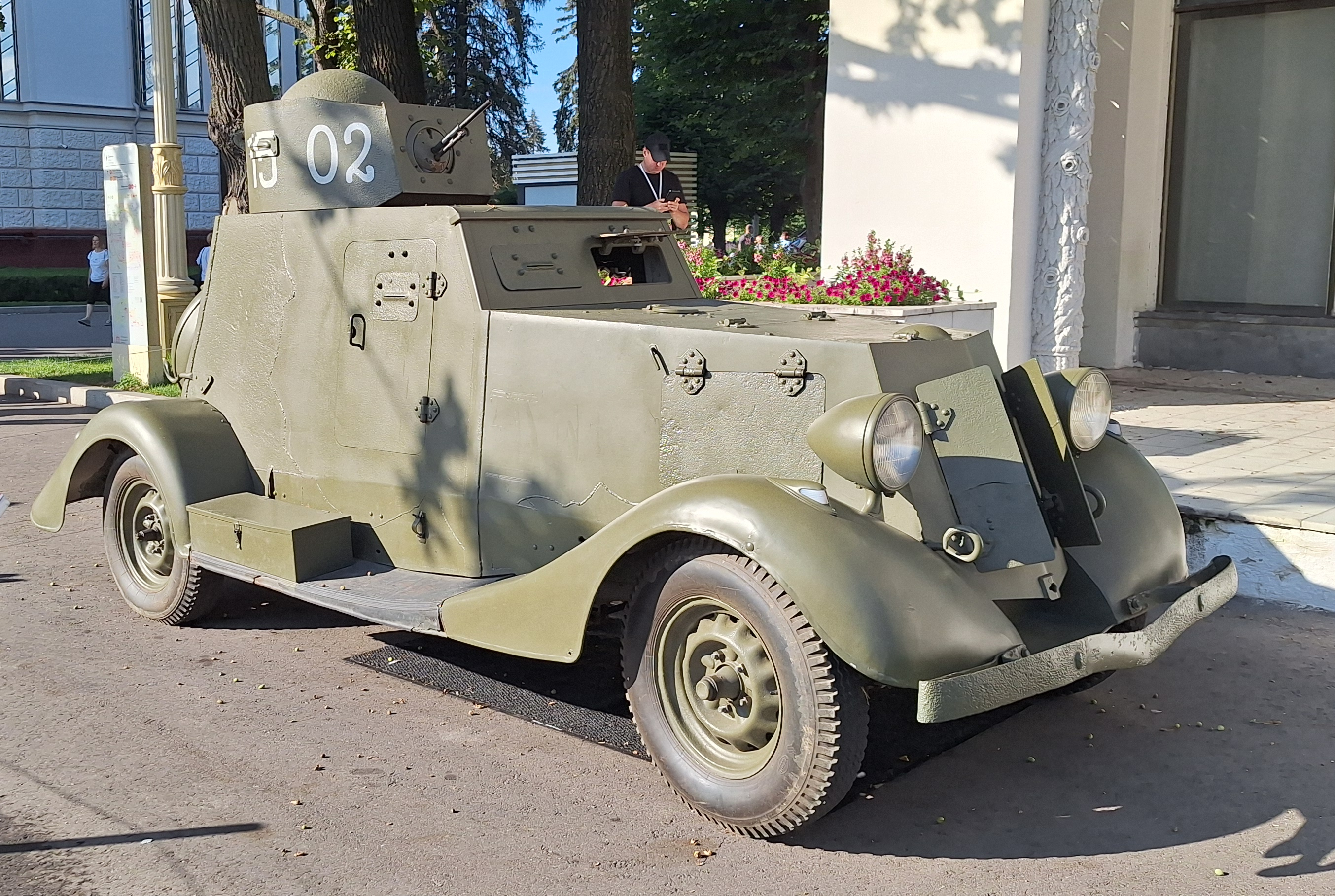
The BA-20, after which the BA-30s fully welded hull was designed

Developed at the NATI Institute, it was hoped that the BA-30 would be an improvement on the off-road performance of the previous BA series and was based on the chassis of the NATI-3 half-tracked transporter, whereas its armored hull was fully welded like the BA-20.

The tracks on the BA-30 used 4 small and two large wheels, along with one return roller which was also incorporated on the NATI-3 and GAZ-60. When used in snowy environments two skis could be added to the front wheels. The BA-30 was noted for having good performance over varying terrains.

It was fitted with a 71-TK-1 radio with its antenna on the hull, armed with a 7.62 DT machine gun, while the vehicle needed manning by a crew of three.

== Unapproved ==
Only a few BA-30s were built and tested, with some taking part in the Winter War of 1939 between the Soviet Union and Finland. However this armored car was not approved for mass production as it was felt to be too heavy compared to other lightly armored cars.
