= Type 1 Ho-Ha =

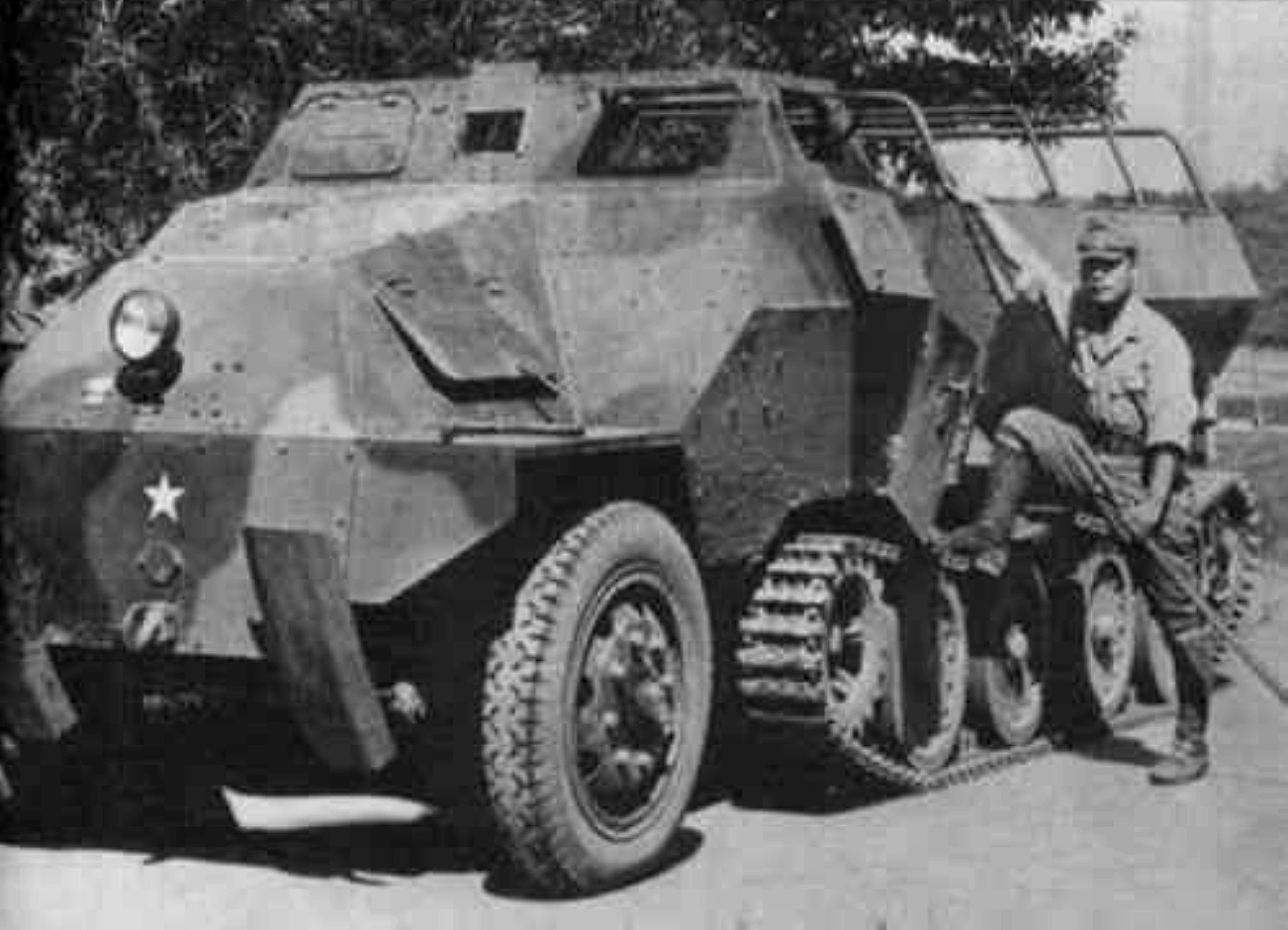
- Type 1 Ho-Ha
- Type: half-track armoured personnel carrier
- Place of origin: Empire of Japan

Service history
- Wars: World War II

Production history
- Designed: 1941
- Manufacturer: Hino Motors
- Produced: 1944–?
- No. built: 150-300 (estimated)

Specifications (Type 1 Ho-Ha)
- Mass: 6.5 tonnes (7.2 tons)
- Length: 6.1 m (20 ft 0 in)
- Width: 2.1 m (6 ft 11 in)
- Height: 2.51 m (8 ft 3 in)
- Crew: 2 + 13 passengers
- Armor: max 8 mm
- Main armament: 3 × 7.7 mm Type 97 light machine guns
- Engine: diesel 134 PS (99 kW) at 2,000 rpm
- Operational range: 300 km (190 mi)
- Maximum speed: 50 km/h (31 mph)

The Type 1 Ho-Ha (一式半装軌装甲兵車 ホハ, Ichi-shiki han-sōki sōkō-heisha hoha) was a half-track armoured personnel carrier (APC) used in limited numbers by the Imperial Japanese Army (IJA) during World War II.

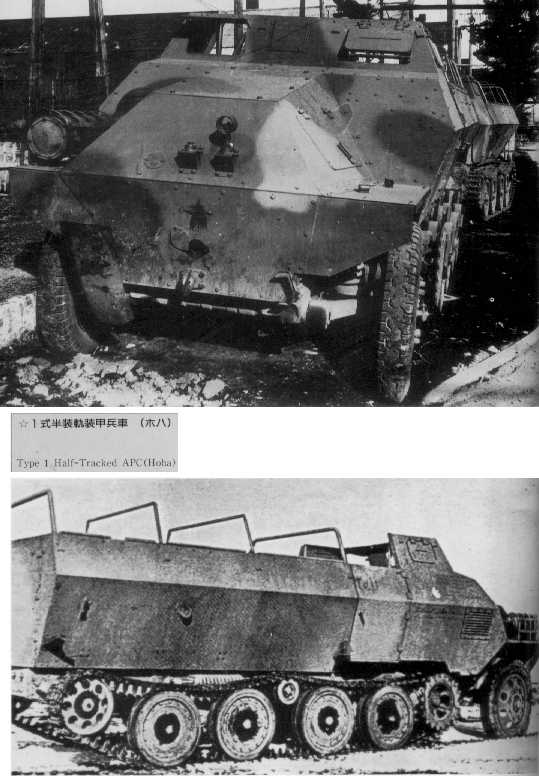
Front and side view of Type 1 Ho-Ha

== Development and history ==
The Type 1 Ho-Ha was developed in 1941 as a result of a request from the army for a vehicle that could be used to transport a squad of infantry to the battlefield protected from enemy small arms fire. Despite experiences of the Second Sino-Japanese War, armored personnel carriers were viewed as too slow compared to wheeled trucks and there was not much effort for their development in the army.

Mass production began in 1944 with the Type 1 Ho-Ha being an addition to the Type 1 Ho-Ki, an unrelated, yet similarly named armored tracked personnel carrier. The half-tracked Type 1 Ho-Ha was built by Hino Motors. An exact total number of units completed is unknown.

== Design ==
The Type 1 Ho-Ha was based on the German Sd.Kfz. 251/1 (known popularly as Hanomag), the main armoured personnel carrier of the German Army, but did not use the overlapped and interleaved road wheels of the German design's suspension. Further, it had a "vertical rear plate with a door", akin to the American M3 half-track; however, the door itself was a copy of the German "two-leaf" design.

The Type 1 Ho-Ha had a pair of road wheels in front, supported by a pair of short caterpillar tracks to the rear. It was equipped with a tow coupling in the front and a towing hitch at the rear to haul artillery or a supply trailer. The maximum armor thickness was 8 mm with sloping armor plates. As with the Type 1 Ho-Ki, the hull was welded construction and it was "open-topped".

The Type 1 Ho-Ha carried three Type 97 light machine guns as standard armament, one on each side, just to the rear of the driver's compartment and a third mounted to the rear as an anti-aircraft weapon. All of these weapons had constricted firing arcs, which made firing directly forward or directly rearward impossible.

== Combat record and post-war ==
The Type 1 Ho-Ha was initially deployed to China for operations in the ongoing Second Sino-Japanese War, but never in any great numbers. It was later deployed with the Japanese reinforcements in the Battle of the Philippines in 1944. Post-war, some Type 1 Ho-Ha half-tracks were modified by cutting off the rear armored section and replacing it with a flat bed. They were then used for reconstruction work in areas of Japan.
