= Linn tractor =

American tractor

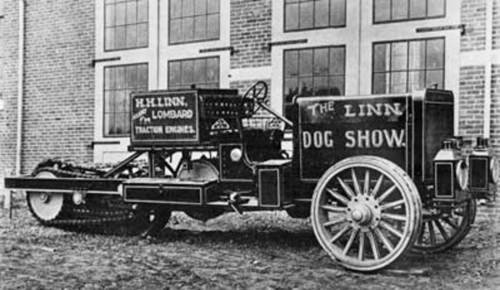
Alvin Lombard of Waterville tractor

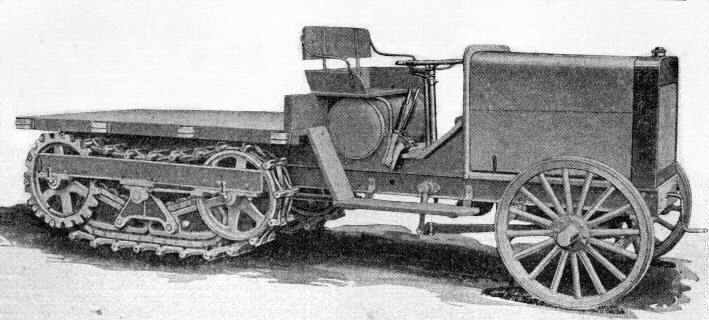
First Linn tractor, 1916

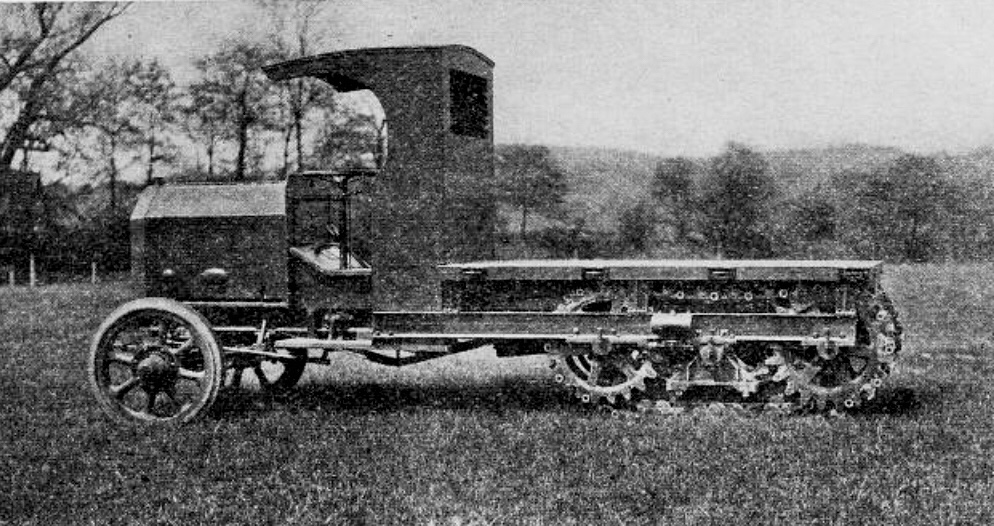
Linn 5734 cc Continental engine (1919)

The Linn tractor is a heavy duty civilian half-track or crawler tractor invented by Holman Harry Linn (born Holman Harry Flannery). Approximately 2,500 units were built in Morris, New York, USA from 1916 to 1952.

== Development ==
=== Prototypes ===
Linn was a native of Maine and in his quest for a better machine to travel rural roads with his dog and pony show equipment gave up on a six-wheel-drive design by 1907 to have Alvin Lombard, of Waterville, build a machine using the tracks off a Lombard Steam Log Hauler, and underslung gasoline engine and wheels on front. It was equipped with a ship-style cabin with living quarters and able to pull a string of wagons behind as well as supply electric lights for his circus. By 1909 this was replaced because of size with a single rear-tracked machine with standard wheeled front axle; however as Linn had become employed as a salesman, demonstrator and mechanic for Lombard a patent dispute erupted and Linn left Maine with his show.

Linn's tractors were clearly inspired by Lombard's, but Lombard preferred a rigid track whereas Linn used flexible track. Since neither inventor had patented the overall concept, just the track system, there was no copyright infringement to prevent Linn from continuing to build his version of the tractors.

=== Improved traction system ===
By 1916 Linn had developed an even smaller, more stable gasoline-powered half-track with an improved flexible traction system, independent of each other, with a central triangle-shaped rocker using two tear-dropped runner blocks suspended by axles, then surrounded by an independent roller chain to disperse the load through these rollers, patented in 1918. The feature being with constant ground following traction, and steering accomplished by front wheels (or sled in winter); full power was supplied to both tracks all the time and transmitted to the ground so there was no loss of tractive effort when turning. Lombard and most other crawlers used a rigid bed inside the tracks which would be lifted off the ground at times, and track-steer crawlers reduce power through clutch or brake action to their tracks to turn, losing additional tractive effort. With its payload carrying ability, the Linn did not require trailers or wagons to move a load, something which off-road terrain does not always permit, and no dead weight or ballast was needed for traction, as simply more payload could be added.

== Applications ==
Linn tractors were used to haul freight beyond the ends of the rail lines on some Canadian power projects. When the concept of rural snow plowing became accepted around 1920, Linn was one of the pioneers, with a v-plow and adjusting leveling wing design that was unmatched until better pneumatic tires, four-wheel-drive trucks and better highways appeared in the mid-1930s to plow highways on a more frequent basis. To combat this a new concept of a single machine able to switch from truck to tractor with the push of a lever appeared in 1938, known as the C5 or later trademarked term "CATRUK", but management and war priorities limited its development and it was abandoned after World War II. This machine was built in a cab-over configuration, front wheel drive, and a hydraulically lowered dual-wheeled tag-axle that would push the tracks up off the ground. "HAFTRAK" is another Linn trademark.

In the 15 February, 1920 issue of Motor West, Linn tractors as being used by B.H. Baird described them as being powered by a 45 hp Continental Motors Company Red Seal engine connected to a four speed model 60 Brown-Lipe-Chapin transmission & differential, with the normal load being 16 tons over an 8% grade and a maximum speed of 6 mph.
