= Half-track =

Land vehicle with both regular wheels and continuous tracks

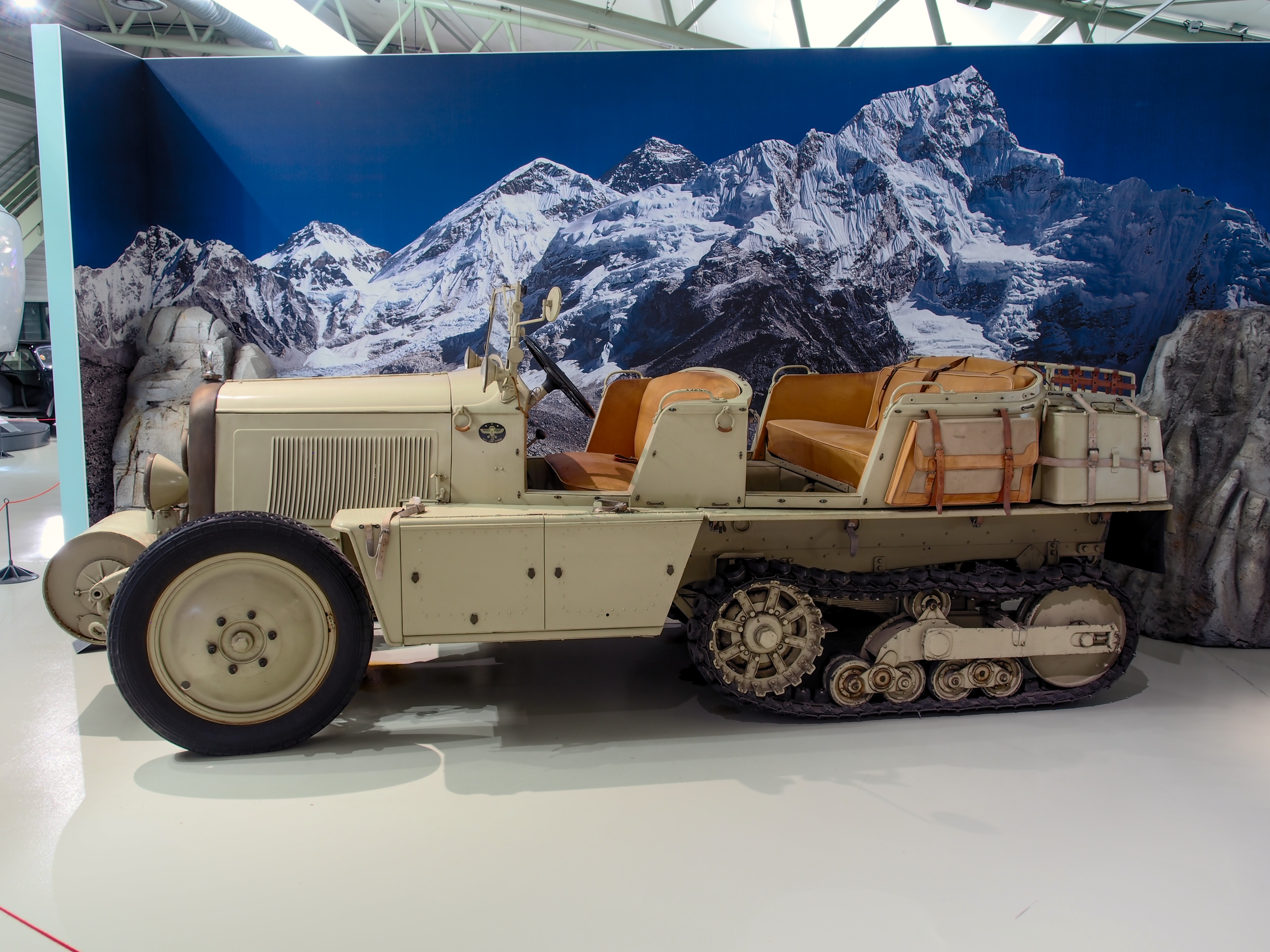
Citroën P17 half-track truck of the early 1930s

A half-track is a civilian or military vehicle with wheels at the front for steering and continuous tracks at the back to propel the vehicle and carry most of the load. A half-track combines the soft-ground traction of a tank with the handling of a wheeled vehicle.

== Performance ==
The main advantage of a half-track over a fully-wheeled vehicle is that its tracks reduce the pressure on any given area of the ground by spreading the vehicle's weight over a larger area, giving it greater mobility over soft terrain like mud and snow. A further advantage is that it does not require either the complex steering mechanism of a fully tracked vehicle or skill in tracked steering, relying instead on a familiar steering wheel connected to its front wheels to direct the vehicle; maneuverability is augmented in some cases by track braking tied to the steering wheel.

The main disadvantage is the increased maintenance to maintain track tension, and the reduced life span of tracks (up to 10,000 km) compared to tires (up to 50,000 km).

== History ==
=== Kégresse track ===
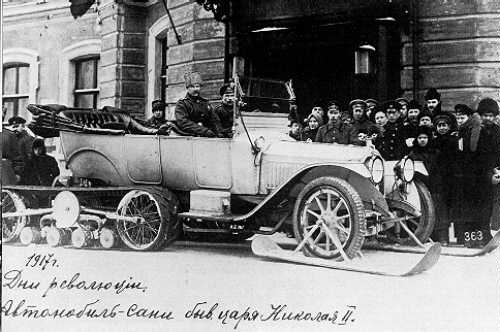
A car from Tsar Nicholas II of Russia's personal car pool converted with Kégresse tracks

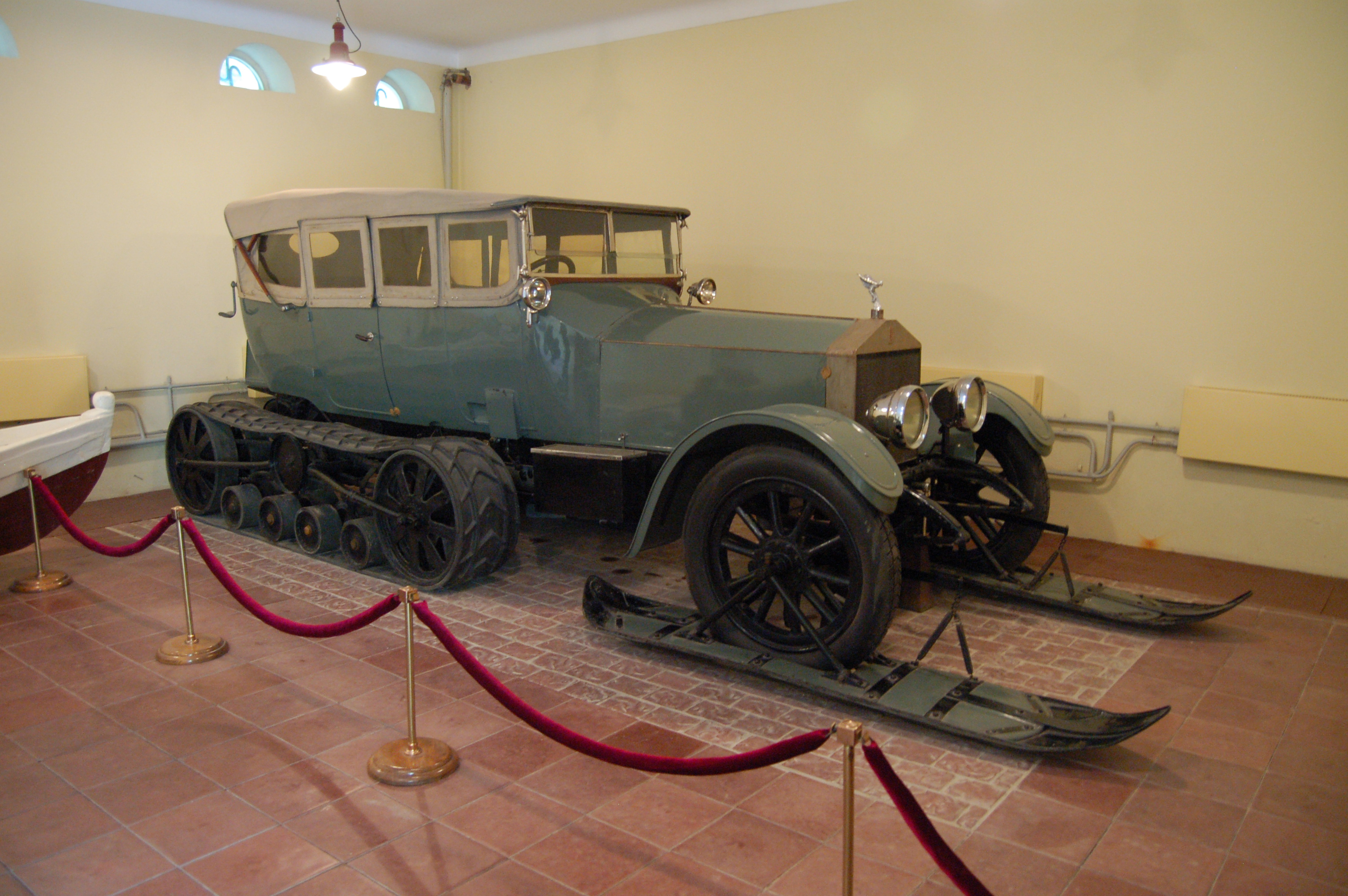
Vladimir Lenin's Rolls-Royce Silver Ghost with Kégresse track, converted by the Putilov Plant), at Gorki Leninskiye

The French engineer Adolphe Kégresse converted a number of cars from the personal car pool of Tsar Nicholas II of Russia to half-tracks in 1911. The Kégresse track used a flexible belt rather than interlocking metal segments. It was applied to several vehicles in the imperial garage, including Rolls-Royce cars and Packard trucks. The Imperial Russian Army also fitted the system to a number of its Austin Armoured Cars. From 1916 onward, Austin-Putilov model military half-tracks were produced along the same lines at the Putilov Plant using trucks and French track parts.

After the Russian Revolution and the establishment of the Soviet Union, Kégresse returned to his native France, where the system was used on Citroën cars between 1921 and 1937 for off-road and military vehicles.

=== Steam log hauler ===
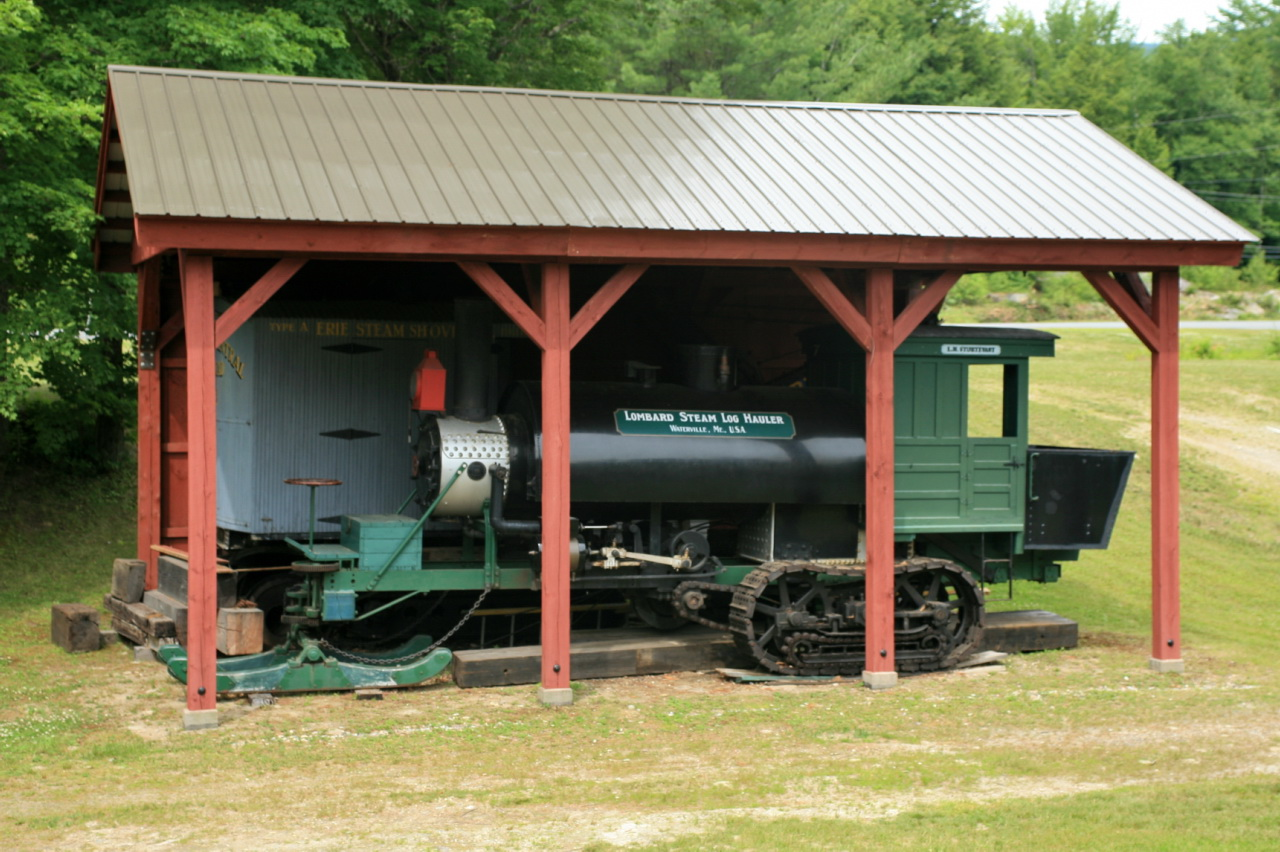
A restored Lombard steam log hauler in New Hampshire, US, in 2008

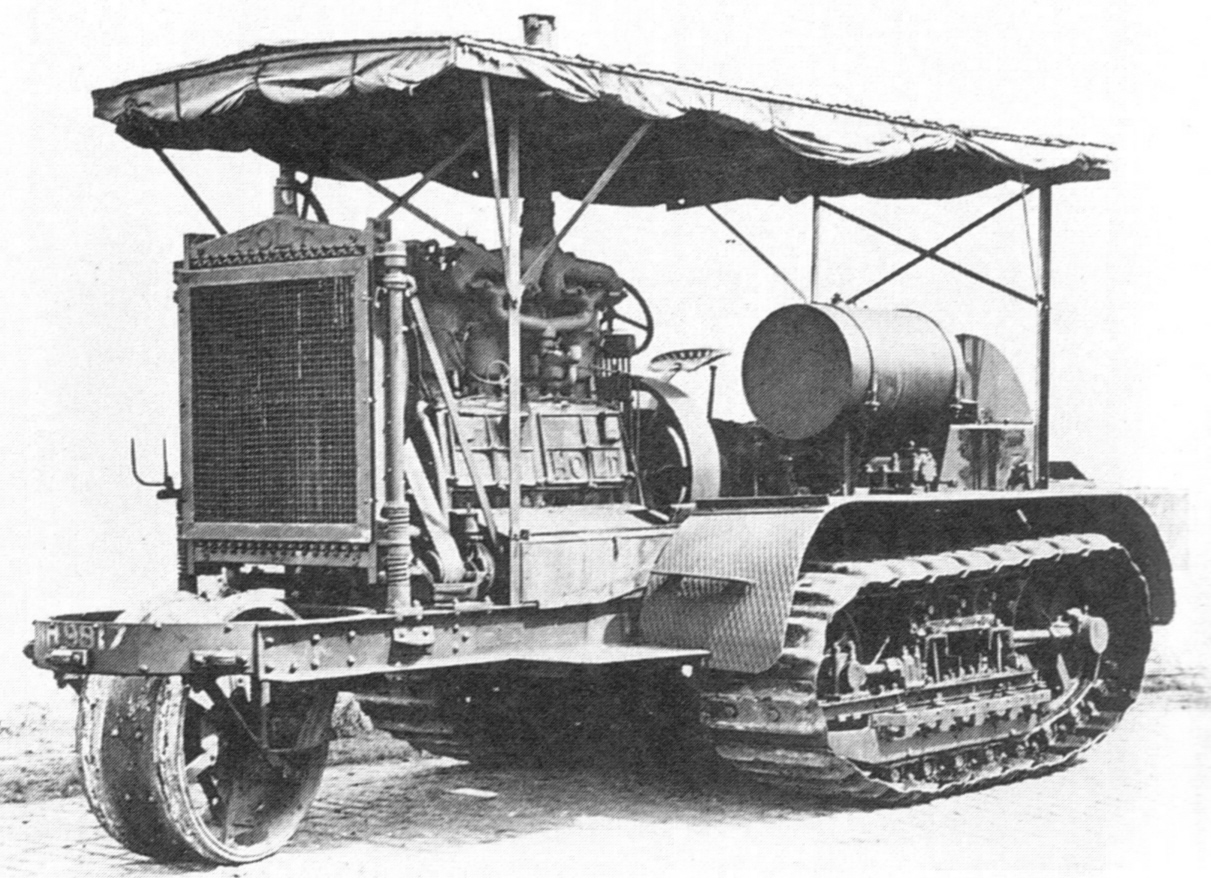
The Holt 75 model gasoline-powered Caterpillar tractor. Later models were produced without the front "tiller wheel".

The concept originated with log hauling in the northeastern US, with the Lombard Steam Log Hauler built by Alvin Lombard of Waterville, Maine, from 1899 to 1917. The vehicle resembled a railway steam locomotive, with sled steering (or wheels) in front and chain-driven rear tracked rear crawlers driven by chains instead of the driving wheels of a locomotive.

By 1907, dog and pony show operator H. H. Linn abandoned his gas-and-steam-powered four- and six-wheel-drive creations and had Lombard build a motor home/traction engine run by an underslung four-cylinder Brennan gasoline engine to travel the unimproved roads of the day, with wheels at the front and tracks at the rear: the first payload-carrying half-track. By 1909 this was replaced by a smaller machine with two wheels at the front and a single track behind, since rural wooden bridges presented problems.

Stability issues, together with a dispute between Linn and Lombard, led Linn to create the Linn Manufacturing Company, builder of the Linn tractor, for building and putting onto the market his own improved civilian half-track–style machines. Lombard attempted to follow but, for the most part, remained a pulling machine. Linn would later register "Haftrak" and "Catruk" as trademarks, the latter for a half-track meant to convert hydraulically from truck to crawler configuration.

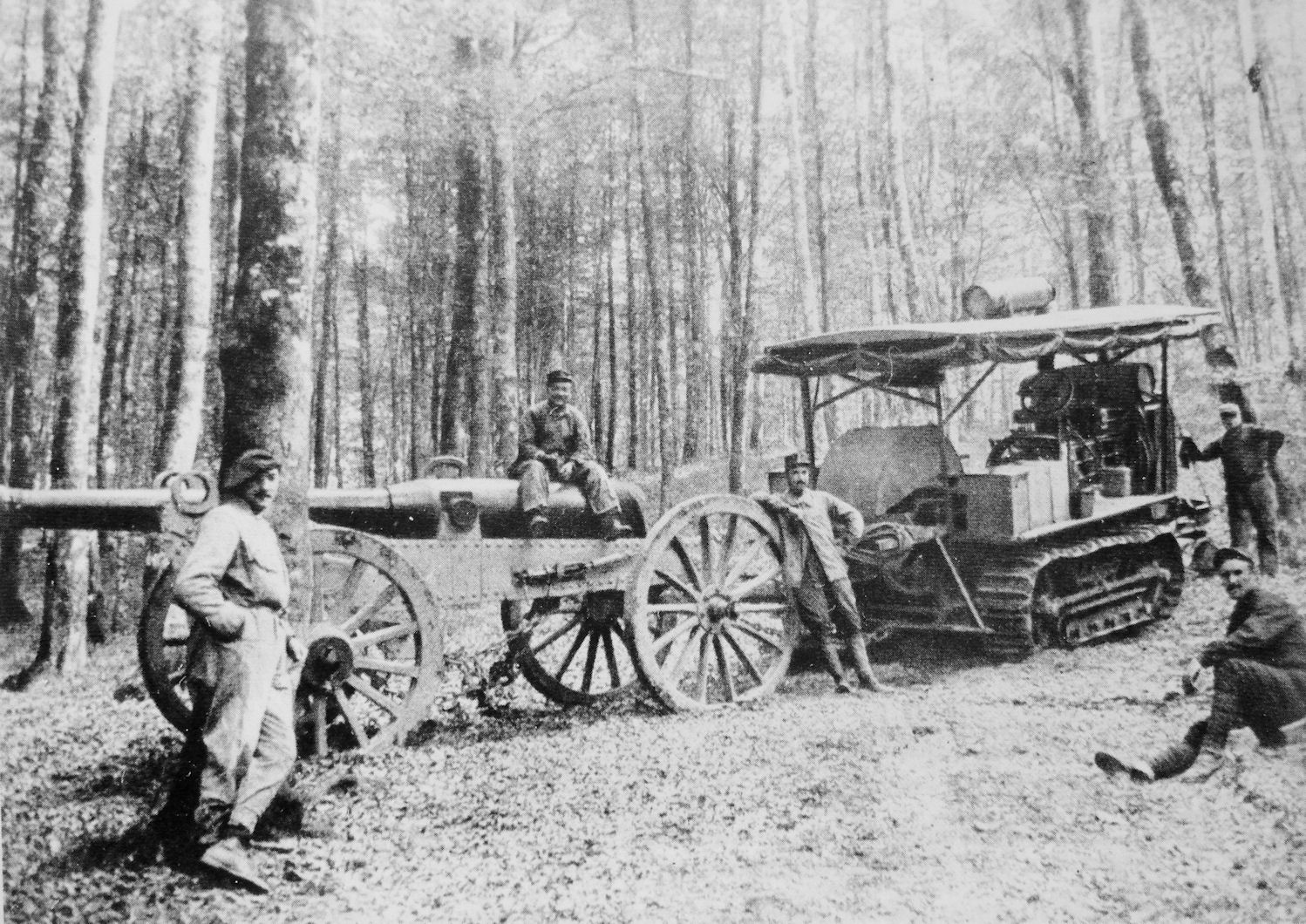
Artillery tractors (here a Holt tractor) used by the French Army in 1914-1915

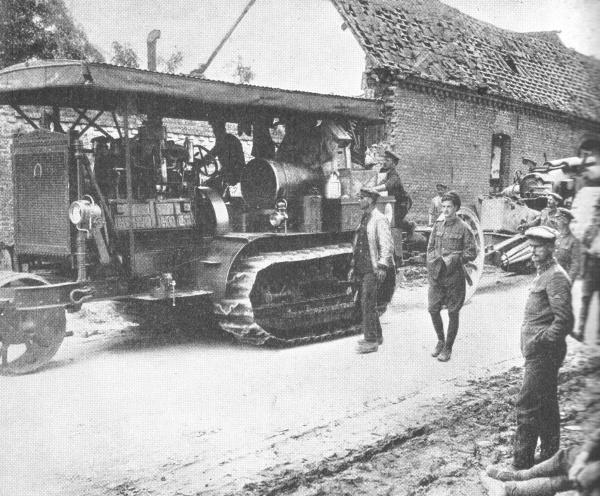
A Holt tractor towing artillery through a French village in 1916

=== World War I ===
Tractors used to tow artillery and designs with front wheels and tracks at the rear began to appear prior to the outbreak of war, often based on agricultural machines such as the Holt tractor. The basic half-track concept was originally showcased by the British during the war.

With such tractors, the tactical use of heavier guns to supplement the light horse-drawn field guns became feasible. For example, in the British Army it allowed the heavy guns of the Royal Garrison Artillery to be used flexibly on the battlefield. In England, starting in 1905, David Roberts of Richard Hornsby & Sons had attempted to interest British military officials in a tracked vehicle, but failed.

Holt bought the patents related to the "chain track" track-type tractor from Richard Hornsby & Sons in 1914 for £4,000. Unlike the Holt tractor, which had a steerable tiller wheel in front of the tracks, the Hornsby crawler was steered by controlling power to each track.

When World War I broke out, with the problem of trench warfare and the difficulty of transporting supplies to the front, the pulling power of crawling-type tractors drew the attention of the military. With tanks coming onto the scene, however, the combination of tracks and wheels seemed impractical when fully tracked or six-wheel, four-wheel drive vehicles were available.

The half-track saw a comeback in the 1930s, with development occurring in several countries that would use them in World War II. The White Motor Company, which had designed armored cars for the United States Army and United States Marines, continued after the First World War to develop armored cars and added tracks for the M2 half-track car and M3 half-track.

=== Autochenille and autoneige ===
There were many civilian half-track experiments in the 1920s and 1930s. The Citroën company sponsored several scientific expeditions crossing deserts in North Africa and Central Asia, using their autochenilles. After World War I, the US military wanted to develop a semi-tracked personnel carrier vehicle, so it looked at these civilian half-tracks. In the late 1920s the US Army purchased several Citroën-Kégresse vehicles for evaluation followed by a licence to produce them. This resulted in the Army Ordnance Department building a prototype in 1939. In September 1940 it went into production with the military M2 and M3 half-track versions.

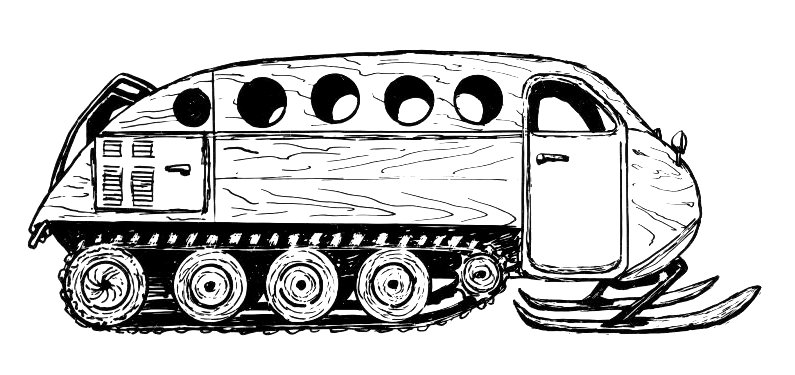
Bombardier

With the snow and ice of Canada in mind, Joseph-Armand Bombardier developed 7- and 12-passenger half-track autoneiges in the 1930s, starting what would become the Bombardier industrial conglomerate. The Bombardier vehicle had tracks for propulsion in the rear and skis for steering in front. The skis could be replaced with wheels in the summer, but this was uncommon.

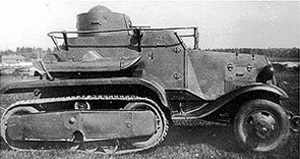
BA-30 armored car

The Red Army also experimented with half-tracks, such as the BA-30, but found them expensive and unreliable. Although not a feature on American World War II vehicles, steering could be assisted by track braking, controlled by the steering wheel.

=== World War II half-track production ===
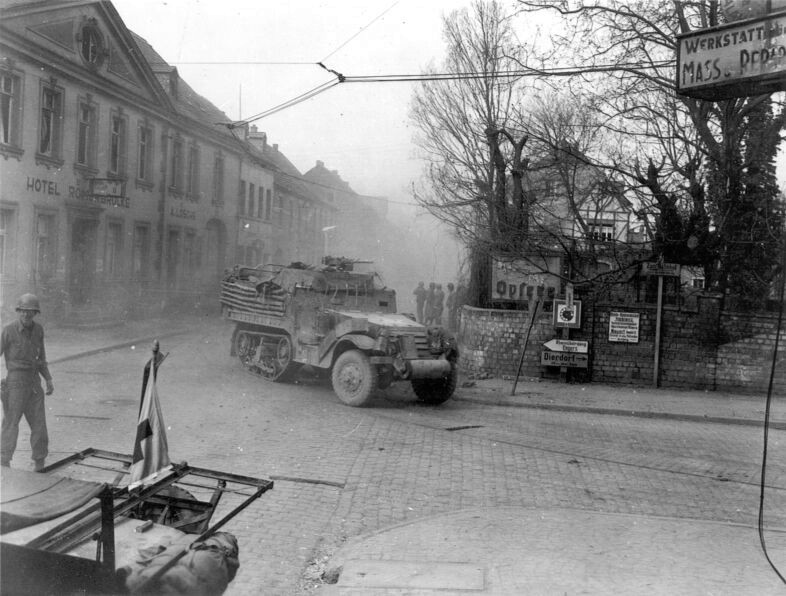
US 9th Armored Division halftracks advancing through Engers, Germany, March 27, 1945

In the US, 56,000 halftracks were produced by four primary manufacturers, the largest being the White Motor Company, the original designer, with a total of 15,414 accepted by the War Department. Two other manufacturers, Autocar and Diamond T, built 12,168 and 12,421, respectively.

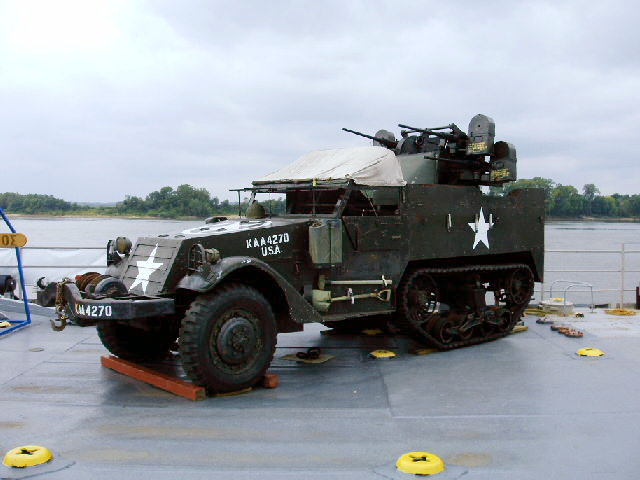
M16 .50 AA Quad on an M3 half-track

The fourth manufacturer of American-made half-tracks was the International Motor Truck Corporation division of International Harvester. IH built approximately 12,853 half-tracks at its Springfield Works, which were shipped to Europe for use by British and French troops. In 1942, it produced 152 M5 units and 5 M14 units; in 1943, 2,026 M9 units, 1,407 M0A1 units, 4,473 M5 units, 1,600 M14 units, and 400 M17 units; in 1944, 1,100 M5A1 units and 1,100 M17 units also at the Springfield Works; and in 1945 589 M5A1 and 1 M5A3 units.

The IHC half-tracks differed visibly from the White, Diamond T, and AutoCar units in several ways. The IHC units had flat front fenders instead of fenders with compound curves; used the International Red Diamond 450 engines instead of the Hercules 160AX; used IHC Model 1856 4-speed transmissions instead of the Spicer 4-speed transmissions; had IHC Model FOK-1370 front drive axles instead of the Timken; used IHC Model RHT-1590 axles in the rear instead of the Timken; and were constructed with fully welded armor with rounded rear corners instead of the bolted armor with square corners.

These designs were also produced under license in Canada, and were widely supplied under the Lend Lease program, with 5,000 supplied to the USSR alone.

=== World War II half-track use ===
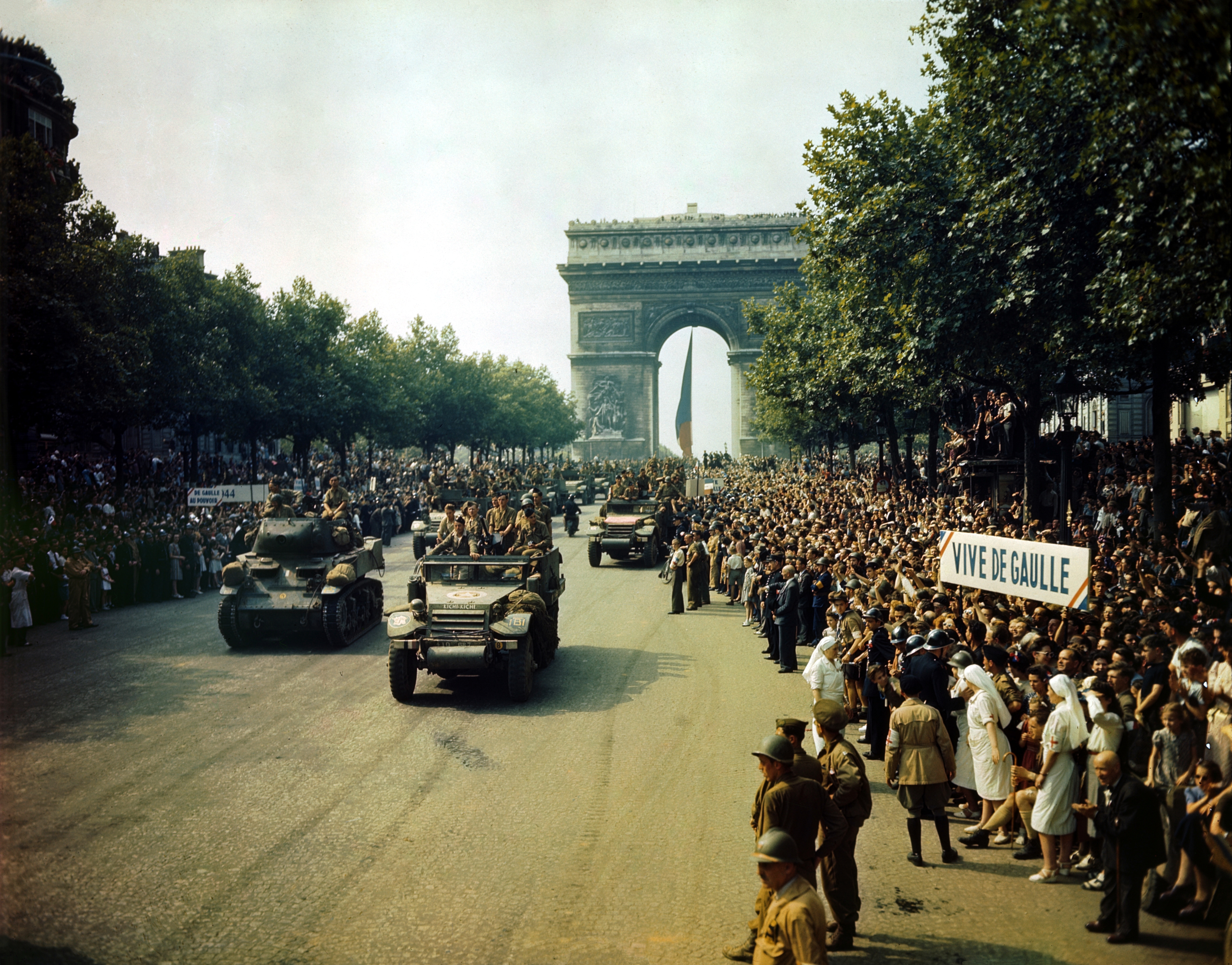
Allied victory parade August 23, 1944, with IH half-tracks

In August 1944, Allied forces liberated Paris. The first vehicle to enter the city was an M3 named "España Cañí" and driven by Spanish soldiers fighting under the French tricolor. There followed several days of parades in late August. One parade of 25 August 1944 was down the Champs-Élysées, with Charles de Gaulle leading throngs of Parisians, and French soldiers driving IH half-tracks.

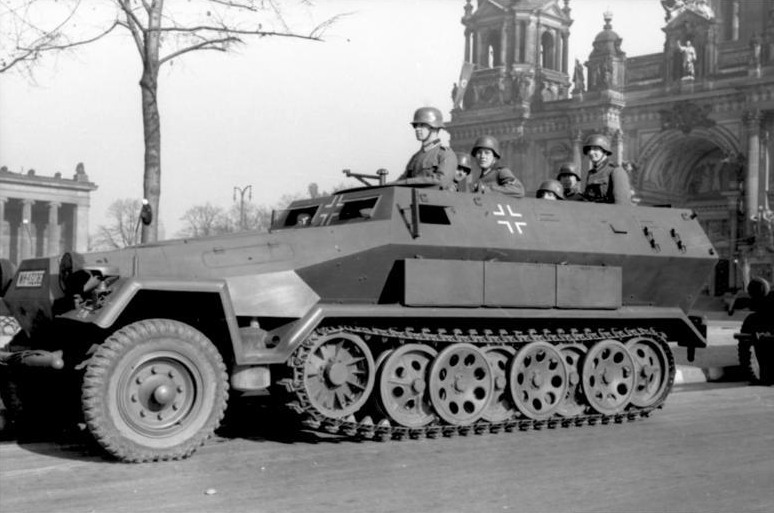
A German Schützenpanzer Sd.Kfz. 251 half-track. Photograph taken in 1940 in Berlin.

==== Infantry transporters ====
Half-tracks were used extensively as infantry transporters in World War II, especially by the Germans with their armored Demag-designed Sd.Kfz. 250s and Hanomag-designed Sd.Kfz. 251s; and by the Americans with their M2s and M3s.

==== Support weapon platforms ====
Half-tracks were widely used as mortar carriers, self-propelled anti-aircraft guns, self-propelled anti-tank guns, armored fighting vehicles and in other tasks.

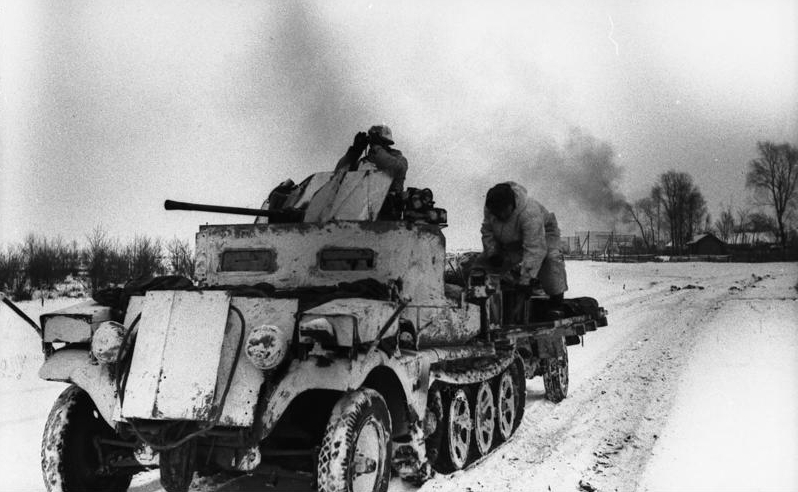
A German Sd.Kfz. 10/4 or 10/5 with Behelfspanzerung

==== Utility and tractor half-tracks ====
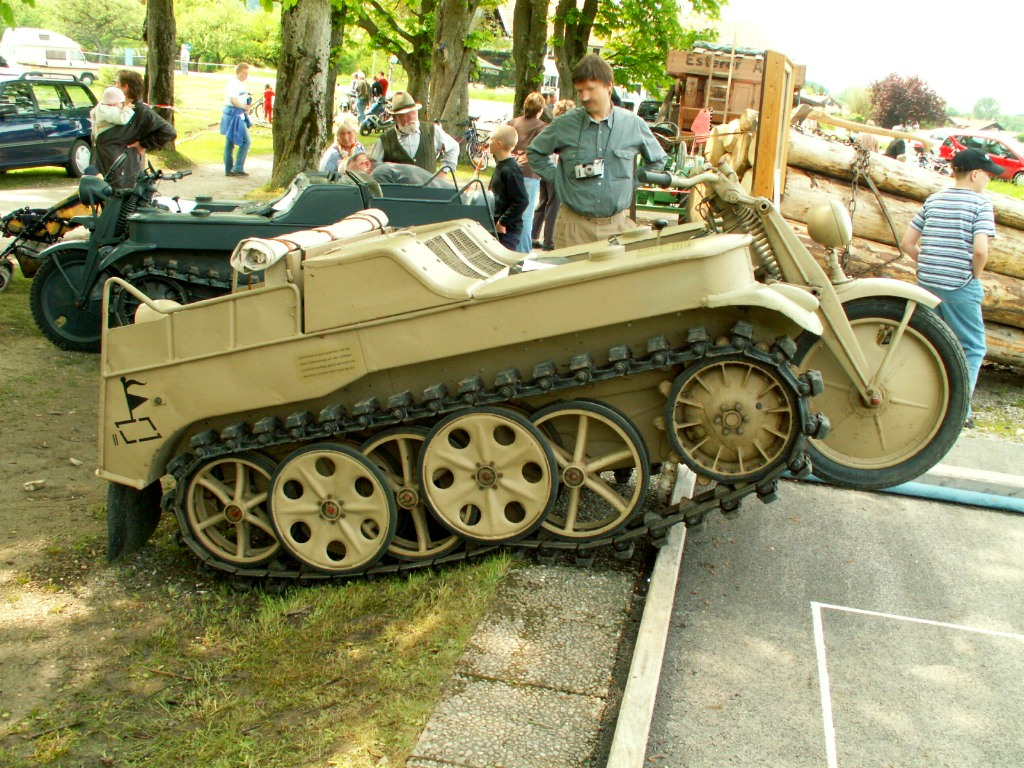
A small Sd.Kfz. 2, with the characteristic Schachtellaufwerk overlapped/interleaved roadwheels

The Germans used a small two-seater 1/2-ton class half-track "motorcycle", the Sd.Kfz. 2 (better known as the Kleines Kettenkraftrad HK 101 or Kettenkrad for short – Ketten meaning tracks, and krad being the military abbreviation of the German word Kraftrad, the administrative German term for motorcycle), to pull small artillery guns, for ammunition haulage, general transport and as a ground towing vehicle for the Messerschmitt Me 262 jet fighter. Built by NSU Motorenwerke AG Neckarsulm and Stoewer Werke Stettin, a total of 8,345 vehicles were produced between 1940 and 1944.

Other Wehrmacht models were:

- 1-ton class, Sd.Kfz. 10 produced by Demag, Berlin; Adler, Frankfurt am Main; Büssing-NAG, Brunswick; Phänomen, Cottbus and Saurer, Vienna, a total of 25,000 vehicles - its drivetrain was used for the Sd.Kfz. 250
- 3-ton class, Sd.Kfz. 11 produced by Hanomag, Adler, Auto-Union and Skoda from 1938 to 1944, a total of 25,000 vehicles - its drivetrain was used for the Sd.Kfz. 251
- 5-ton class. Sd.Kfz. 6, manufactured by Büssing-NAG, Berlin-Oberschönweide; Daimler-Benz and Praga (Czechoslovakia), about 3,500 vehicles in total
- 8-ton class. Sd.Kfz. 7, production was of about 12,000 vehicles
- 12-ton class. Sd.Kfz. 8, some 4,000 vehicles were produced by five manufacturers
- 18-ton class. Sd.Kfz. 9, a production of only 2,000 vehicles

Larger German half-track tractors were used to tow anti-tank and field artillery pieces. The largest of these were also used by mechanical engineers to retrieve bogged down vehicles or perform repairs such as engine maintenance. Maultier half-tracks used to transport supplies to forward units were essentially civilian trucks which had had their rear axles replaced by Panzer I or Panzer II running gear. A replacement half-track design introduced later in World War II, the 1943-introduced Schwerer Wehrmachtschlepper, was meant to replace the 3-tonne and 5-tonne capacity models – only some 825 examples were built before the war's end.

A common feature of virtually all German World War II half-tracks was the so-called Schachtellaufwerk overlapped/interleaved roadwheel arrangement with a "slack track" system possessing no return rollers under the return run of track, used from the small Kettenkrad to the nine-tonne capacity Sd.Kfz. 9 vehicle, and most famously used on Henschel's Tiger I and MAN's Panther main battle tanks.

=== Cold War use ===
Half-tracks were extensively used after World War II until the late 1960s, mostly in form of surplus World War II vehicles. Half-tracks saw combat in the French colonial empire in the First Indochina War and the Algerian War; in the Indo-Pakistani wars and conflicts; and in the early wars of the Arab–Israeli conflict.

Half-tracks continued in use by the Israeli Army where they were deemed to outperform fully tracked and fully wheeled vehicles for non-combat payload tasks such as carrying telecommunications equipment. As of March 2008, 600 half-tracks were still officially listed as on active duty.

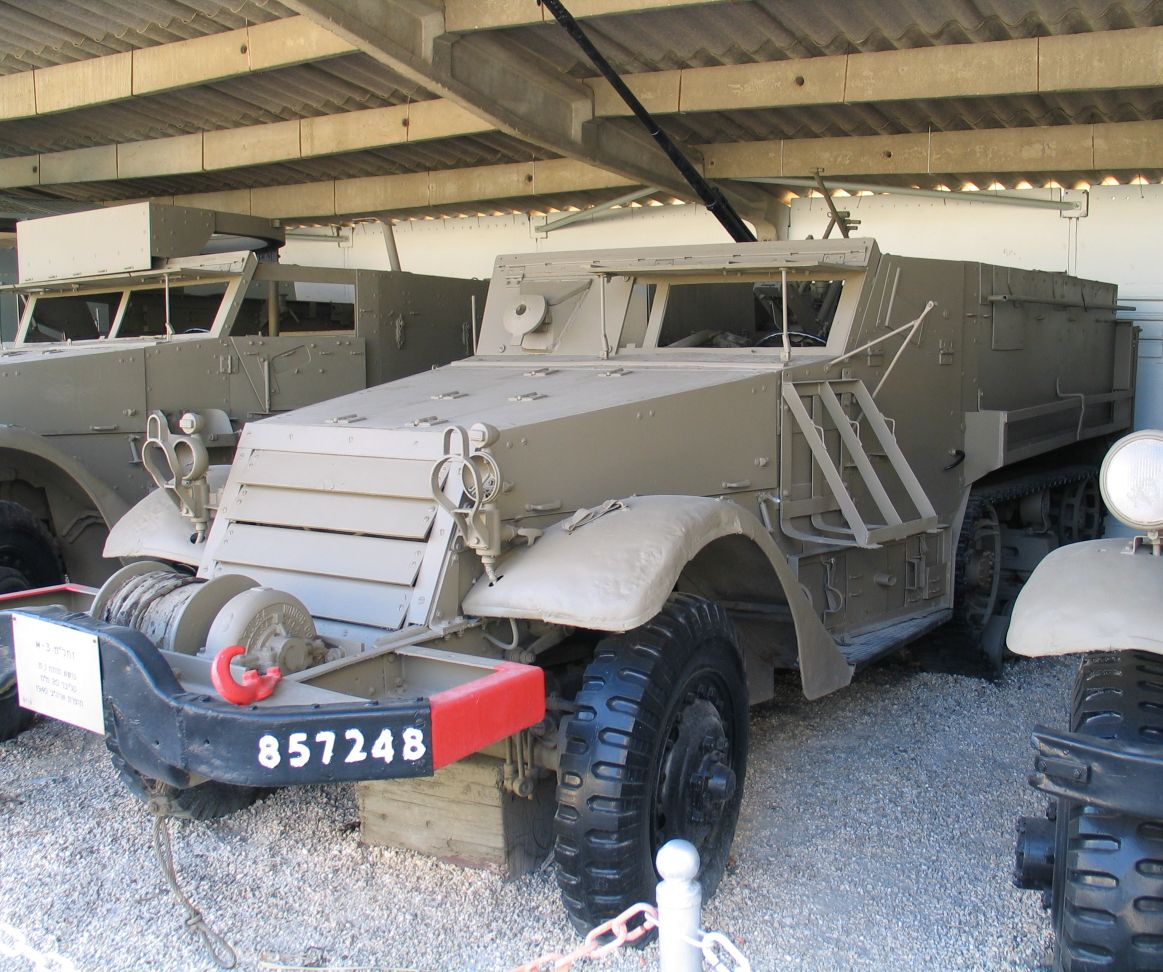
Israeli modified M3 Half-track, armed with 20 mm cannon

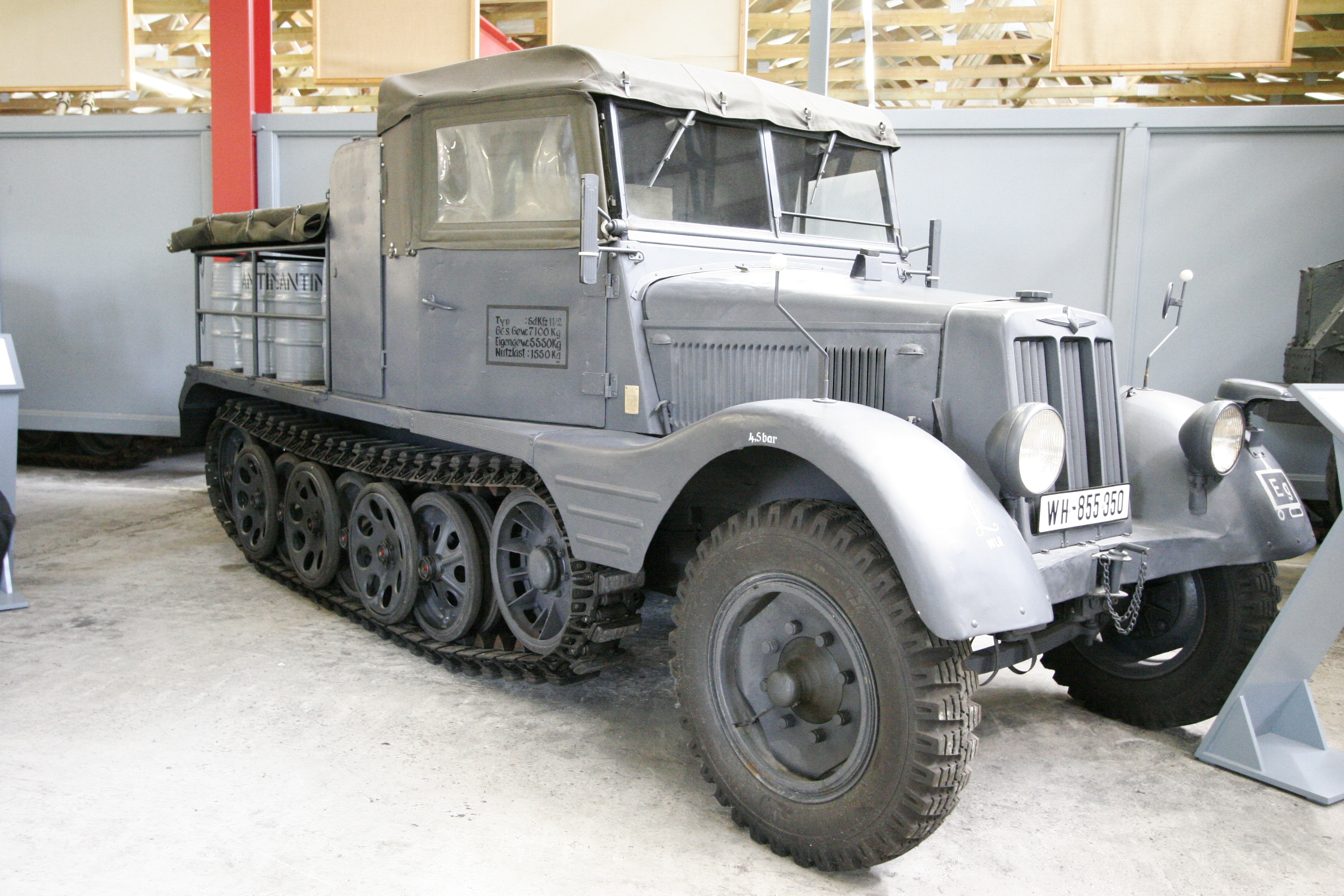
German Sd.Kfz. 11 half-track

== Civilian use ==
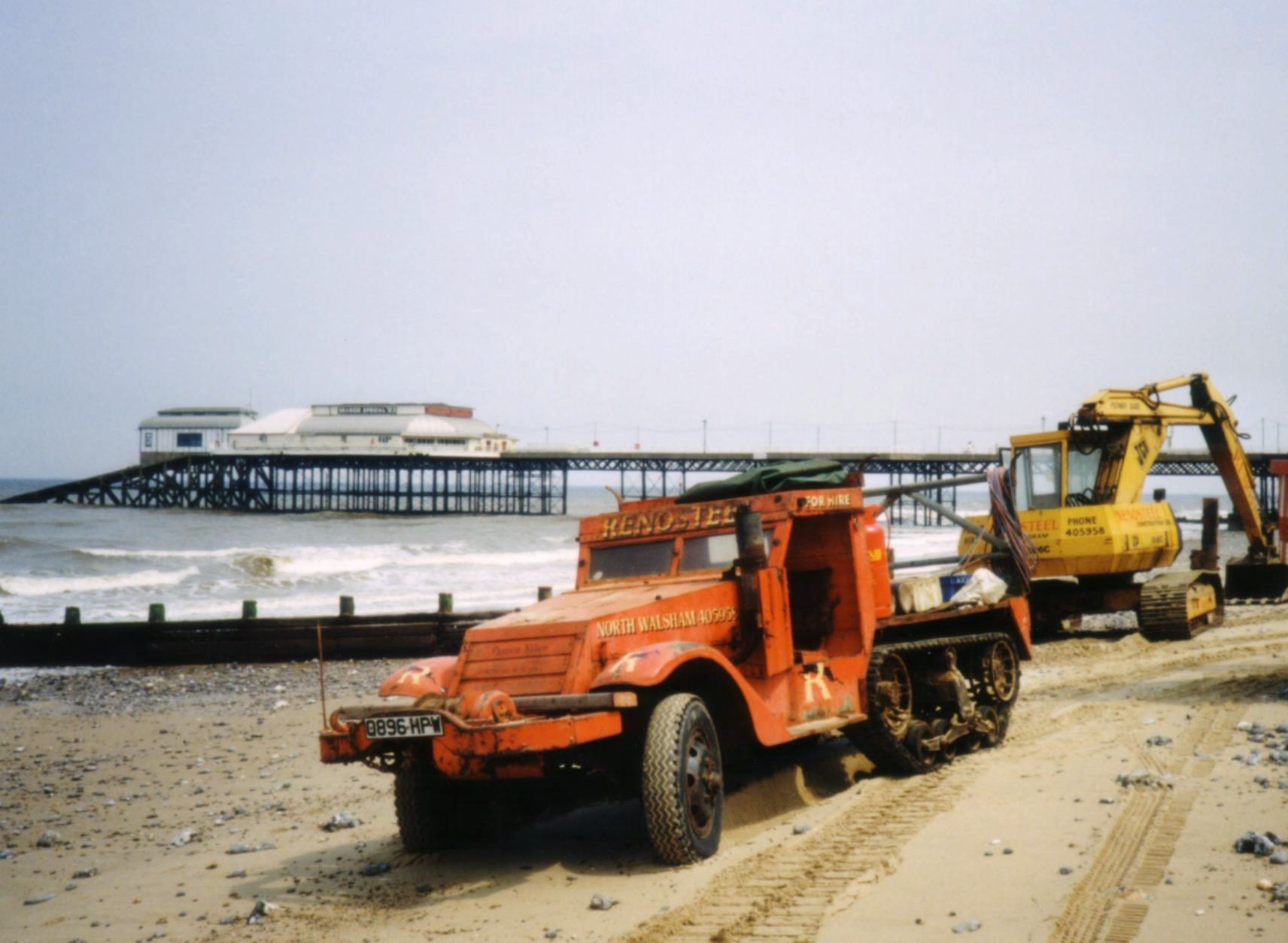
Half-track in use in Norfolk, UK in 1993

Many Second World War half-tracks were sold off to civilian users either as surplus stock or later due to obsolescence when the fully tracked armoured personnel carrier was introduced into service. Most were used in engineering-related tasks involving terrain that would be difficult for even four-wheel drive trucks, such as snow, sand and water-logged soil. Many were significantly modified for their new roles, including being fitted with winches, small cranes, and generators after the rear cabin sides were removed.

Some World War II half-tracks were used as all-terrain fire department pumpers or tankers.

== Gallery ==
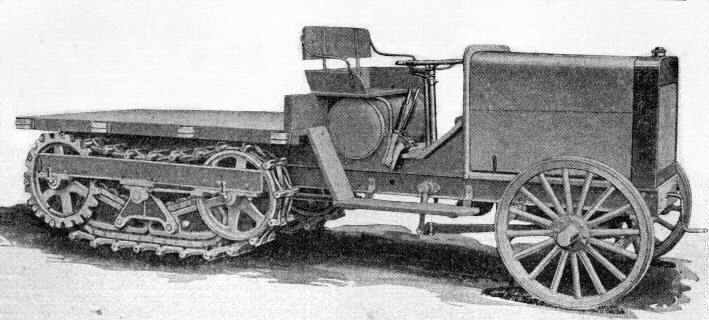
First Linn tractor, 1916

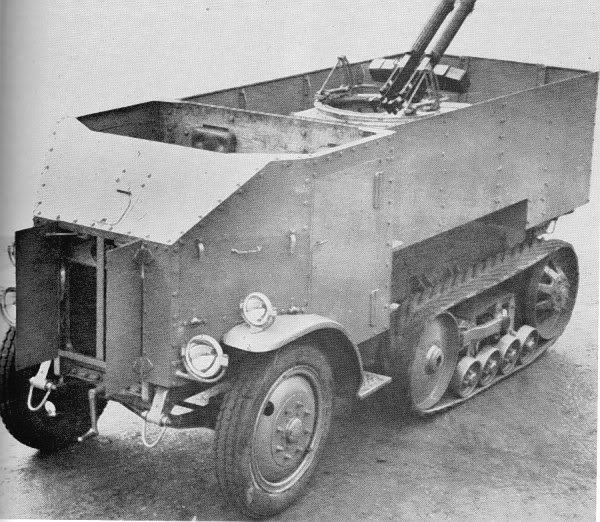
British semi-tracked armoured personnel carrier Kégresse track 30cwt

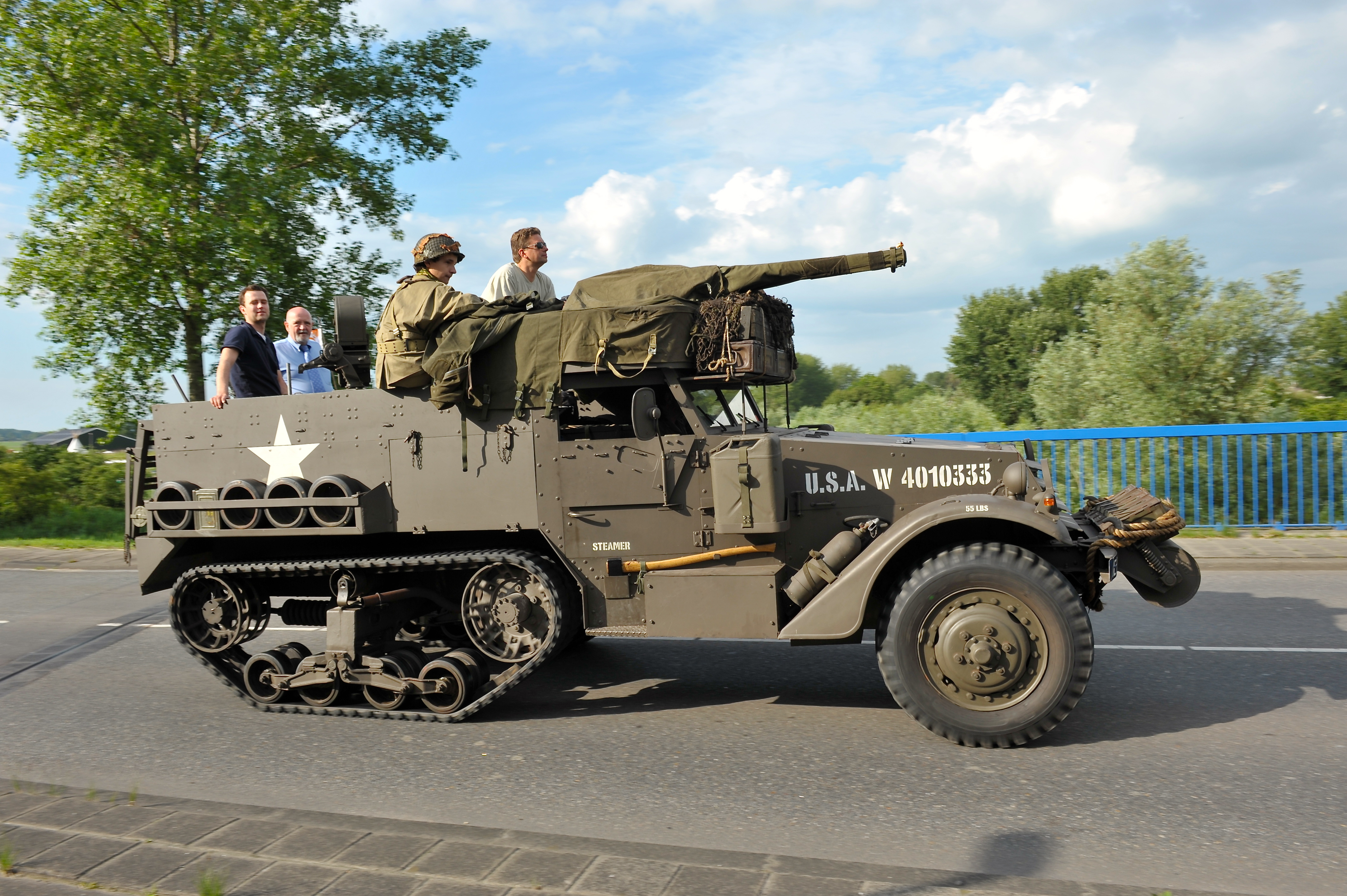
Preserved M9 half-track

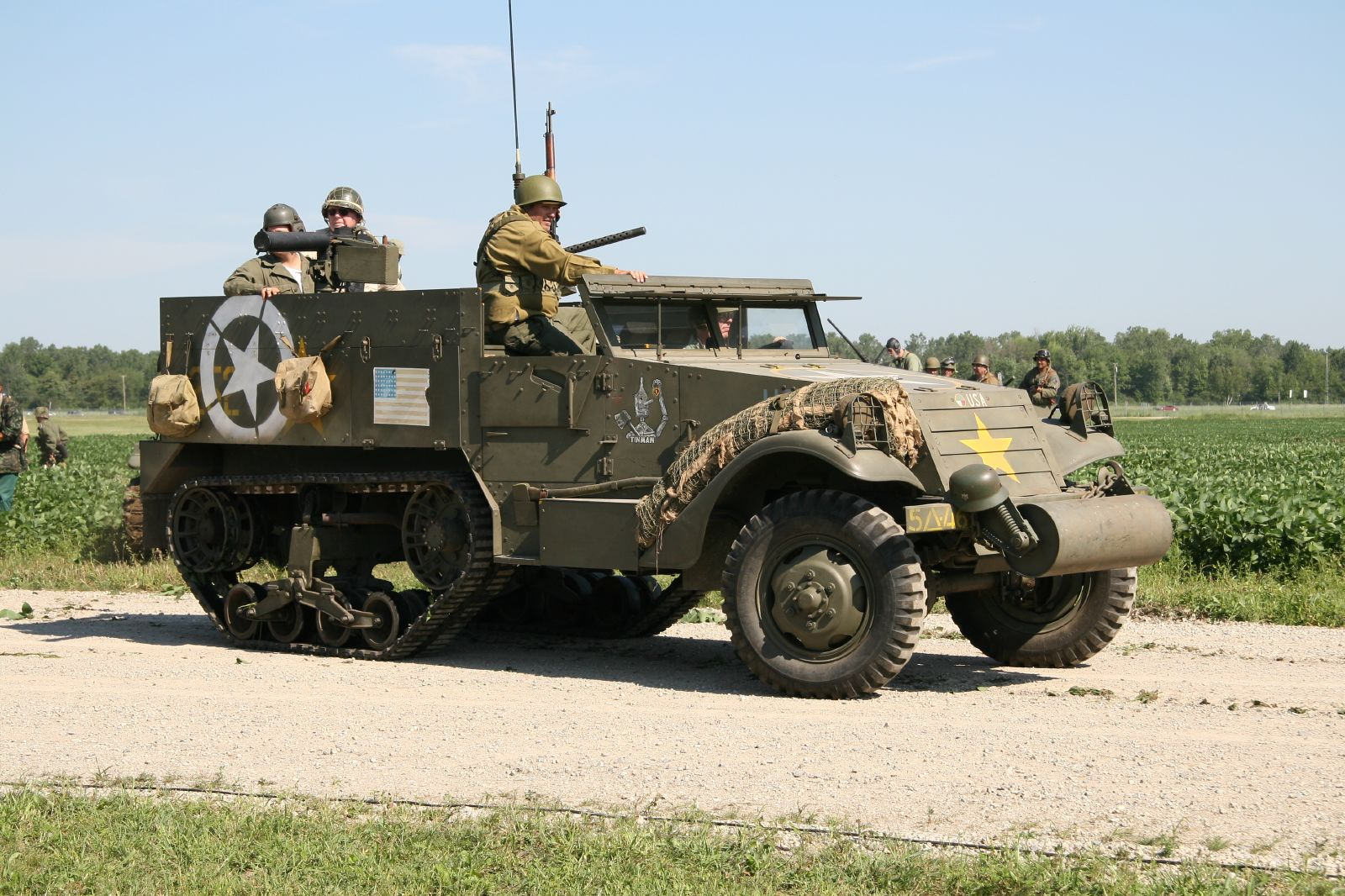
M3 half-track, Thunder Over Michigan

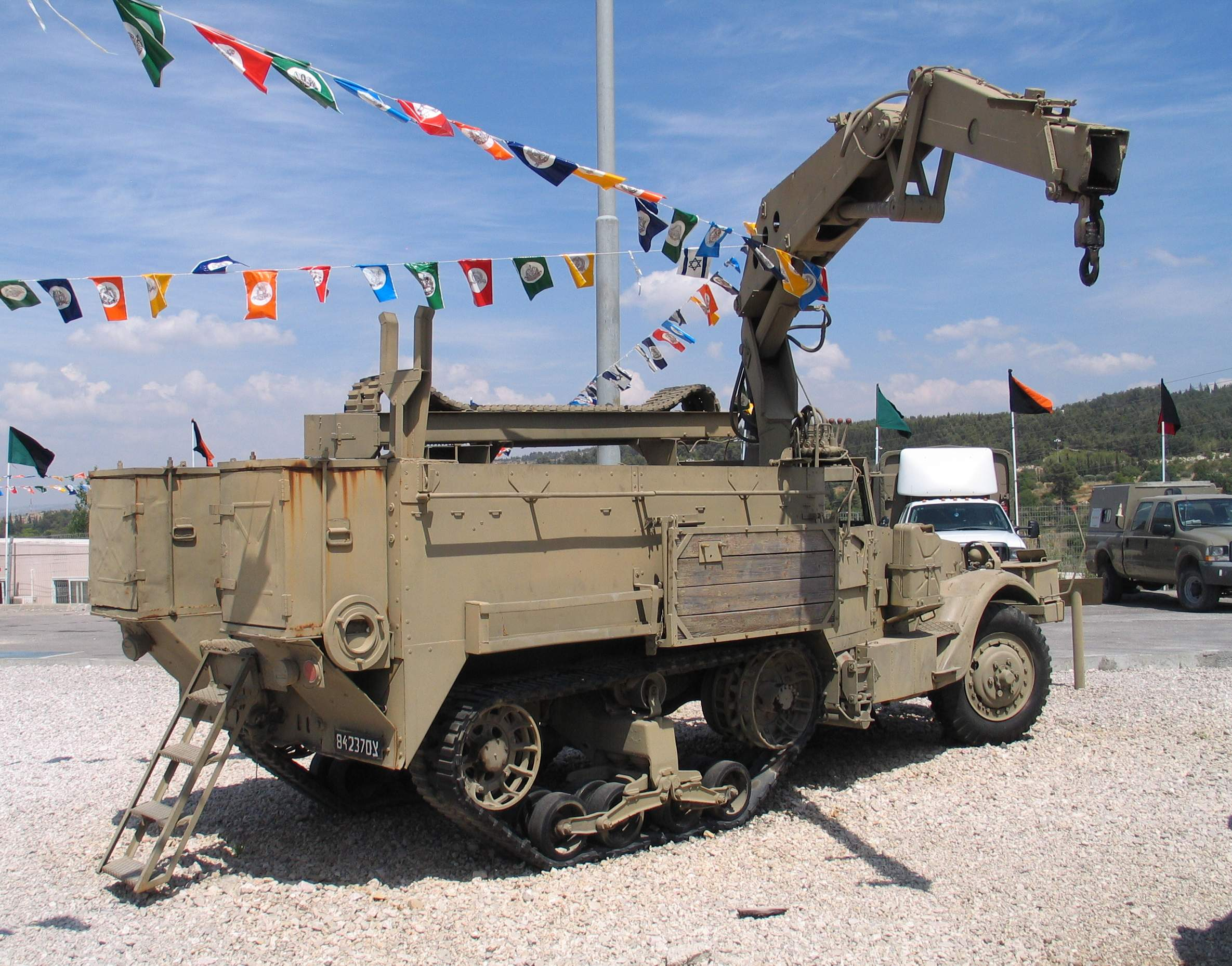
Israeli M3 halftrack with "Eyal" crane. "Yad La-Shiryon" museum, Latrun, Israel.

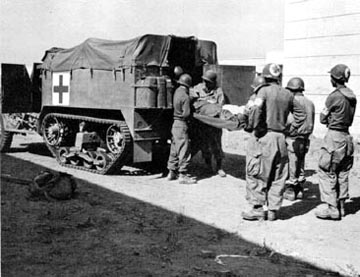
M3 half-track ambulance

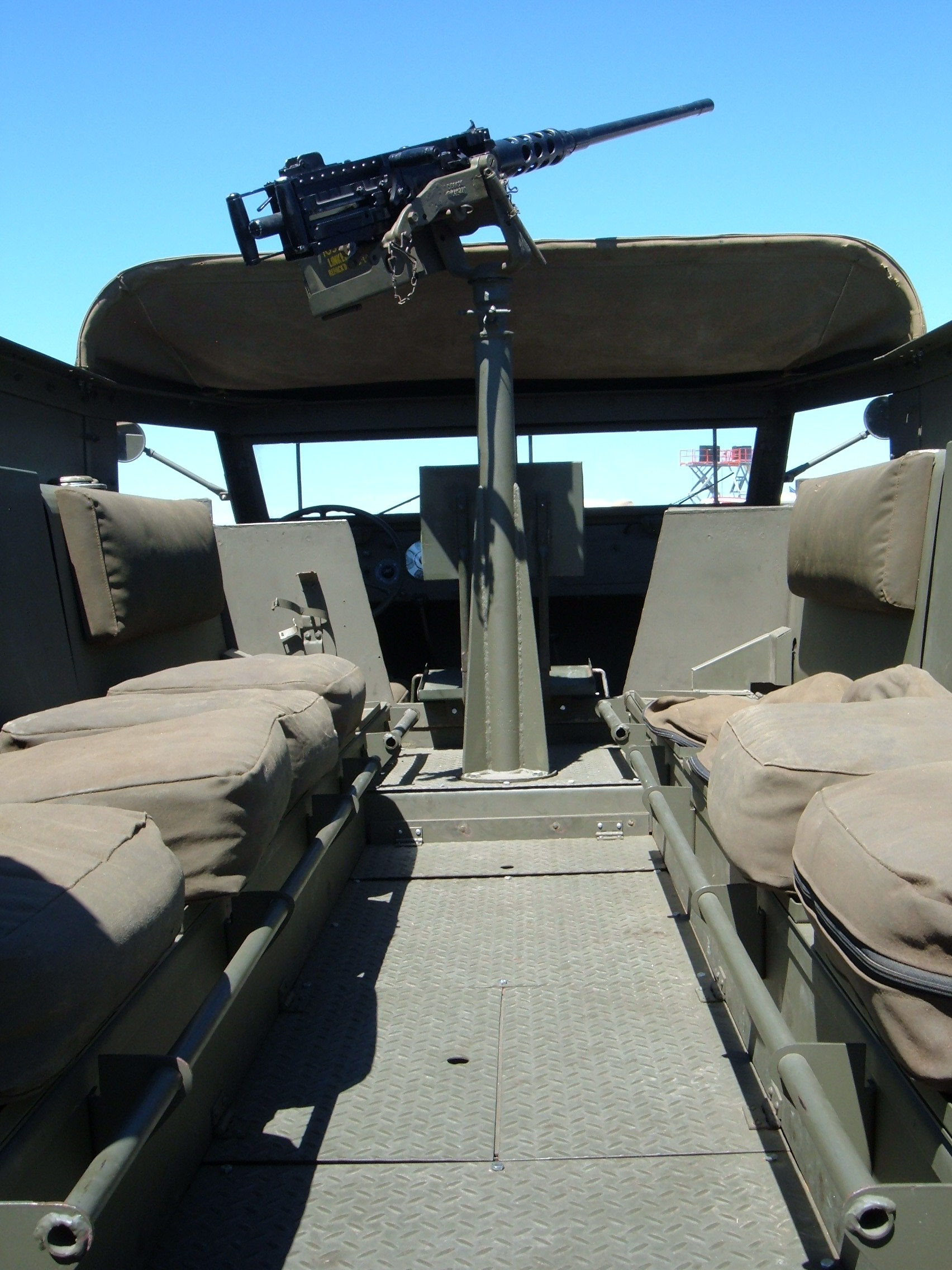
M3 half-track with Browning M2 machine guns

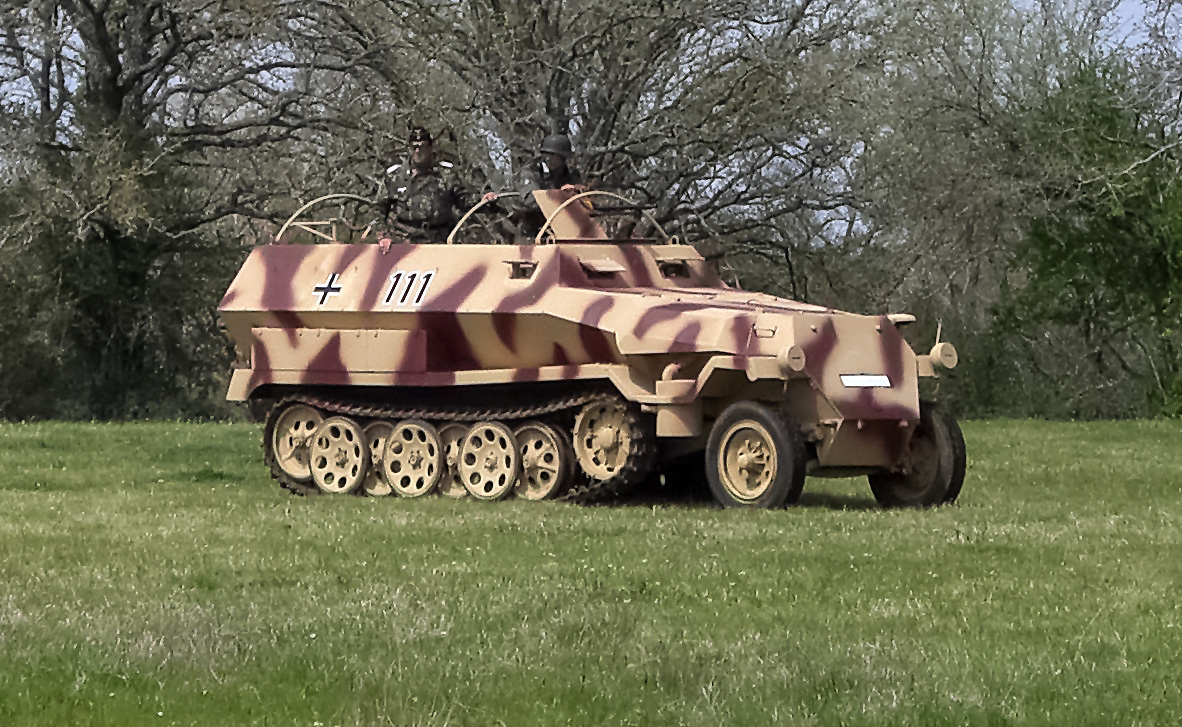
German half-track at Museum of the American GIs

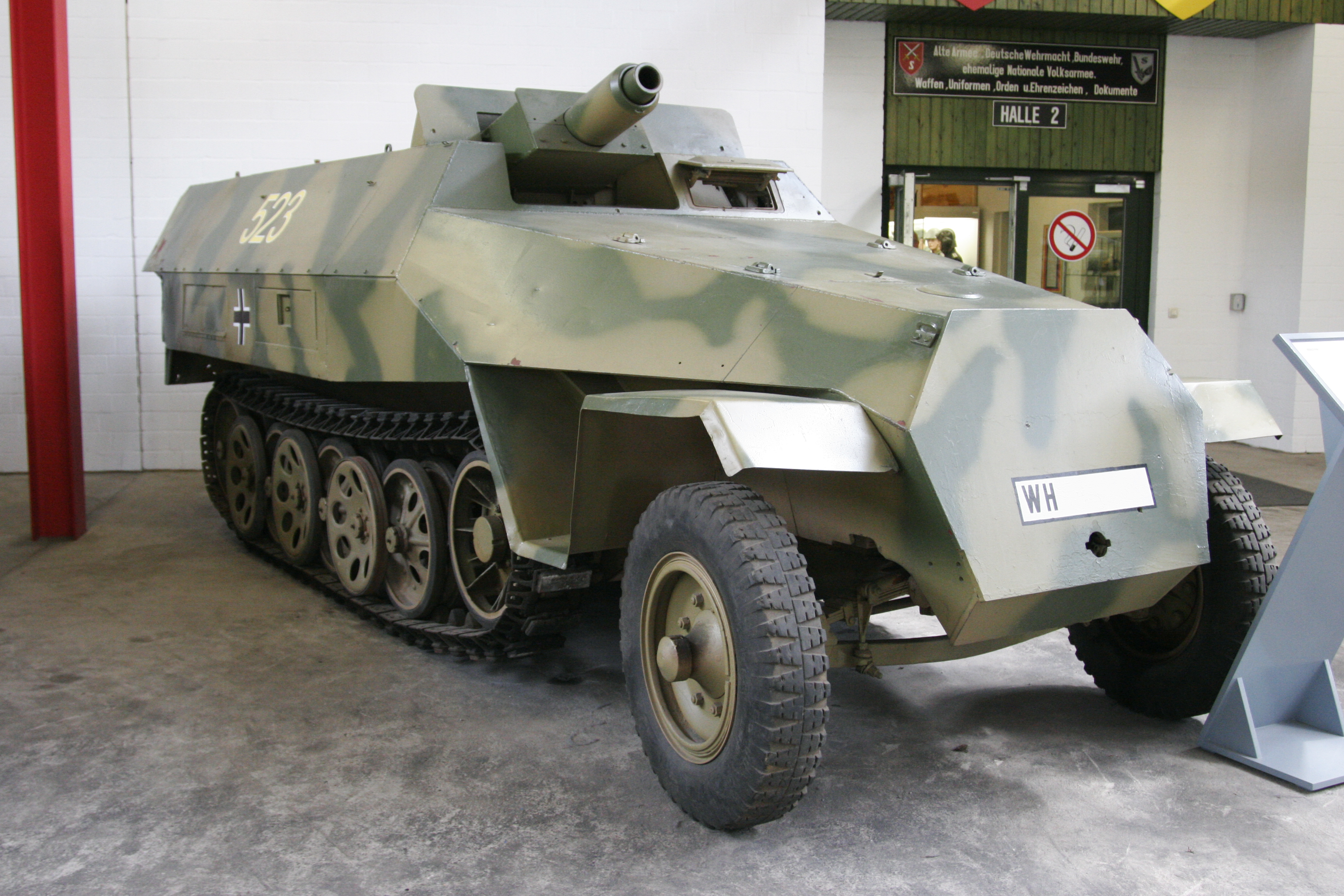
Sd.Kfz. 251/9 "Stummel"

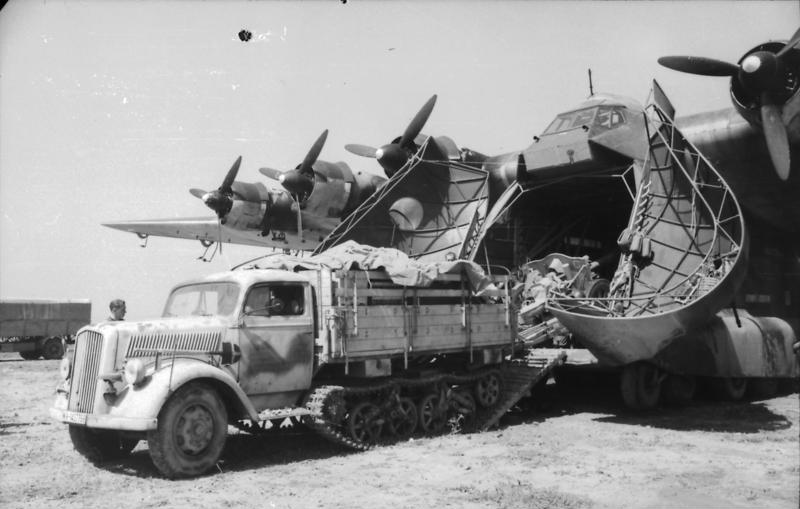
Opel Maultier exiting a Me 323

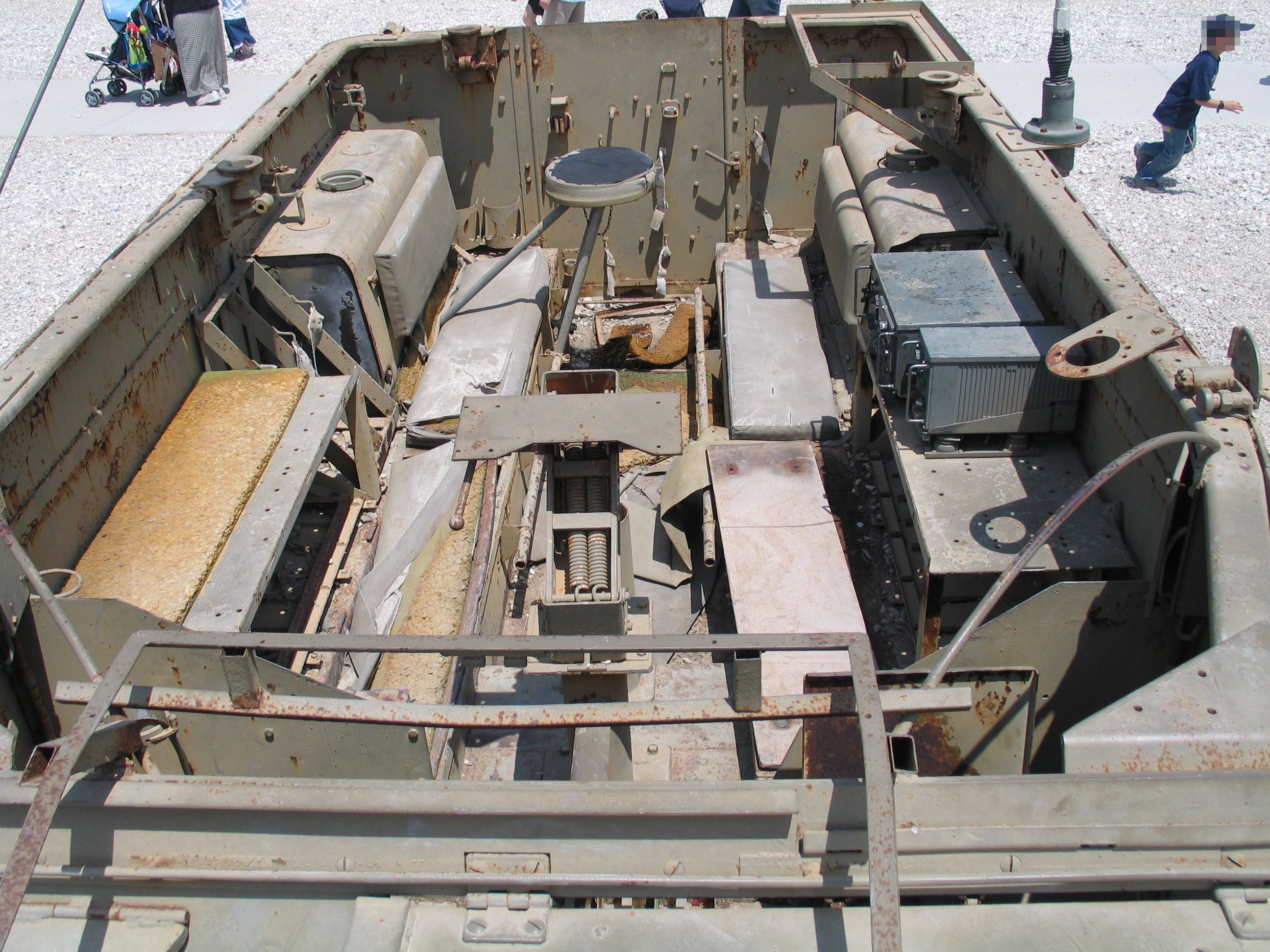
M5 half-track, open top seating

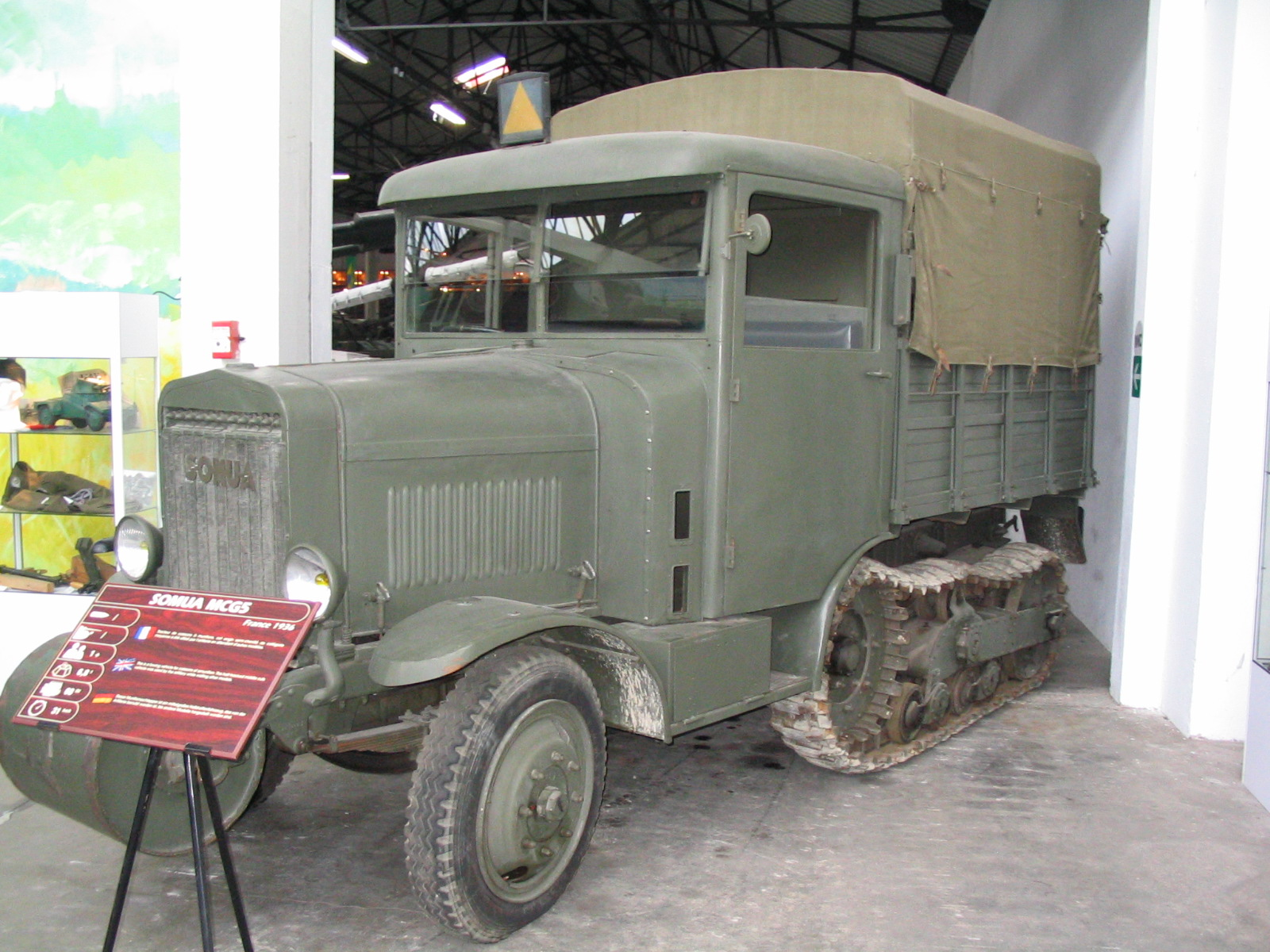
SOMUA MCG on display at Musée des Blindés

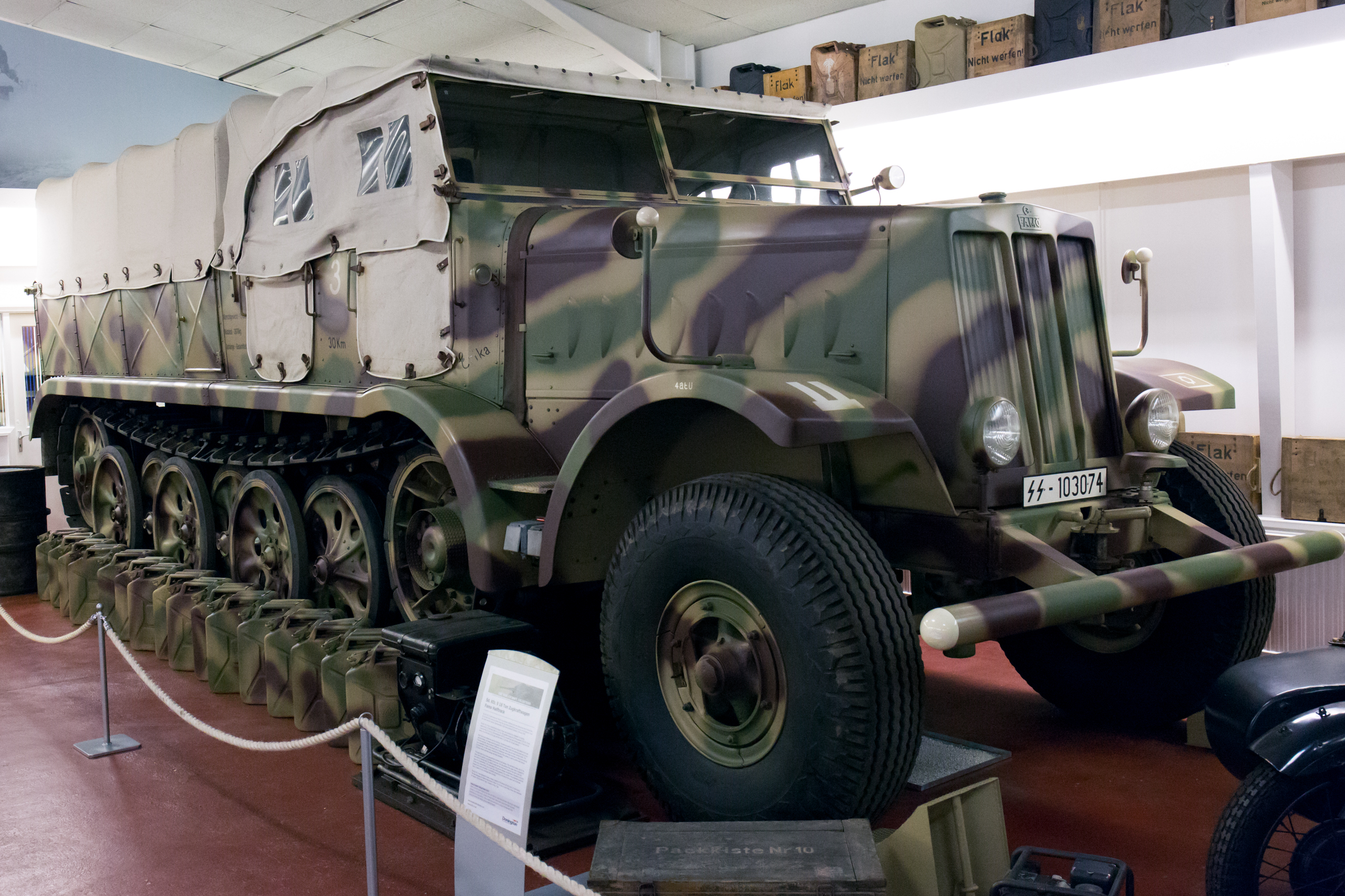
Sd.Kfz. 9

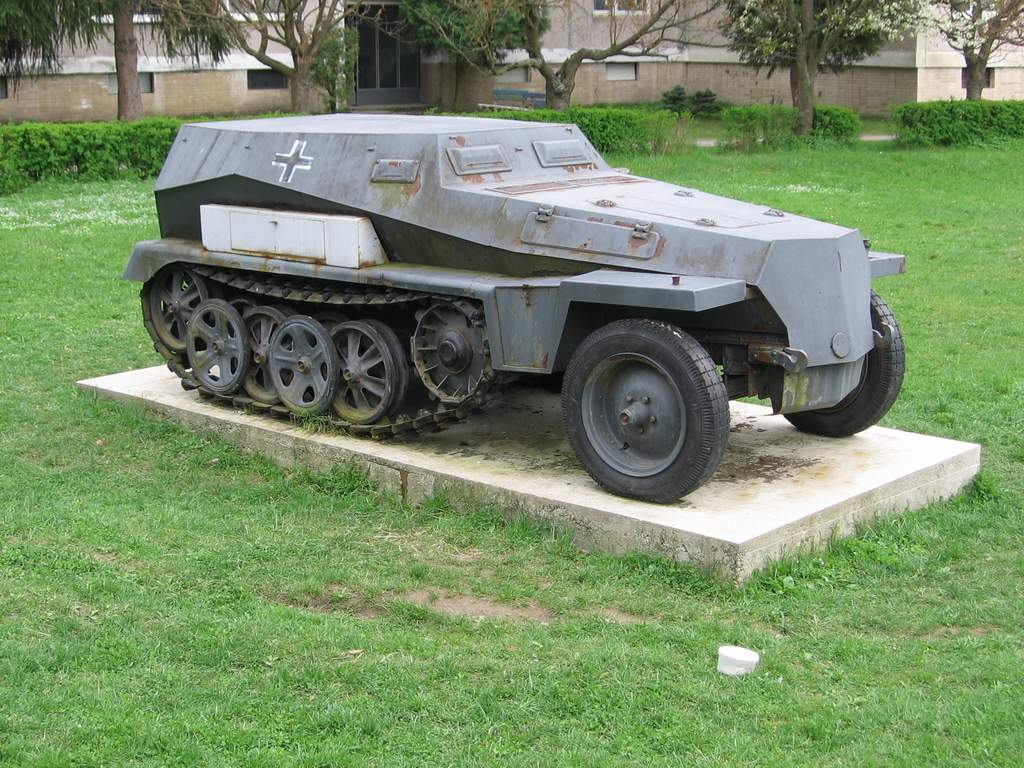
German Sd.Kfz. 250 half-track

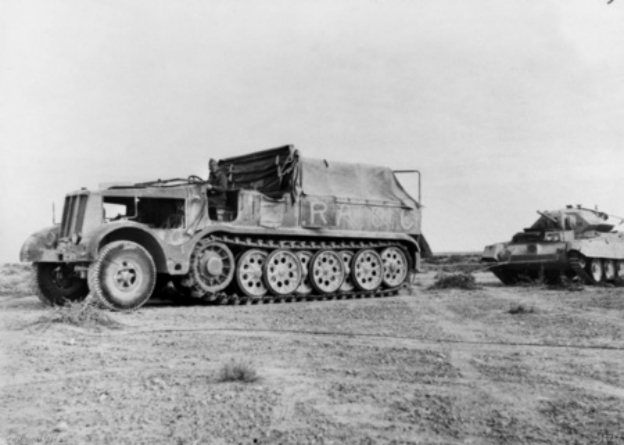
Sd.Kfz. 9 pulls tank

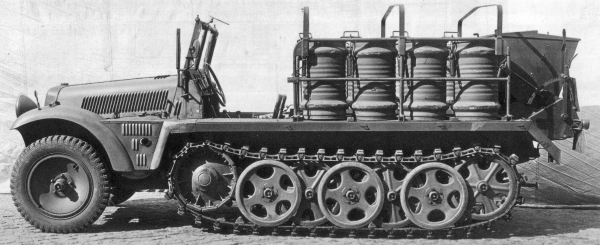
Sd.Kfz. 10/2

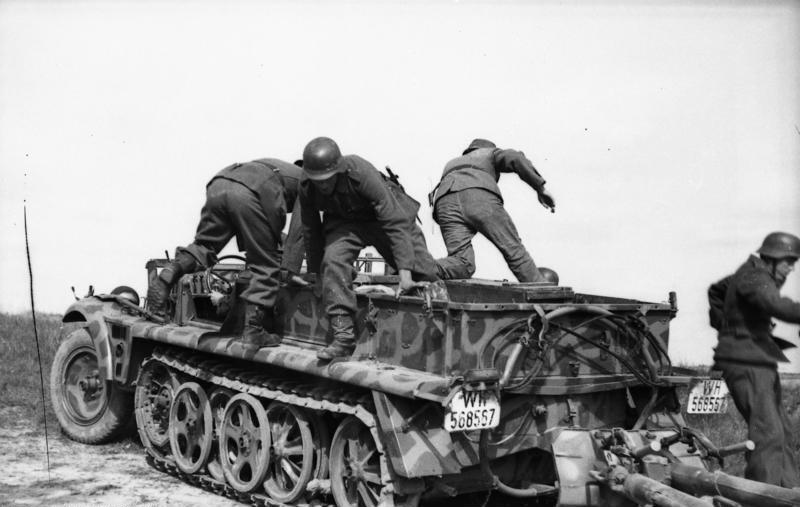
Sd.Kfz. 10

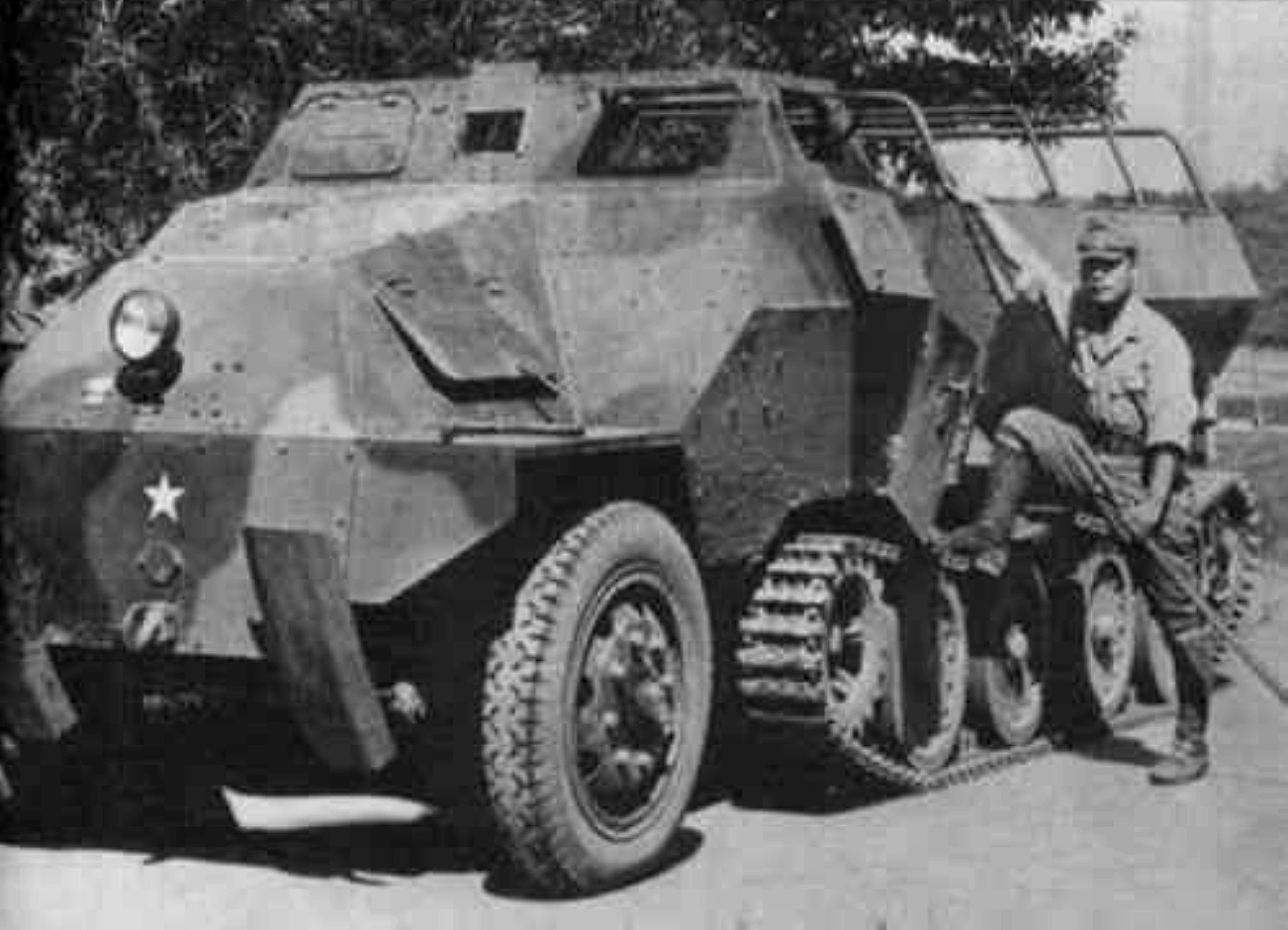
Imperial Japanese Army Type 1 Ho-Ha

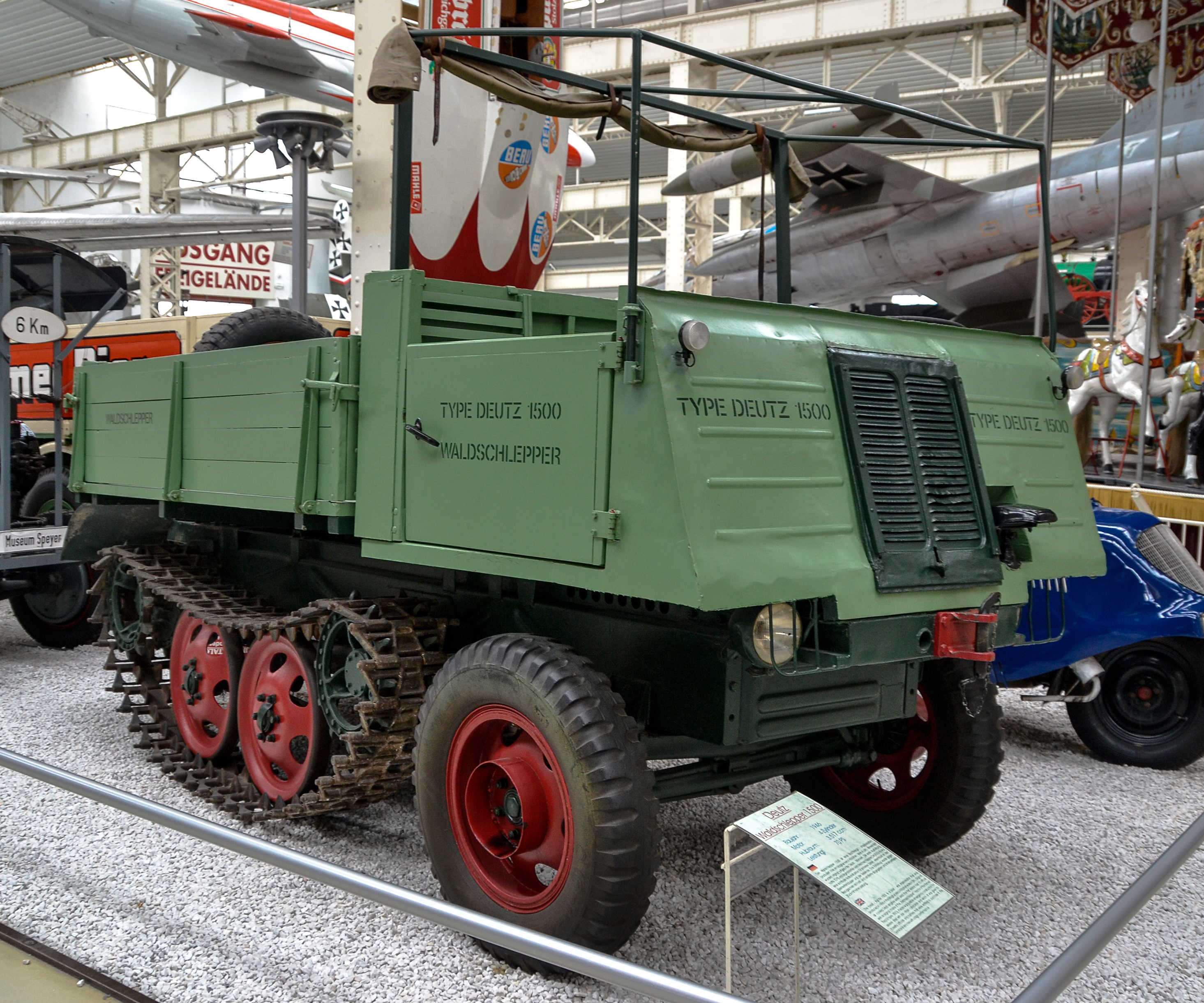
Civilian half-track Waldschlepper as a forestry vehicle

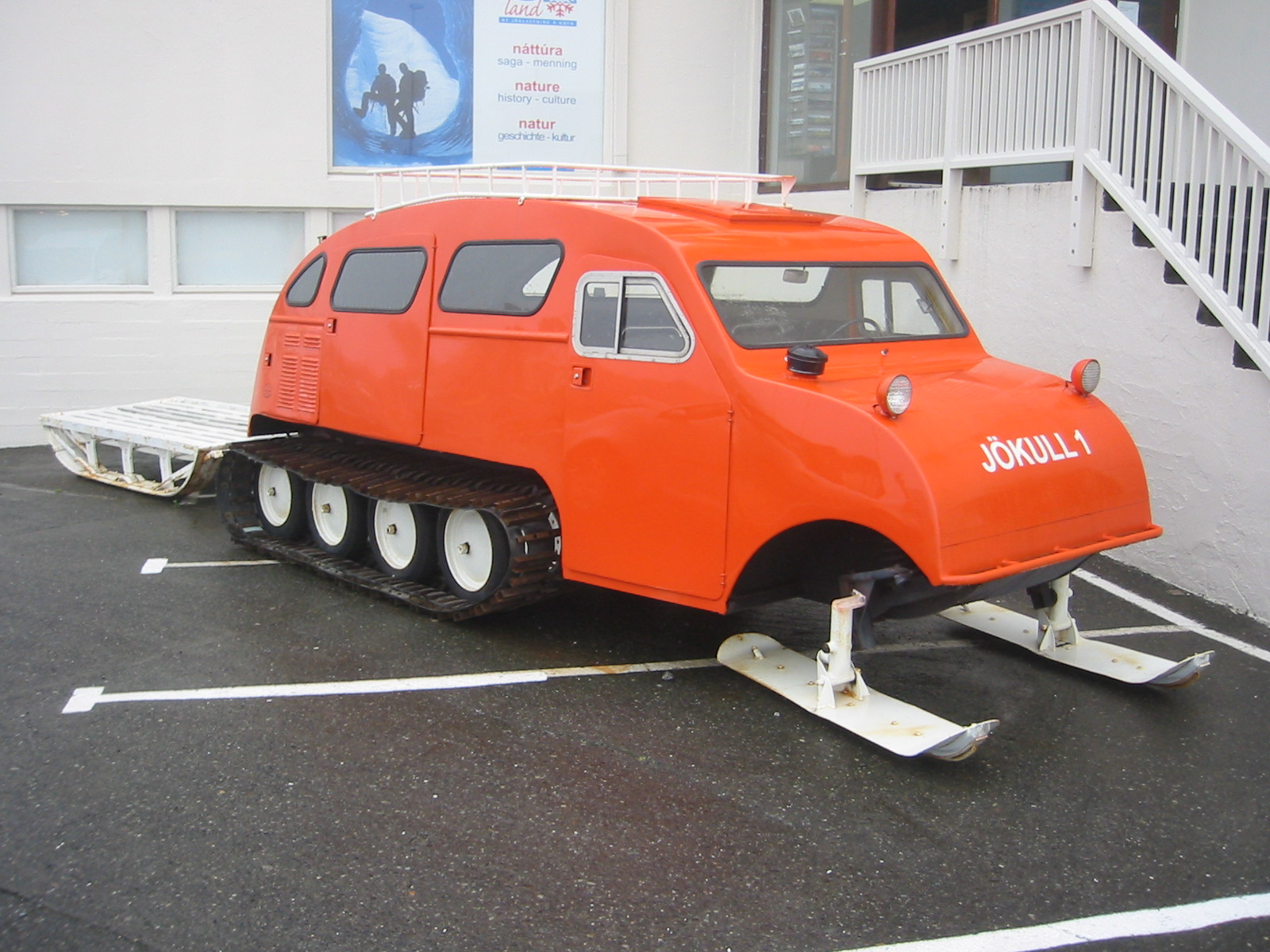
Half-track glacier crawler at Höfn

== See also ==
- Armoured warfare
- Universal Carrier
