= KFZ.1 Kübelwagen: Volkswagen Type 82 =

KFZ.1 Kübelwagen: Volkswagen Type 82 is a reference work published by Almark Publication in 1978 about a military vehicle used by German forces during World War II.

== Contents ==
During World War II, Ferdinand Porsche designed and Volkswagen produced a light military vehicle for German forces called the Kübelwagen (literally 'bucket car'). It was prototyped and first deployed in Poland as the Type 62, but following improvements entered full-scale production as the Type 82.

KFZ.1 Kübelwagen: Volkswagen Type 82 is a reference book about the later model. The book has a brief introduction, but is mainly a collection of photographs of the Kübelwagen during development, including images of prototypes that never reached production. Photographs show the Kübelwagen in various theatres of the war, and four colour plates illustrate the various colour and camouflage schemes that were used. The book also contains information about an amphibious version, the Schwimmwagen, as well the Trippel SG6, a similar-sized amphibious light vehicle developed by Hans Trippel.

== Publication history ==
KFZ.1 Kübelwagen: Volkswagen Type 82 is a 52-page book written by Tony Oliver and published by Almark Publication in 1978.

== Reception ==
In Issue 29 of Dragon (September 1979), Tim Kask, an admitted Volkswagen lover, found this book "to be fascinating, both from a military viewpoint and also from the ownership viewpoint." He concluded with a strong recommendation for other Volkswagen fans as well as armored vehicle enthusiasts, saying, "This small book is fascinating and makes an interesting addition to any World War II armor buff's library."

In Volume 29 of the United States Army Combat Journal, the reviewer thought the target audience of this book was "the equipment enhusiast."
