= Automobiles Marathon =

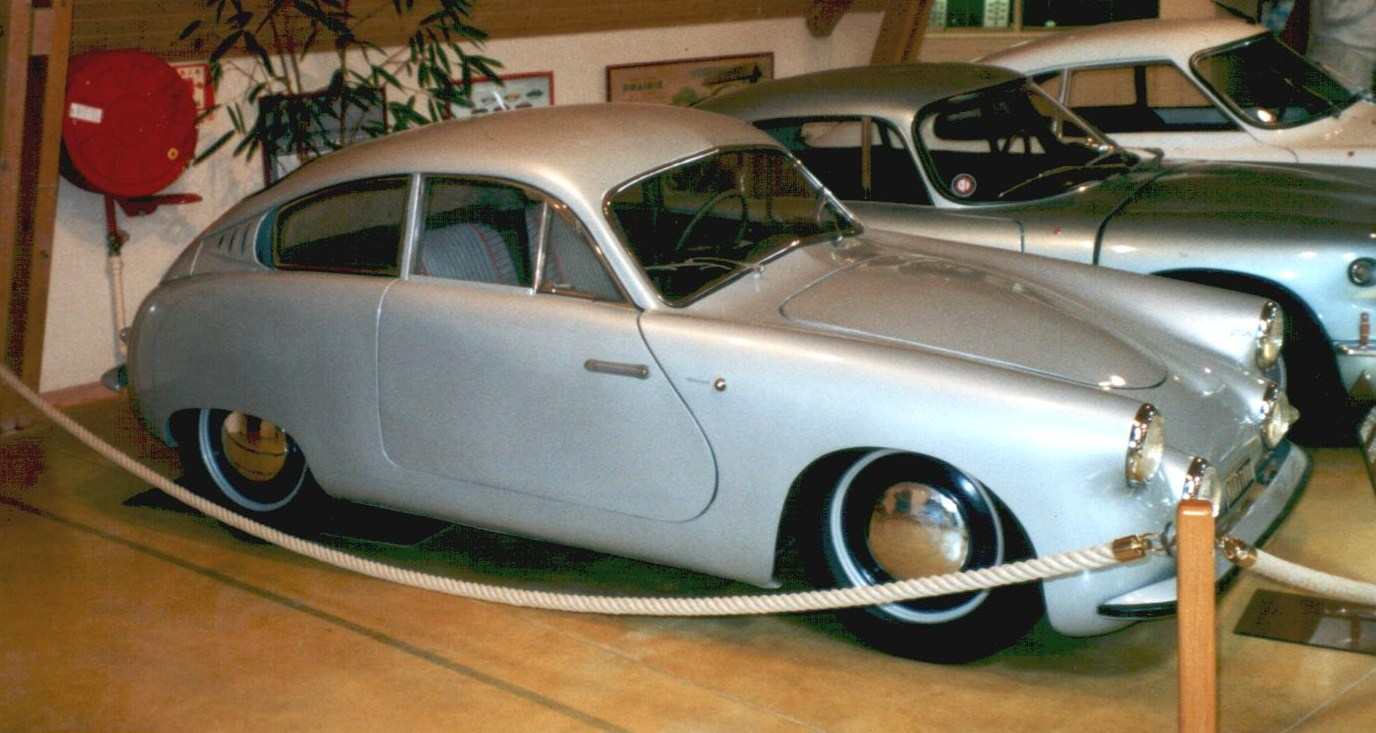
Marathon (1953)

Marathon was a French automobile manufacturer established by a group of engineers under the leadership of a rally enthusiast called Bernard Denis. Prototypes for a lightweight sports coupé were presented at various motor shows starting with the 1951 Frankfurt Motor Show and the cars were produced between 1953 and 1955.

== The cars ==
The cars were derived from a design by Hans Trippel with a silhouette not unlike that of the Porsche 356, and it has been suggested that the manufacturer's founder, Bernard Denis, dreamed of producing a French Porsche equivalent.

The first car, like several lightweight sports cars appearing in France at this time, was powered by the two-cylinder boxer engine from the Panhard Dyna X (and later the Panhard Dyna Z) which produced at this stage a claimed 42 hp from 850 cc of cylinder capacity. There was a coupé version, branded as the Marathon Corsair, and a roadster, branded as the Marathon Pirate.

== History ==
The technical enthusiasts who established the Marathon car business purchased the design from Hans Trippel (1908–2001) who had been released from war-related imprisonment in 1949 and at this point was based in Stuttgart. Trippel had constructed his prototype in 1950: it already featured the stylish fast-back body work and rear-hinged doors that would define the Marathon Corsair. Trippel's steel-bodied prototype was propelled by a Zündapp 600 cc engine producing just over 18 hp.

In order to fit the larger Panhard engine, the Marathon team were obliged slightly to adapt the rear of the car, which lost a little of the cleanness of form that had characterised the Trippel prototype. At the front they also had to raise the level of the head-lights in order to conform with French regulations. By the time the car appeared at the Brussels Motor Show in January 1953, these changes had been effected, and the car's name had been changed from Trippel to Marathon.

In June 1953 Marathon's first pre-production prototype was presented to Gilles Guérithault who was managing editor of L'Auto-Journal, and who thereby obtain exclusive details of the car which would debut in production form only in October at the Paris Motor Show. By then arrangements were in place to produce the car at the Societé Industrielle de l'Ouest Parisien (SIOP) factory in the Boulevard de Dixmude on the western side of Paris, previously the manufacturing location for Rosengart automobiles.

The production cars were not steel bodied, but were constructed from a material initially christened at the plant "polyester", but which is better understood as a series of layers of glass fibre and resin, a lightweight material that would become popular with low volume producers in the UK and elsewhere for "fibreglass" car bodies. The Marathon was something of a pioneer in this respect, and the resulting light body combined with an engine delivering more than twice the power of Trippel's original prototype gave rise to a level of performance that was, by the standards of the time and category of the car, very lively indeed. The top speed was approximately 150 km/h (93 mph).

== Enthusiasts ==
Since 2011 a Marathon Corsair is on display at the Manoir de l'Automobile in Lohéac, France.

== Sources and references ==
- Harald H. Linz, Halwart Schrader: Die große Automobil-Enzyklopädie. BLV, München 1986, ISBN 3-405-12974-5
- G.N. Georgano: Autos. Encyclopédie complète. 1885 à nos jours. Courtille, 1975 (French)
