= Amphicar =

Amphibious automobile launched in 1961

Amphicar Model 770
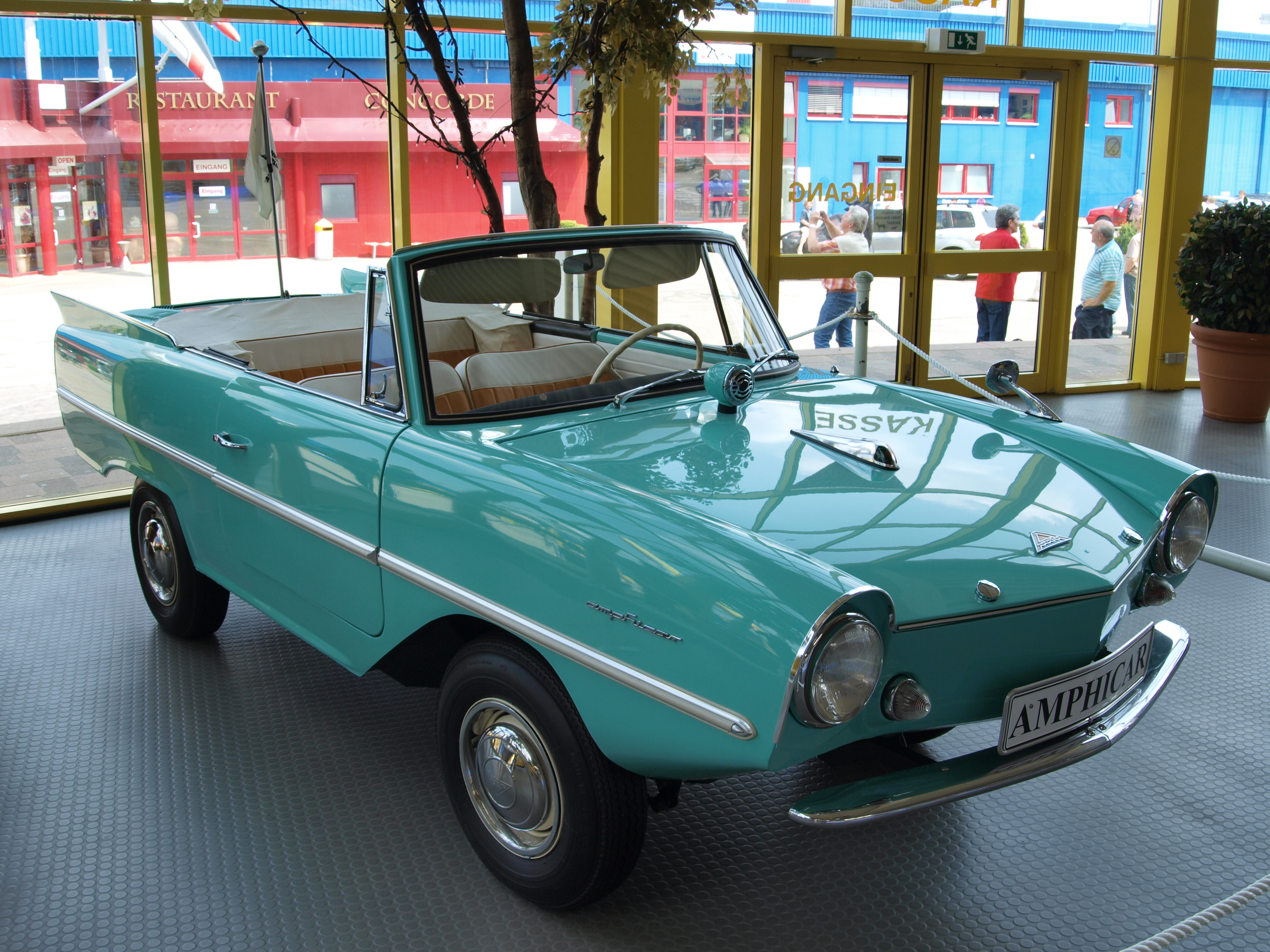
- Amphicar Model 770

Overview
- Manufacturer: Quandt Group
- Production: 1960–1965; 3,878 built
- Model years: 1960–1968
- Designer: Hans Trippel

Body and chassis
- Body style: 2-door cabriolet with boat features
- Layout: RR layout

Powertrain
- Engine: 1147 cc straight-4 (Triumph)
- Power output: 38 brake horsepower (39 PS; 28 kW) @ 4,750 rpm 88 newton-metres (65 lbf⋅ft) 2,500 rpm
- Transmission: 4-speed all-synchromesh manual

Dimensions
- Wheelbase: 84 in (2,134 mm)
- Length: 171 in (4,343 mm)
- Width: 62 in (1,575 mm)
- Height: 60 in (1,524 mm)
- Curb weight: 2,315–2,324 lb (1,050–1,054 kg)

The Amphicar Model 770 is an amphibious automobile which was launched at the 1961 New York Auto Show. It was made in West Germany and marketed from 1961 to 1968, with production ceasing in 1965.

Designed by Hans Trippel, the amphibious vehicle was manufactured by the Quandt Group at Lübeck and at Berlin-Borsigwalde, with a total of 3,878 manufactured in a single generation. The name Amphicar is a portmanteau of "amphibious" and "car".

A spiritual descendant of the Volkswagen Schwimmwagen, and the Trippel SG6, the Amphicar offered only modest performance compared to most contemporary boats or cars, featured navigation lights and flag as mandated by the US Coast Guard – and after operation in water, required greasing at 13 points, one of which required removal of the rear seat.

In 2014, the publication Petrolicious described the Amphicar as "good for one thing: fun. It's not quick or flashy, but it's iconic, unique and friendly. What more could you ask from a vintage car? The Amphicar might not make any sense and that's precisely why it's so wonderful."

== Product description (1966 Amphicar Model 770) ==
Engine: Triumph four-cylinder engine of 1147 cc, 8:1 compression ratio, rated at 43 bhp

Chassis/body

Overall length	14.250 ft (4.343 m)
Overall width	5.083 ft (1.549 m)
Height	5.000 ft (1.524 m)
Turning circle	36.833 ft (9.398 m)
Wheelbase	7.000 ft (2.134 m)
Front track	4.000 ft (1.219 m)
Rear track	4.083 ft (1.245 m)
Fuel tank capacity	10.5 imperial gallons (13.125 U.S. gallons; 49.7 litres)
Empty weight	2,315 lb (1050 kg) (includes fuel and oil)

Appearance

Front undersurface is slightly pointed and sharply cut away below. The wheels are set low, so that the vehicle stands well above ground level when on dry land. Front and rear bumpers are placed low on the body panels (but fairly high in relation to dry ground). The one-piece windshield is curved. The foldable top causes the body style to be classified as cabriolet. Its water propulsion is provided by twin propellers mounted under the rear bumper. The Amphicar is made of mild steel.

== Powertrain ==
The Amphicar's engine was mounted at the rear of the craft, driving the rear wheels through a 4-speed manual transmission. For use in the water, the same engine drove a pair of reversible propellers at the rear, with a second gear lever engaging forward or reverse drive. Once in the water, the main gear lever would normally be left in neutral. By engaging first gear as well as drive to the propellers when approaching a boat ramp, the Amphicar could drive itself out of the water.

== Performance ==
The powerplant was the 1147 cc (69 in^{3}) Standard SC engine from the British Triumph Herald 1200. Many engines were tried in prototypes, but the Triumph engine was "state of the art" in 1961 and it had the necessary combination of performance, weight, cool running, and reliability. Updated versions of this engine remained in production in the Triumph Spitfire until 1980. The Amphicar engine had a power output of 43 hp (32 kW) at 4750 rpm, slightly more than the Triumph Herald due to a shorter exhaust. Designated the "Model 770", the Amphicar could achieve speeds of 7 knots in the water and 70 mph (110 km/h) on land. Later versions of the engine displaced 1296 cc and 1493 cc and produced up to 75 bhp (56 kW). In water as well as on land, the Amphicar is steered with the front wheels, making it less maneuverable than a conventional boat.

== History ==
Production started in late 1960. By the end of 1963, complete production was stopped. From 1963 to 1965 cars were assembled from shells and parts inventory built up in anticipation of sales of 25,000 units, with the last new build units assembled in 1965. Cars were titled in the year they actually sold rather than when they were produced, e.g. an unsold Amphicar assembled in 1963 or 1965 could be titled as 1967 or 1968 if that was when it was first sold. Although the inventory could not be sold in the U.S. in the 1968 model year or later due to new environmental and USDOT emissions and safety equipment standards, they were available in other countries into 1968. The remaining inventory of unused parts was eventually purchased by Hugh Gordon of Santa Fe Springs, California.

Most Amphicars were sold in the United States. Cars were sold in the United Kingdom from 1964. Total production was 3,878 vehicles, of which only 97 were right-hand drive. Some were used in the Berlin police department and others were fitted for rescue operations.

== Gallery ==
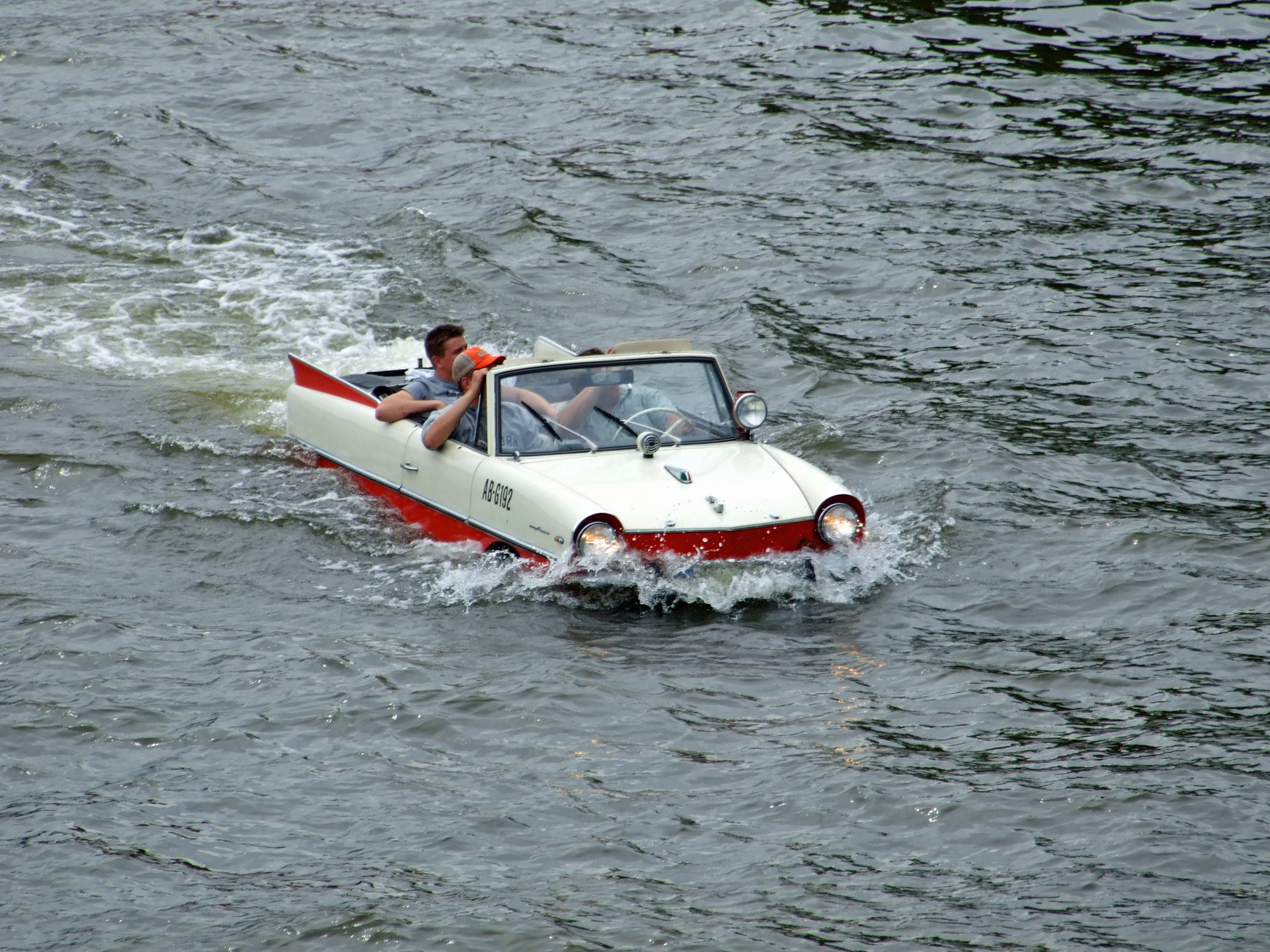
Boating (Main in Frankfurt)

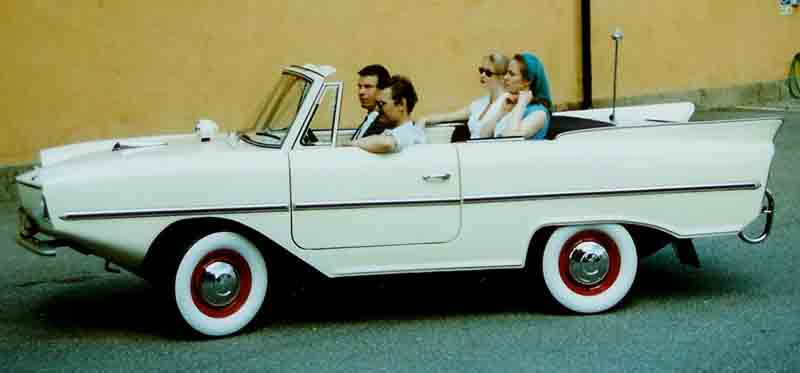
Motoring

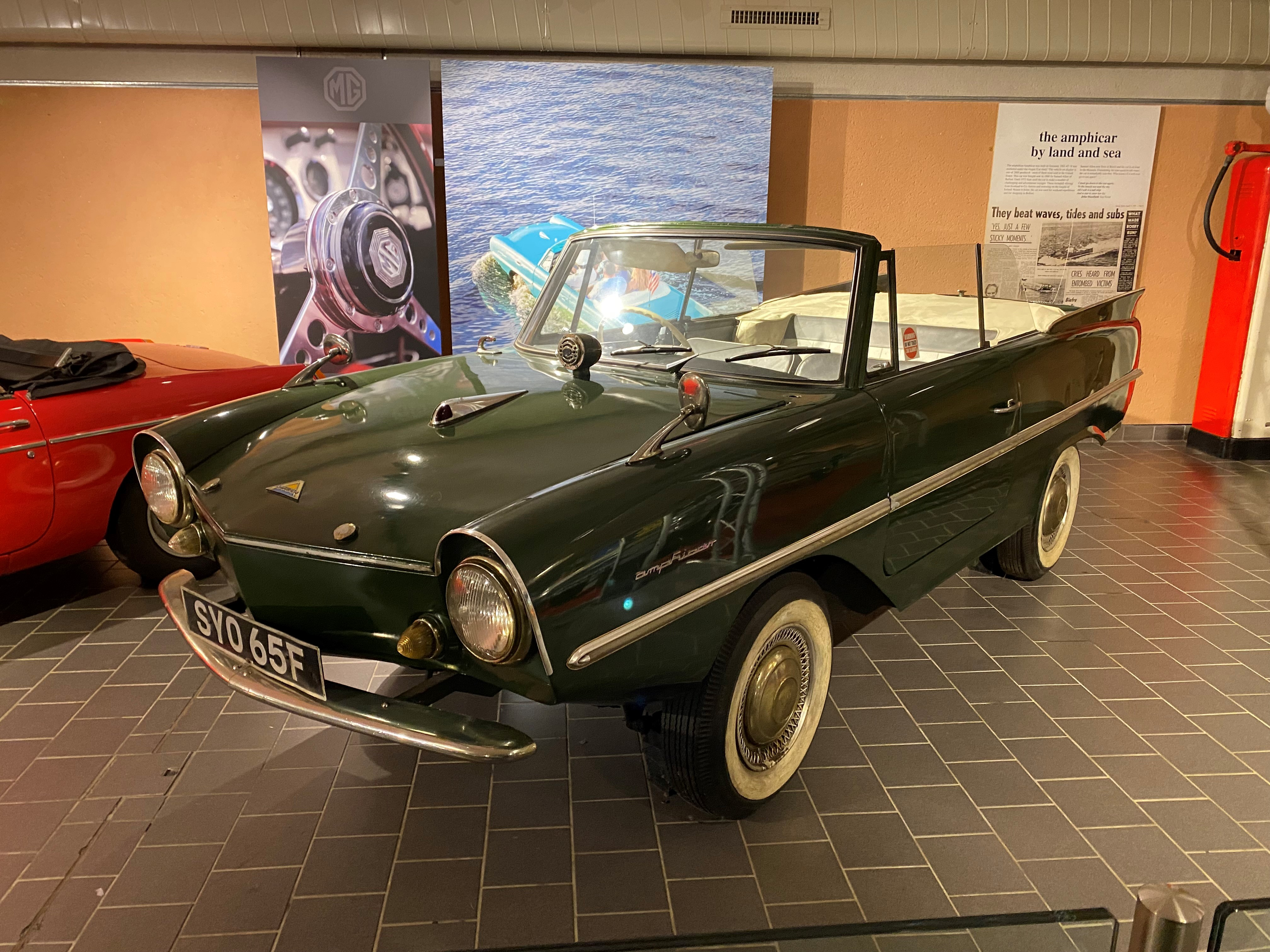
A righthand drive Amphicar at the Ulster Folk and Transport museum, Northern Ireland

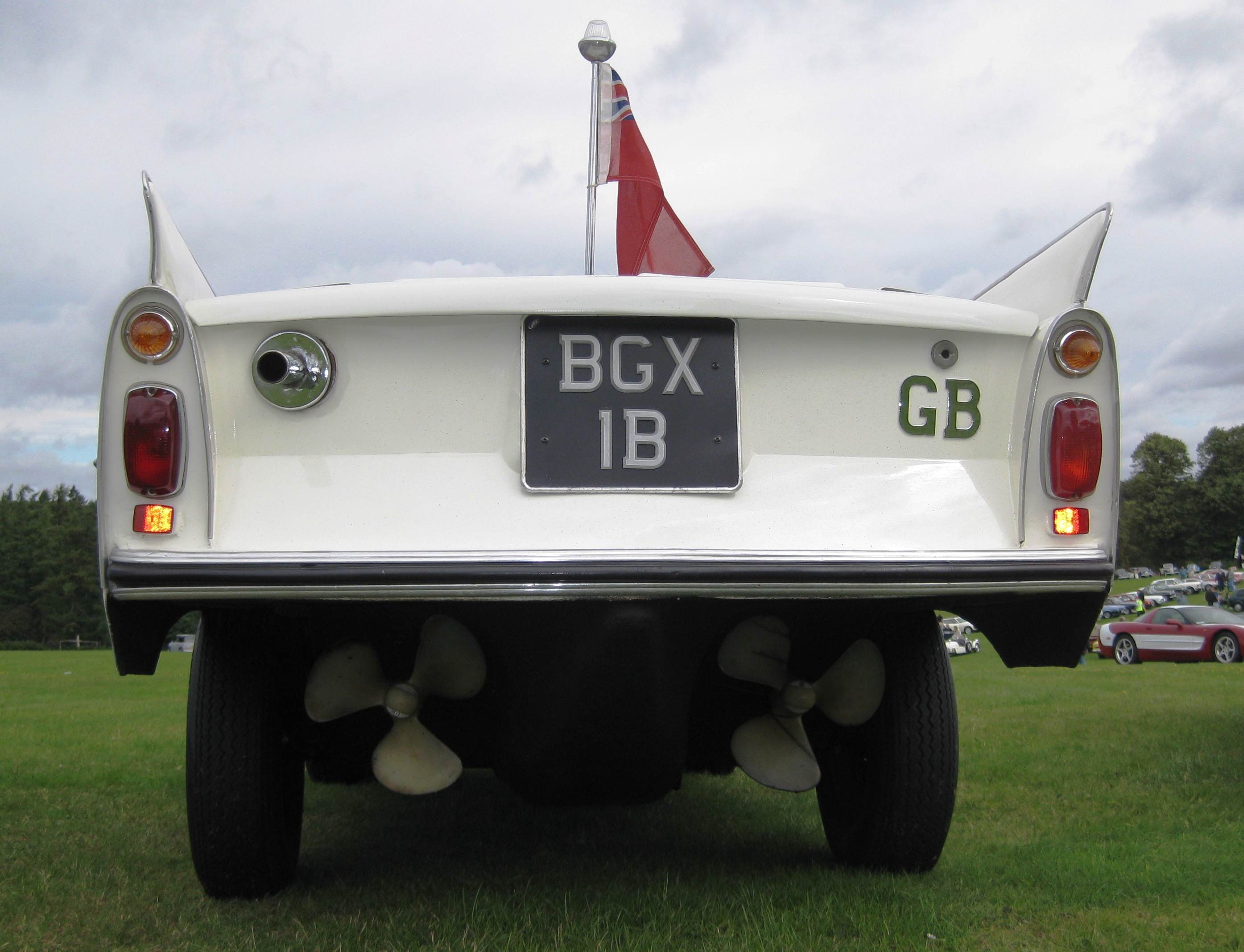
Propulsion is provided by twin propellers mounted under the rear bumper

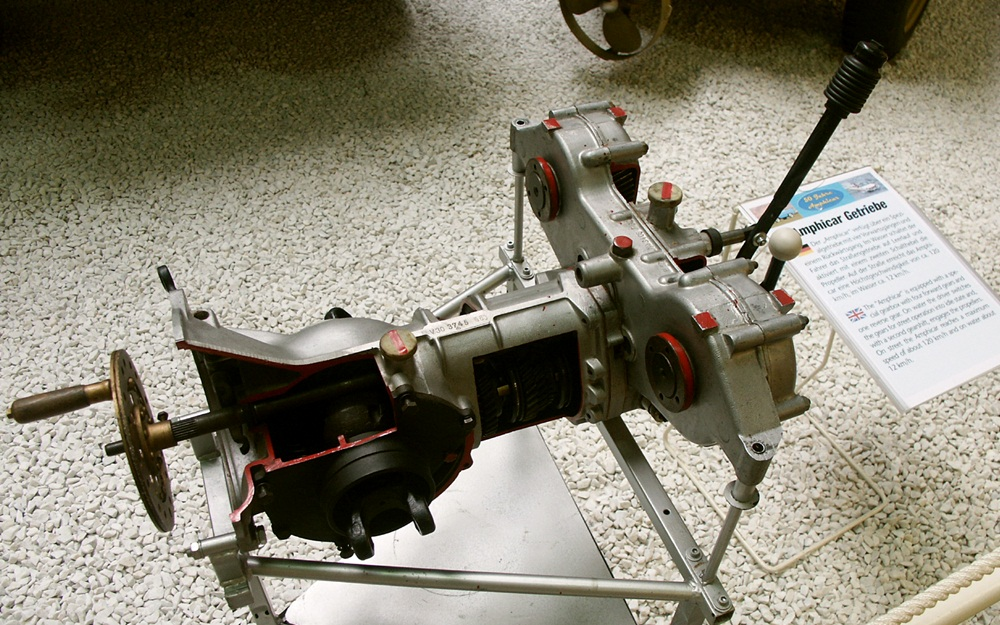
Amphicar gearbox

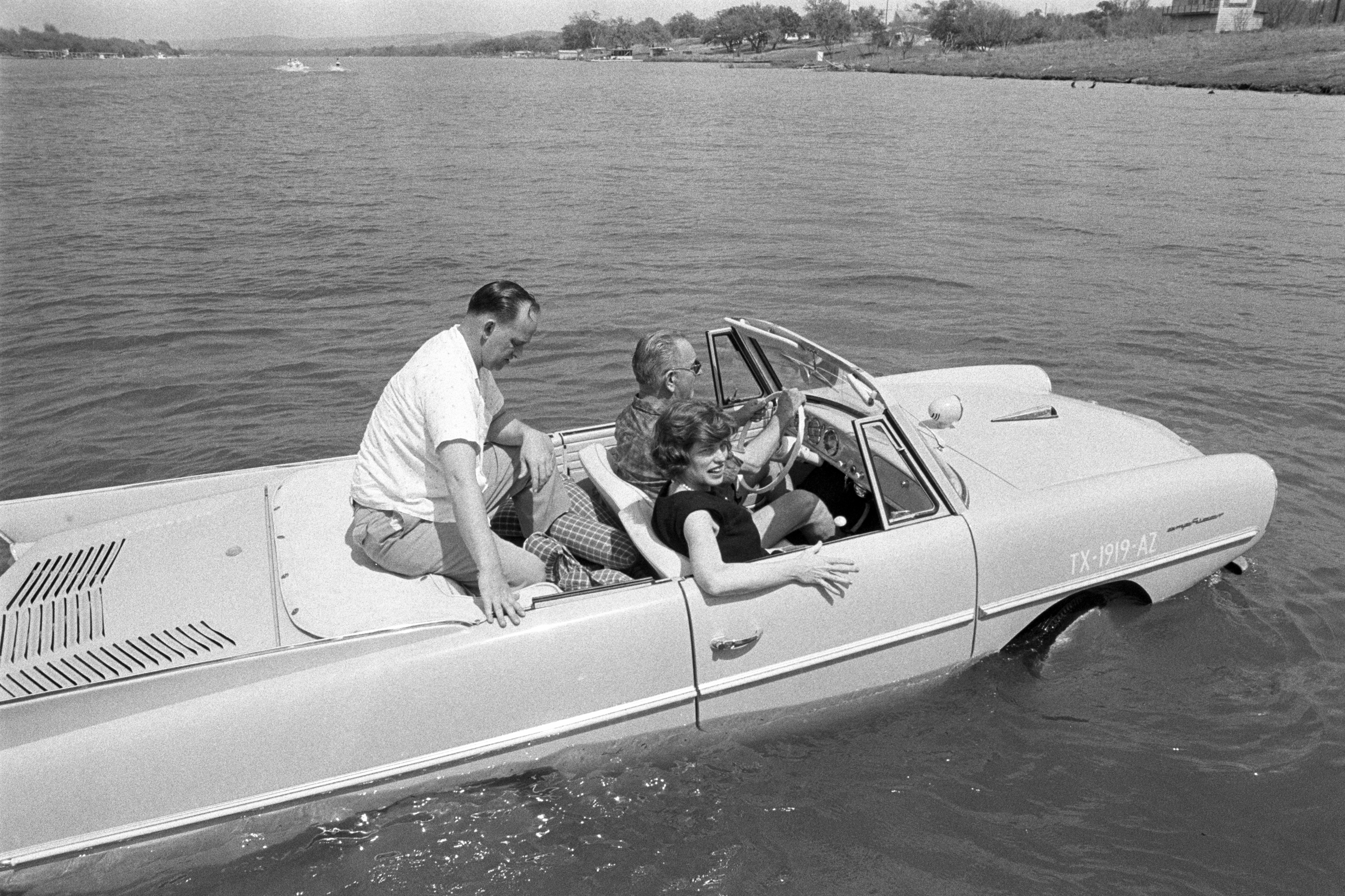
President Lyndon B. Johnson driving an Amphicar, 1965

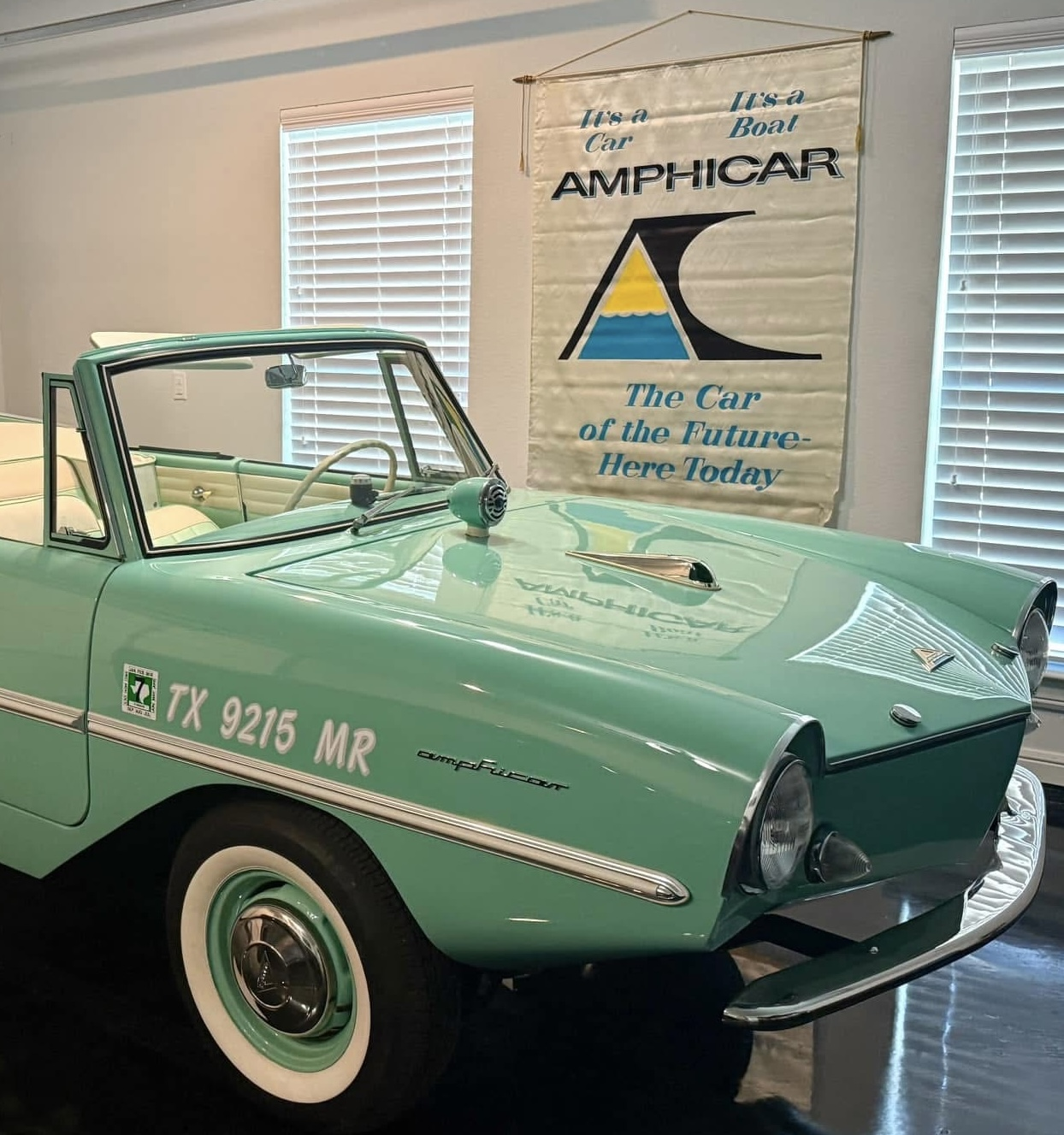
Dealership Banner From the Early 1960s

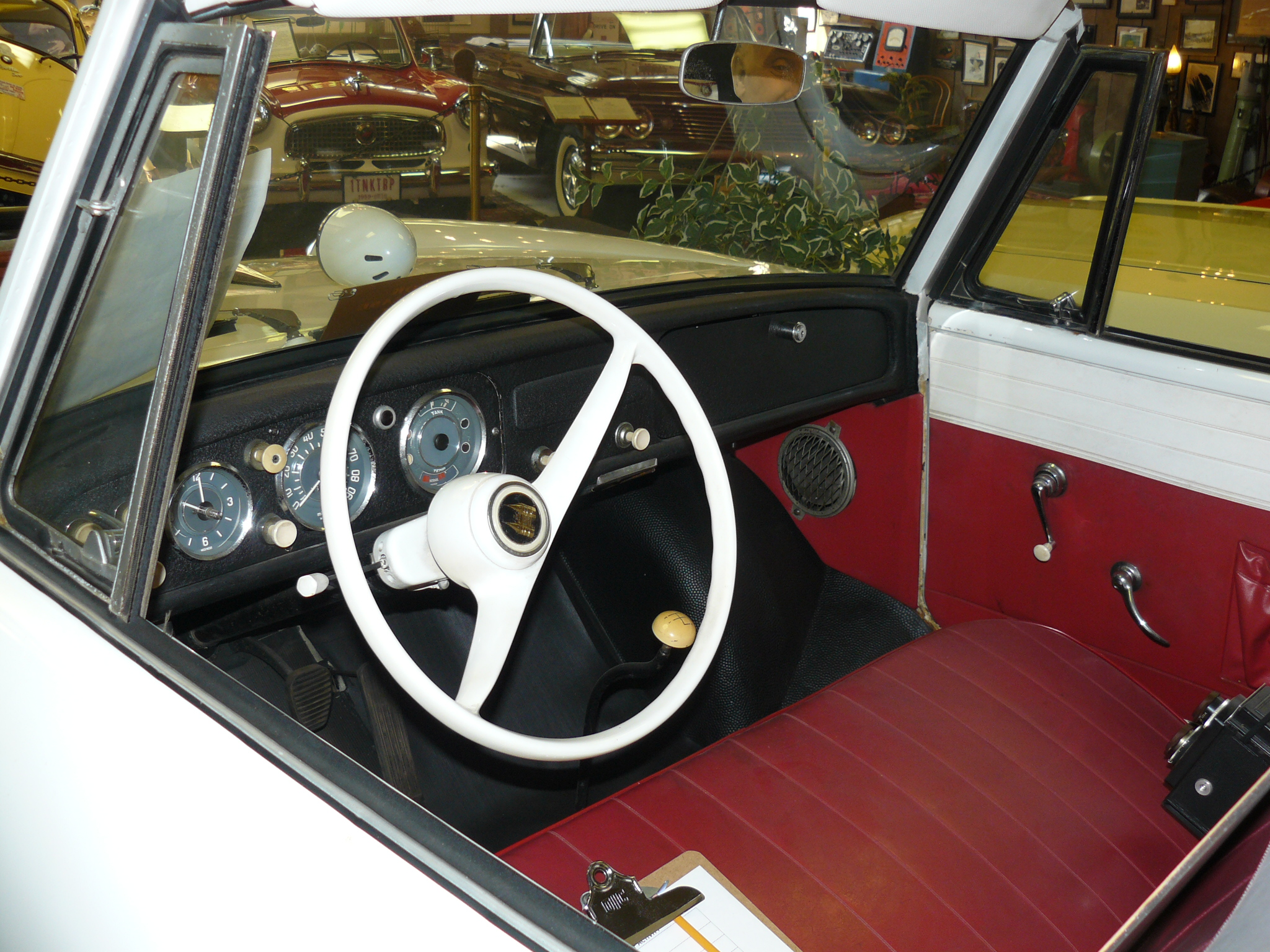
1962 Amphicar interior

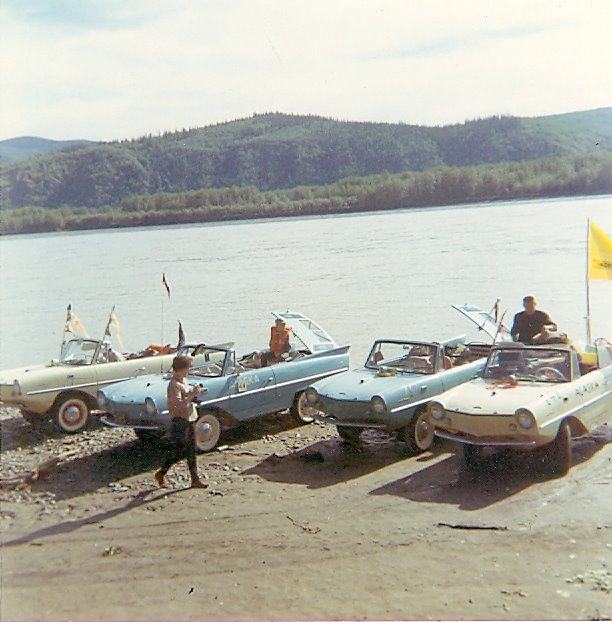
Four Amphicars on the bank of the Yukon River at Coffee Creek. August 1967

== Amphicar shows and rides ==
Amphicar owners regularly convene during the spring, summer, and fall at various locations nationwide for "swim-ins", the largest of which is held at Grand Lake St. Marys State Park, Ohio.

In 2015, the Boathouse at Walt Disney World's Disney Springs in Orlando, Florida, began offering public Amphicar rides to visitors, charging $125 per ride for groups of up to three. Disney heavily re-engineered and enhanced the eight Amphicars of various original colors in its fleet for safety, reliability, and comfort.

== See also ==
- DUKW
- Dutton Cars
- Gibbs Aquada (2004)
- Gibbs Humdinga (2006)
- Gibbs Quadski (2006)
- KdF Schwimmwagen Type 166 (1942)
- Trippel SG6
- Swamp buggy
- WaterCar
- Rinspeed sQuba
