= Gibbs Humdinga =

Overview
- Manufacturer: Gibbs Sports Amphibians

The Gibbs Humdinga is a high speed amphibious vehicle concept designed by Gibbs Technologies. It was publicly announced in February 2012 and was created specifically to access remote and hostile terrain. It uses the same High Speed Amphibian (HSA) technology as the Gibbs Aquada. It has yet to be sold to the public.

The Humdinga transforms from land to water mode when the driver pushes a button. The wheels retract and the power train disconnects from driving the wheels to driving only the jet propulsion system.

On water the Humdinga can reach the 'plane' in less than 10 seconds. It has a curb weight of 3,000 kg (6,614 lb). The vehicle is 7,012 mm (276.1 in) in length, 2,440 mm (96.1 in) in height and 2,304 mm (90.7 in) in width.

This amphibious truck boat (which Gibbs calls an Amphitruck) is switchable between 4 wheel and 2 wheel drive, and can travel at up to 80 miles per hour (130 km/h) on land. Once on water the jet propulsion system allows the vehicle to reach over 30 miles per hour (48 km/h). The vehicle can seat up to 9 occupants (depending on configuration), along with supplies and baggage. The vehicle is run by a powerful 370 bhp (280 kW) engine. It took 15 years and over a million man hours to develop the amphibious technology used, according to Alan Gibbs, co-founder.

== See also ==
- Amphicar (1961)
- Gibbs Aquada (2004)
- Gibbs Quadski (2006)
- WaterCar
- Hummer
