= Gibbs Quadski =

Amphibious quad bike

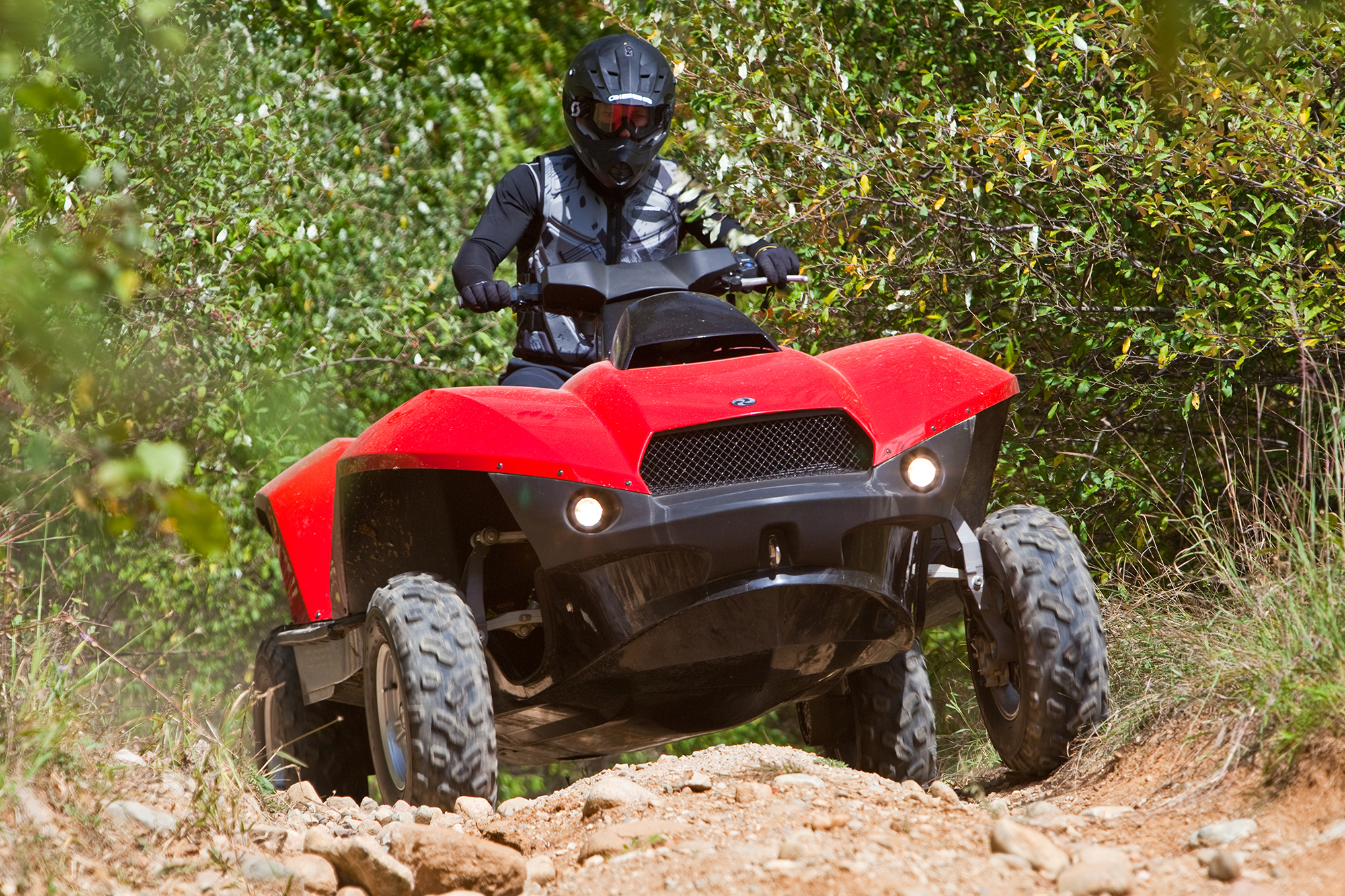
The Quadski driving on land

The Gibbs Quadski is an amphibious quad bike/ATV, launched in October 2012 by Gibbs Sports Amphibians. The Quadski is a 4-stroke amphiquad that converts from a quad bike/ATV to a personal watercraft. It can attain a top speed of 72 km/h (45 mph) on both land and water. The Quadski uses a marine jet propulsion system as well as wheel retraction, allowing it to transition between land and water.

The Quadski, developed and manufactured by a team based in Detroit, shares several features with the Gibbs Aquada. It is powered by a marinised version of BMW Motorrad's 1.3-litre engine from the K1300S, producing 100 kW (140 PS). However, on land, the power is reduced to approximately 60 kW (82 PS). To switch to water mode, the driver presses a button that retracts the wheels into the vehicle's body and disconnects them from the drive train. In water, the Quadski uses a stone guard-protected intake to draw in water, which is then propelled by an engine-driven impeller through stator blades and a nozzle. Steering is controlled by a nozzle at the rear, directed via the handlebars.

The Quadski can travel for about two hours on water and has a range of approximately 600 kilometres (370 miles) on land.

About 1,000 Quadskis were produced in Michigan between 2012 and 2016, when production ceased. The vehicle is no longer manufactured by Gibbs or under any official licence. A Chinese company, Hison, has attempted to copy the Quadski, but their version uses images of the actual Quadski in marketing materials and lacks strong evidence of functioning as a true amphibian vehicle and is legally questionable.

Official Quadski parts and technical support are supplied by Gibbs Amphibians in New Zealand.

== Appearance on Top Gear ==
A Quadski was used in a 2014 episode of British motoring show Top Gear, when Jeremy Clarkson raced it across Lake Como against an Alfa Romeo 4C driven by co-host Richard Hammond. Despite arriving at the finish line first, Clarkson proceeded to concede the race to the Alfa.

== See also ==
- Amphicar (1961)
- Gibbs Aquada (2004)
- Gibbs Humdinga (2012)
- Iguana Yachts (2012)
- WaterCar
- All-terrain vehicle (ATV)
- Amphibious ATV (AATV)
