= Panther (amphibious vehicle) =

Amphibious vehicle

WaterCar Panther
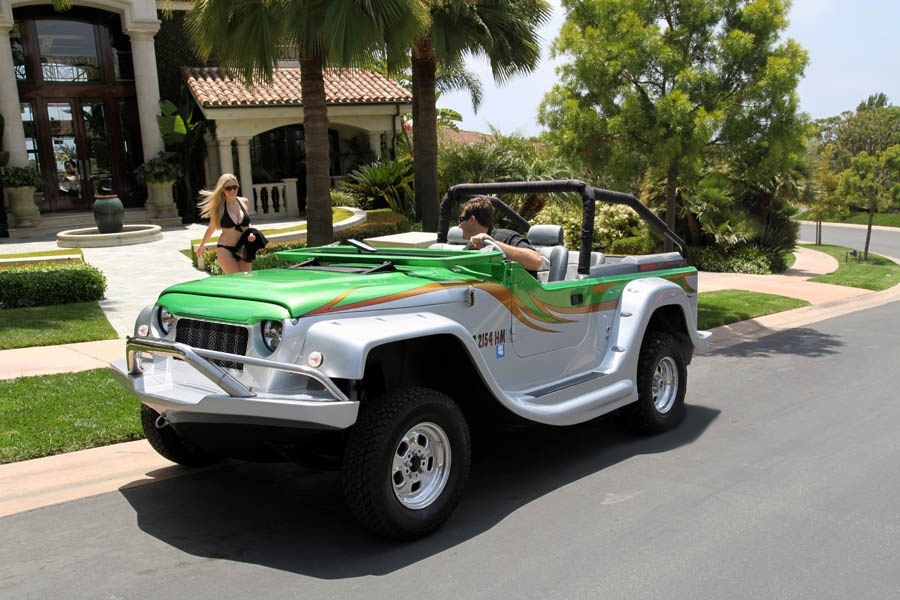
- WaterCar Panther on Street in Newport, CA.

Overview
- Manufacturer: WaterCar
- Production: 2013-present
- Assembly: Fountain Valley, California, United States
- Designer: David March

Body and chassis
- Class: Compact SUV, Convertible, Boat, Amphibious automobile
- Body style: 2-door SUV, 2-door convertible, 2-door boat
- Layout: Rear engine, Rear-wheel drive

Powertrain
- Engine: 3.7L (3,664 cc) 24 valve SOHC V6 VTEC gasoline engine

Dimensions
- Curb weight: 2,950 pounds (1,340 kg)

The WaterCar Panther is a commercial amphibious car manufactured by California-based WaterCar. The Panther entered production in 2013. It was introduced in 2013 after 14 years of development by founder Dave March. It is currently being produced in Fountain Valley, California.

== Overview ==
The WaterCar Panther design is solely based on a Jeep compact SUV. The vehicle is constructed from lightweight steel for the chassis and fiberglass for the body. The WaterCar Panther has a top speed of 85 miles per hour (137 km/h) on land and 45 miles per hour (72 km/h) on the water. The Panther has three trim levels, with the top model equipped with a 3.7L (3,664 cc) 24 valve SOHC V6 VTEC engine which produces 305 HP similar to the second generation Acura MDX SUV.

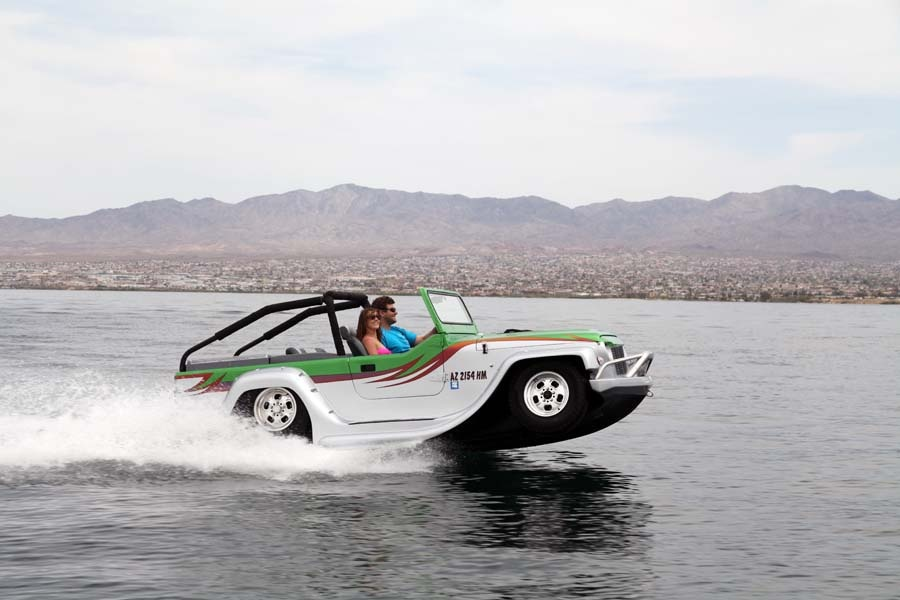
WaterCar Panther driving at Lake Havasu, AZ.

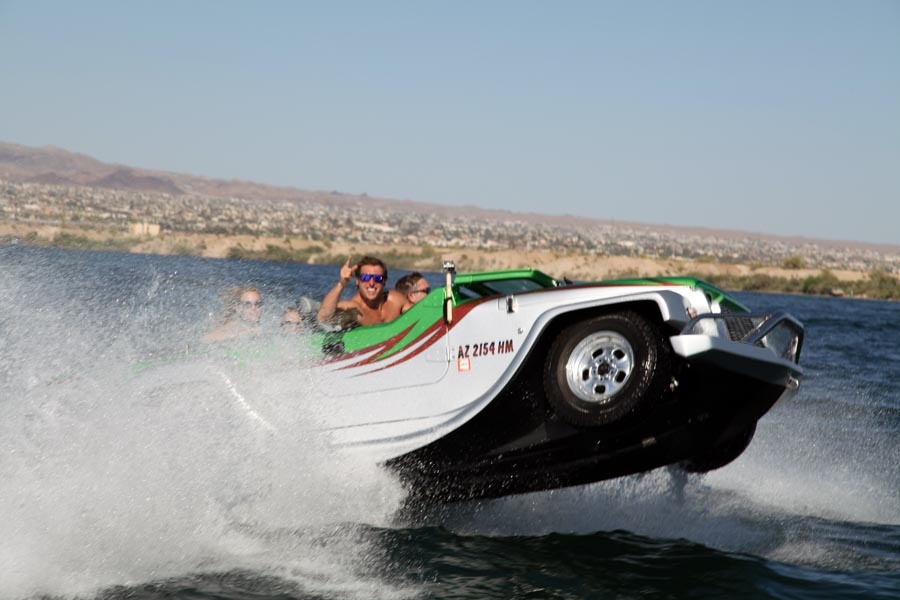
Water Car Panther driving at High Speeds on Lake Havasu, AZ.
