= Fountain Valley BodyWorks =

Auto body shop in Orange County, California

- Industry: Manufacturing
- Founded: 1975
- Headquarters: U.S.

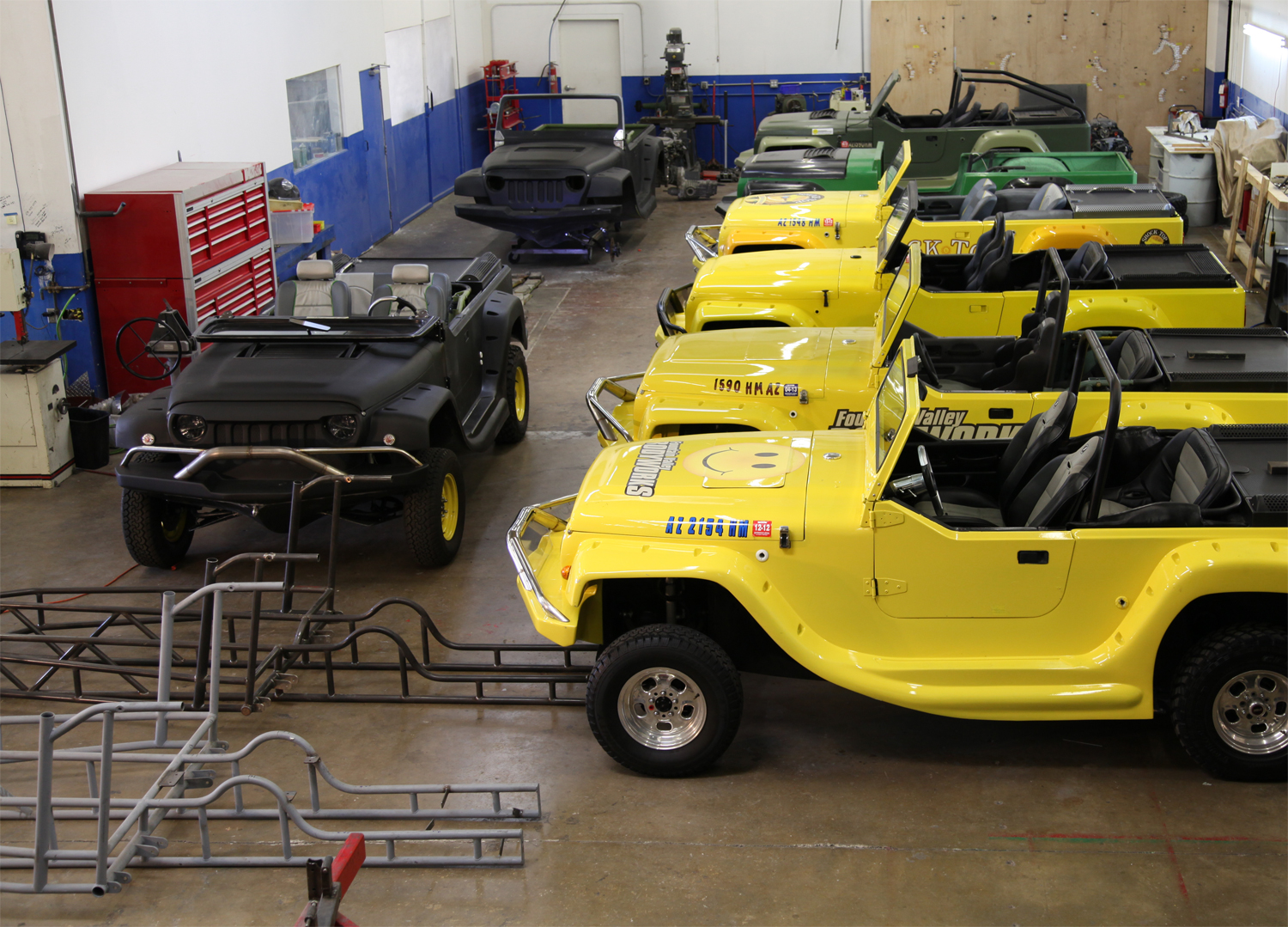
WaterCar's at Fountain Valley BodyWorks - Located in Fountain Valley, CA.

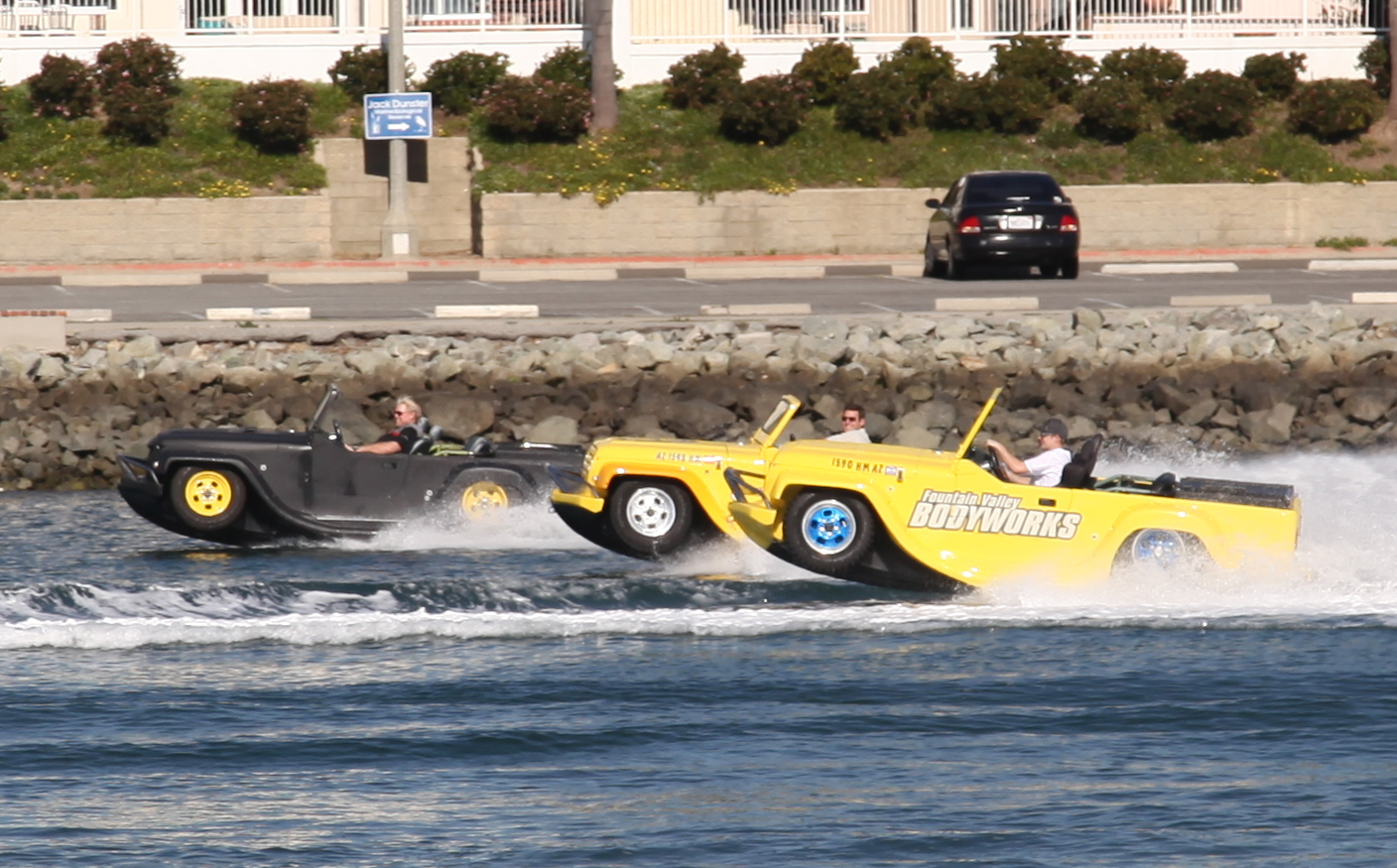
Fountain Valley Body Works' WaterCars in Action

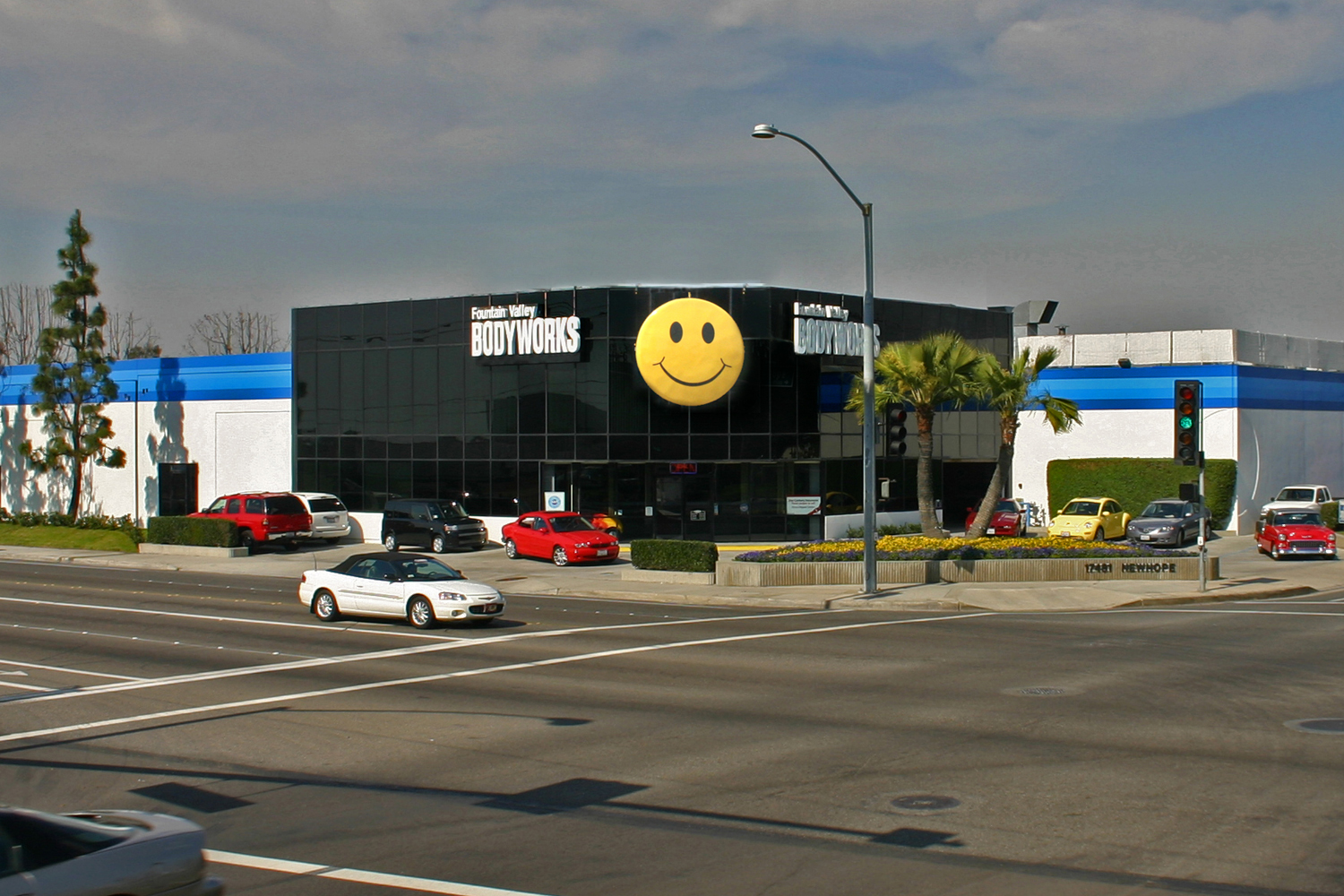
15-foot smiley face on front of Collision Shop

Fountain Valley BodyWorks is an auto body and collision repair shop located in Fountain Valley, California. The bodyshop is responsible for building The World's Fastest Amphibious Vehicle, as certified by the Guinness World Record, and serves as the headquarters of amphibious car manufacturer Watercar. The shop was founded in 1975 by Dave March.

== Makers of WaterCar ==
Using the technology and technicians from his bodyshop, March has produced three working amphibious vehicle prototypes, as well as one commercial vehicle from his bodyshop headquarters. In 2010, March and Fountain Valley Bodyworks set the Guinness World Record for The World's Fastest Amphibious Vehicle with their Python Prototype, achieving speeds of 204 km/hour (127 mph) on land, and 96 km/hour (60 mph; 52 knots) on water. In June 2013, The Panther became the first commercial vehicle released by WaterCar and Fountain Valley BodyWorks.

== Company Details ==
Fountain Valley BodyWorks first opened in 1975 and has two locations in Southern California: An Express Shop (25,000 square feet), and a Collision Repair Center (50,000 square feet). Since 1999, March has produced all four amphibious models (Amphibious Corvette, The Python, The Gator, and The Panther) from his body shop facilities in Fountain Valley, California.

== Advertising ==
Locally, the body shop is well known for maintaining a 15-foot smiley face on the front of their building, which the shop decorates during the various holiday seasons.
