= Top Gear series 21 =

Top Gear
- Series 21
- Promotional poster
- Starring: Jeremy Clarkson; Richard Hammond; James May; The Stig
- No. of episodes: 7

Release
- Original network: BBC Two
- Original release: 2 February – 16 March 2014

Series chronology
- ← Previous; Series 20 Next → Series 22

Series 21 of Top Gear, a British motoring magazine and factual television programme, was broadcast in the United Kingdom on BBC Two during 2014, consisting of five episodes between 2 February and 2 March; production on the series was confirmed via Twitter in 2013, with a teaser trailer released on the BBC's YouTube channel in January 2014. This series' highlights included the presenters looking back at hatchbacks that were available during their youth, a look at the British military vehicles used in Afghanistan, and a road trip across Ukraine that included a visit to Chernobyl.

The series was followed by a two-part series filmed in Myanmar and focusing on the presenters travelling the across the country in lorries, which was titled "Burma Special", and aired on 9–16 March 2014. The special's second part drew criticism of racism over a comment made by Jeremy Clarkson, which raised questions on his future with the BBC because of the controversies he was creating.

This was the penultimate series featuring Clarkson, as well as Richard Hammond, James May and producer, Andy Wilman, since the former was later dismissed, following the conclusion of the succeeding 22nd series and went to on co-host the Amazon Prime Video series The Grand Tour, which ran from 2016-2024, alongside other, successful projects for Amazon.

== Production ==
Confirmation that filming of Series 21 was made on 16 September 2013 via a tweet made on Jeremy Clarkson's Twitter account, which confirmed the two part special was being filmed on 20 October later that year. A teaser trailer for the new series was released on the BBC's YouTube channel, and across BBC channels on 17 January 2014.

== Episodes ==
No. overall	No. in series	Reviews	Features/challenges	Guest(s)	Original release date	UK viewers (millions)
161	1	None	Proving that the hot hatchbacks of the presenters' youth were better than their modern equivalents: (Volkswagen Golf Mk2 GTI • Vauxhall Nova SRi • Ford Fiesta XR2i • 2S1 Gvozdika)	Hugh Bonneville	2 February 2014	6.12
In an attempt to prove that modern hot hatchbacks are not as good as those from the presenters' youths, each of the trio are told to buy a classic hot hatchback they liked very much and prepare them for a series of challenges—Clarkson figures his Volkswagen Golf Mk2 GTI will be a good hatchback, May expects his Ford Fiesta XR2i not to let them down, and Hammond shows that his Vauxhall Nova SRi will do well. In their efforts to prove their point, the trio attempt to set a fast time on the Shelsley Walsh Hill Climb that is better than the one set by Teenage Stig and his SEAT Ibiza Cupra, give their cars a factory fresh look, drive fast in a supermarket circuit without breaking stuff (using the set of Trollied), play a number of car-related games that wouldn't be legal in the modern age, and then see who can outlast a pursuit in an abandoned army base by their rival colleagues utilising the TGPD's (Top Gear Police Department) selection of vehicles. Meanwhile, Hugh Bonneville from Downton Abbey is the latest star to drive the Astra.
162	2	Alfa Romeo 4C • McLaren P1	Alfa Romeo 4C vs Gibbs Quadski • May visits Camp Bastion in Afghanistan	Tom Hiddleston	9 February 2014	6.97
Hammond heads to the shores of Lake Como in Italy to test drive the new Alfa Romeo 4C, but soon finds himself seeing if the car can reach a hotel on the other side of the lake, faster than Clarkson can when he tries to beat him on a Gibbs Quadski, that has one advantage—it can convert to travelling over water. Elsewhere, Clarkson travels to Belgium to try out the hybrid powered McLaren P1 and puts it through its paces on the streets of Bruges and the Circuit de Spa-Francorchamps, while May visits Camp Bastion in Afghanistan to oversee the operation to bring back the military vehicles that British Forces used, including a look at some of the vehicles that were developed to cope with the dangerous situations that were faced, and on the test track is Tom Hiddleston, as he handles the Astra on a very wet track.
163	3	Zenvo ST1	Trip through Ukraine in three-cylinder city cars: (Volkswagen Up! • Ford Fiesta • Dacia Sandero)	James Blunt	16 February 2014	6.87
The trio head out for a road trip across Ukraine in three small-engined hatchbacks—Hammond opts for the Ford Fiesta, Clarkson chooses the Volkswagen Up!, and May goes for the Dacia Sandero. Beginning at the Livadia Palace on the Crimean Peninsula, the presenters engage in a series of challenges to test their rides, culminating in the group attempting to run out of fuel before reaching Pripyat, where they face having to drive through the abandoned city and its contaminated pockets of radiation. Elsewhere, Clarkson reflects on Denmark's contribution to motoring with the Zenvo STI, and James Blunt sees how fast he was on the track in the Astra.
164	4	Caterham 7 160 • Caterham 7 620R • Alfa Romeo Disco Volante by Touring • Mercedes Benz G63 AMG 6x6	Proving that cars are better than motorbikes	Jack Whitehall	23 February 2014	6.53
Clarkson heads to the Pordoi Pass in northern Italy, to drive along it in the new Alfa Romeo 8C-based Touring Disco Volante, the first coach built car to be made since the 1930s. Meanwhile, Hammond travels to the United Arab Emirates in order to test out the six-wheeled Mercedes Benz G63 AMG 6x6 in a number of aspects such as driving over sand dunes, while May hits the track to try out several new cars from Caterham—the Caterham 620R, the 160, and the Caterham's Aeroseven Concept. First time driver Jack Whitehall sees if he was fast when he did his lap in the Astra. Finally, Clarkson attempts to prove that cars were better than motorbikes by attempting to pull a table cloth with a Nissan GT-R.
165	5	BMW M135i • VW Golf GTI Mk7 • Porsche 918 Spyder	Making a public information film on cycle safety	Aaron Paul	2 March 2014	5.64
Clarkson reviews two new German hot hatchbacks on the track—the BMW M135i, and the VW Golf GTI Mk7 (ignoring the Mercedes A45 AMG)—while Hammond heads to the Yas Marina Circuit to review Porsche's new hybrid supercar, the 918 Spyder. Elsewhere, Clarkson and May try to create a public information film to promote the safety of cyclists in London, while Aaron Paul talked about his role in Breaking Bad and in the film Need for Speed, before finding out how he did when he went around the track in the Reasonably Priced Car.
166	6	N/A – Burma Special Part 1	Build a bridge over the River Kwai: (Isuzu TX • Isuzu TX • Hino FB110)	None	9 March 2014	6.29
In a two-part special, the three presenters travel to the across Burma in three second-hand lorries—Clarkson in an Isuzu TX, Hammond in a modified Isuzu TX, and May in a Hino FB110—in order to reach Thailand and build a bridge across the River Kwai. In the first part, the trio endure a long trip to the country's new capital in Naypyidaw and discover how empty its streets are, modify their lorries to provide them sleeping quarters on their journey, visit villages off the road, before having to endure difficulties in finding fuel for their lorries.
167	7	N/A – Burma Special Part 2	Build a bridge over the River Kwai: (Isuzu TX • Isuzu TX • Hino FB110)	None	16 March 2014	7.01
The trio continue on their trip across Burma to reach Thailand and the River Kwai. In the second part, the trio enter the Shan State and discover how life is in a region that has seen extensive conflicts, travel a lone road across beautiful mountain scenery, before eventually arriving at the wrong river—the River Kok. Despite this mishap, the presenters proceed with their work to make a bridge across the river regardless, learning that their journey is only complete when the bridge is built, and all three lorries have crossed it to the other side. Note: In homage to Sir Alec Guinness, all credited presenters and crew members had their first names replaced with "Sir Alec", while the closing credits were played out with music from the film "Kelly's Heroes".

== Criticism ==
In the second part of the Burma Special, a scene showing the presenters looking over their completed bridge over the Kok River, featured a moment in which a native of the area is crossing the bridge as Jeremy Clarkson says to Richard Hammond about their finished work - "That is a proud moment, but there's a slope on it." Following the broadcast of the second part, complaints of racism arose in regard to the comment, primarily citing that "slope" was a derogatory term for an Asian, leading to Top Gear and Andy Wilman, the show's executive producer, apologising for any offence caused by it in late April 2014, while subsequently cutting the scene from future repeats of the special. In a statement by Wilman to the media, the executive producer said:

"When we used the word slope in the recent Top Gear Burma Special it was a light-hearted word play joke referencing both the build quality of the bridge and the local Asian man who was crossing it. We were not aware at the time, and it has subsequently been brought to our attention, that the word slope is considered by some to be offensive and although it might not be widely recognised in the UK, we appreciate that it can be considered offensive to some here and overseas, for example in Australia and the USA. If we had known that at the time we would not have broadcast the word in this context and regret any offence caused."

However, a few months later, British broadcasting regulator Ofcom, which investigated the complaints of racism in regard to the comment, ruled that both the BBC and Top Gear had breached broadcasting rules for using offensive language, stating that the use of the term was both offensive and racist, that the explanation of its context for the broadcast could not be justified, and that the broadcaster had missed opportunities during filming and post-production to "check whether the word had the potential to offend viewers". Following the incident, and emergence of video evidence of an unaired take during filming for Series 19, in which he was shown to mumble another racist term, the BBC chose to give Jeremy Clarkson a final warning in regard to his behaviour, amidst calls by many public figures for him to be fired.
