= Cool Amphibious Manufacturers International =

American amphibious vehicle manufacturer

Cool Amphibious Manufacturers International (CAMI) is an amphibious vehicle manufacturer based in Bluffton, South Carolina, in the United States. They have many different types of amphibious vehicles, including the Hydra Terra, an amphibious bus filled with foam. CAMI claims that the bus is "unsinkable and safer" than the DUKW (World War II amphibious assault vehicles), LARCs (Vietnam War era assault vehicles), and the British FV620 Stalwart amphibious load carrier. The Hydra Terra vehicle is currently used by major cities around the world in what are termed Splash, or Duck Tours. Some of the international cities offering these tours include Boston, Dublin and Belfast.

== Models ==
- Amphibious Responder - an amphibious first-responding search and rescue vehicle
- H20EX – a modified, amphibious Ford Explorer.
- Hydra Spyder – an amphibious convertible sports car.
- Hydra Terra – a modern amphibious tour bus.
- Terra Max – an amphibious SUV.
- Terra Wind – a luxury amphibious Coach/houseboat hybrid motor home.
- Biotrike – the company's first non-amphibious vehicle. The biotrike is a plug-in hybrid 3-wheeler.
