= Hydra Spyder =

The Hydra Spyder is an open-top amphibious sportscar which began production in 2006. It is produced and marketed by Cool Amphibious Manufacturers International, LLC. The vehicle can seat four people and has a 500 hp engine in the standard model making it strong enough to pull water skiers. The company claims the vehicle is unsinkable as all cavities in its "hull" are packed with flotation foam.

On land the car is driven normally, and when piloted into a body of water, the simple usage of a toggle button on the dashboard will enable the car's aquatic mode. The wheels then "tuck" into the body of the car, simultaneously switching to a different engine, ready to power the car on water.

On land, the 3,300 lb (1,500 kg) vehicle gets 16-18 miles per gallon, and can easily be fitted to take an ethanol mix instead of gasoline.

Notable competitors include the Gibbs Aquada, which started development in 2003.
