= Top Gear series 20 =

Top Gear
- Series 20
- Promotional poster
- Starring: Jeremy Clarkson; Richard Hammond; James May; The Stig
- No. of episodes: 6

Release
- Original network: BBC Two
- Original release: 30 June – 4 August 2013

Series chronology
- ← Previous; Series 19 Next → Series 21

Series 20 of Top Gear, a British motoring magazine and factual television programme, was broadcast in the United Kingdom on BBC Two during 2013, consisting of six episodes between 30 June and 4 August. Following the previous series, the programme replaced the Kia Cee'd with the Vauxhall Astra Tech Line as its "Reasonably Priced Car", effectively wiping the Celebrity Lap Board clean for new times. This series' highlights included a race between a car and a yacht around New Zealand, a budget convertible trip across Spain, the presenters creating a hovercraft out of a van, and a tribute piece to the British motor industry.

== Episodes ==
No. overall	No. in series	Reviews	Features/challenges	Guest(s)	Original release date	UK viewers (millions)
155	1	Hot hatchbacks: (Renaultsport Clio 200 • Peugeot 208 GTi • Ford Fiesta ST)	AC45 Racing Yacht vs Toyota Corolla • Introduction of the new Reasonably Priced Car: Vauxhall Astra	Brian Johnson • Charles Dance • Warwick Davis • Joss Stone • Jimmy Carr • David Haye • Rachel Riley • Mike Rutherford • Sir Ben Ainslie	30 June 2013	5.55
Clarkson travels to New Zealand to see if a Toyota Auris can get from the northern tip of the Coromandel Peninsula to the northern tip of the North Island faster than the America's Cup-winning AC45 sailing boat, crewed by May, Olympic gold medallist Sir Ben Ainslie and a number of members from Oracle Team USA. Meanwhile, Hammond reviews three hot hatchbacks on the track – the Peugeot 208 GTi, the Renaultsport Clio 200, and the Ford Fiesta ST – to see which is the best to drive. Finally, the Kia Cee'd has been retired, and in its place is a Vauxhall Astra Tech Line, leading Hammond and Clarkson to hosting a party and inviting celebrities to join it and see if they can get a fast time in the Astra.
156	2	Ferrari F12 Berlinetta • BAC Mono	Best taxi • Tribute to BBC Television Centre	Ron Howard	7 July 2013	5.31
Hammond once again sees if motorsport and a handful of touring car drivers can help solve the problem of which taxi in the world is the best. The contenders for this "test" are: the Hackney carriage from Britain, a Volkswagen Beetle taxi from Mexico, the Ford Crown Victoria yellow cab from America, a Hindustan Ambassador taxi from India, a Mercedes-Benz E-Class taxi from Germany, a Toyota Hiace taxi from South Africa, and a Lincoln Town Car stretch limo-taxi from Russia. Meanwhile, Clarkson sees how good the BAC Mono is at the track and assesses the usage of the Ferrari F12 Berlinetta in Hertfordshire, May pays tribute to the closed down BBC Television Centre by staging a race within the building between a duo of parkour runners and motorcycle champion Dougie Lampkin, and the director of Rush, Ron Howard, talks about the background of his film before he finds out how fast he was in the reasonably priced car.
157	3	None	Spanish road trip in "budget" convertibles: (McLaren MP4-12C Spider • Ferrari 458 Spider • Audi R8 V10 Spyder)	Benedict Cumberbatch	14 July 2013	4.83
The trio head for Spain, for a road trip with three new "budget convertibles" – Hammond in the Ferrari 458 Spider, Clarkson in the McLaren MP4-12C Spider, and May in the Audi R8 V10 Spyder. On their trip across the country, the trio test their cars at being inconspicuous, how noisy they are, travel along a mountain road in the Sierra Nevada mountain range, use the disused Ciudad Real Central Airport for speed test and drag race, before concluding their journey by making a street circuit in an abandoned housing project in Madrid to beat a lap time by a Jaguar XKR-S. Elsewhere, Benedict Cumberbatch sees how he fared in the new reasonably priced car.
158	4	Mercedes SLS AMG Black Series • Mercedes SLS AMG Electric Drive	Ford Transit hovervan	Hugh Jackman	21 July 2013	5.36
The boys decide to create a makeshift hovercraft out of a Ford Transit van, to see if a vehicle could be made to adapt to flooding. After their initial design sinks, the presenters redesign it and put their finished creation, the "Hovervan MK II", through the challenge of travelling along the River Avon in Warwickshire, getting it from Stratford-upon-Avon to Tewkesbury, with their ambitious idea causing chaos along the way. Elsewhere, at the track, Clarkson compares the petrol-powered Mercedes SLS AMG Black Series against the electric-powered Mercedes SLS AMG Electric Drive, and actor Hugh Jackman talks about his film The Wolverine and an embarrassing experience in Japan, while seeing how he fared in the reasonably priced car.
159	5	Porsche 911 Carrera S • Singer 911 • Lamborghini Aventador Roadster • Lamborghini Sesto Elemento	Best crossovers for caravanners: (Mazda CX-5 • Volkswagen Tiguan)	Steven Tyler	28 July 2013	5.29
Clarkson and May find themselves forced by the producers to review different CUVs to find one that would be best for a caravanner – eventually settling on the Mazda CX-5 for Clarkson and the Volkswagen Tiguan for May. They put them through some "pointless" tests, before seeing who can reach a caravan site first while towing a caravan with their CUV, with the loser forced to spend the night at the site within their caravan. Meanwhile, Hammond tests out the new Lamborghini Aventador Roadster and the Lamborghini Sesto Elemento around the Imola racetrack in Italy, May takes a look at the new Porsche 911 Carrera S and looks at a 911 tribute car built by Californian tuner Singer at the Track, and Aerosmith lead singer Steven Tyler takes his turn to drive fast in the Astra.
160	6	Range Rover Sport • New Routemaster • Jaguar F-Type	Tribute to British automobile manufacturing	Mark Webber	4 August 2013	5.49
Hammond tests out the next generation of Range Rover Sport to see if it's worthy to bear the "Sport" name, while May sees if the New Routemaster bus can be as good to use as a car. Meanwhile, Clarkson takes a look at the Jaguar F-Type, and F1 driver Mark Webber sees how fast he is in the Liana around the test track. The episode concludes with the presenters finding out how much contribution Britain has made to motoring, and discovering the country's impact in motor research, motorsport, Formula 1, and British-made equipment exported around the world, before inviting British motor manufacturers to bring their creations for a special meet on The Mall in London. Note: The closing credits play out to panning shots of the motoring meet in London, with the programme's theme tune replaced with a musical piece combining Elgar's "Nimrod" and "Pomp and Circumstance" (aka "Land of Hope and Glory").
