= Amphibious automobile =

Vehicle viable on land and on/under water

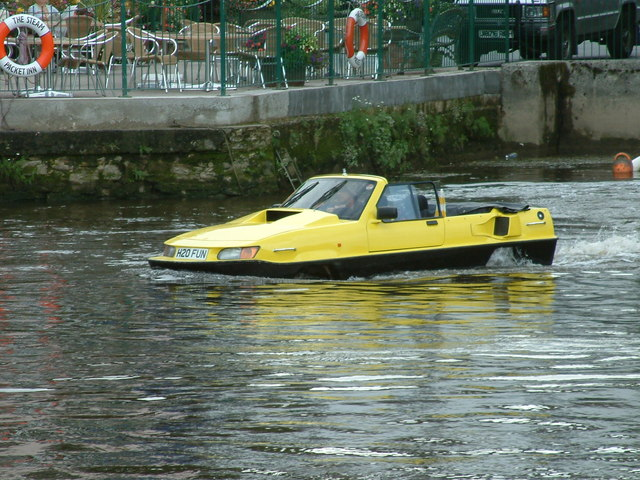
Totnes, A Car on the River Dart

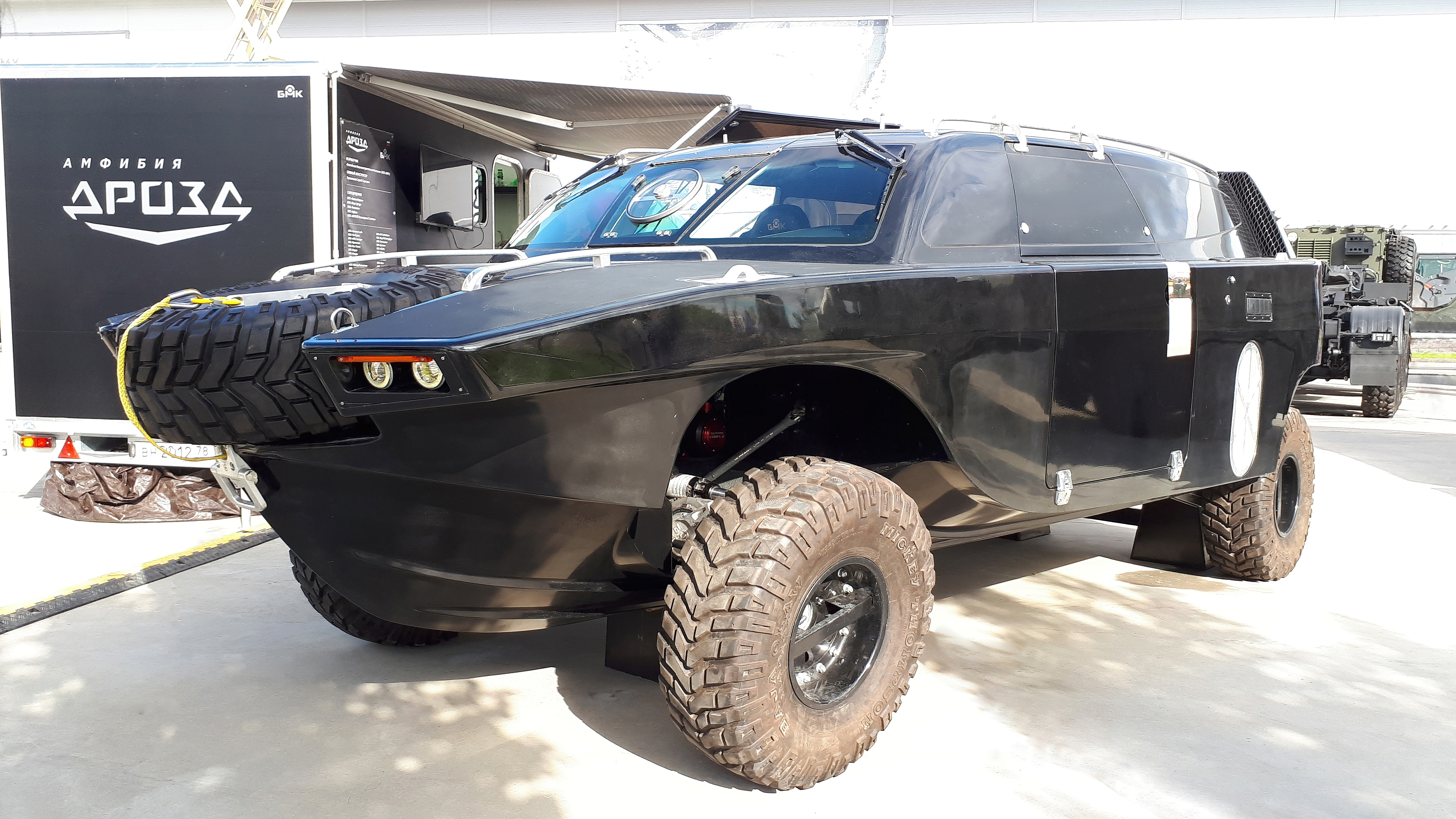
"Drozd" during the "Armiya 2020" exhibition.

An amphibious automobile, also known as an amphibian, is an automobile that is a means of transport viable on land as well as on or under water. They are unarmored for civilian use.

== ATVs ==
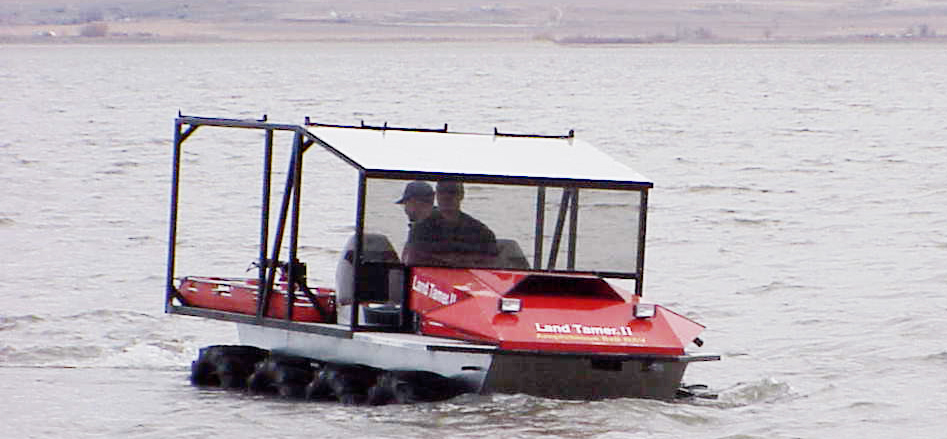
Land Tamer amphibious 8×8 remote access vehicle

Amongst the smallest non air-cushioned amphibious vehicles are amphibious ATVs (all-terrain vehicles). These saw significant popularity in North America during the 1960s and early 1970s. Typically an amphibious ATV (AATV) is a small, lightweight, off-highway vehicle, constructed from an integral hard plastic or fibreglass bodytub, fitted with six (sometimes eight) driven wheels, with low pressure, balloon tires. With no suspension (other than what the tires offer) and no steering wheels, directional control is accomplished through skid-steering – just as on a tracked vehicle – either by braking the wheels on the side where you want to turn, or by applying more throttle to the wheels on the opposite side. Most contemporary designs use garden tractor type engines, that will provide roughly 25 mph or 40 km/h top speed on land.

Constructed this way, an AATV will float with ample freeboard and is capable of traversing swamps, ponds and streams as well as dry land. On land these units have high grip and great off-road ability, that can be further enhanced with an optional set of tracks that can be mounted directly onto the wheels. Although the spinning action of the tires is enough to propel the vehicle through the water – albeit slowly – outboard motors can be added for extended water use.

In October 2013, Gibbs Amphibians introduced the Quadski, the first amphibious vehicle capable of traveling 45 mph or 72 km/h on land or water. The Quadski was developed using Gibbs' High Speed Amphibian technology, which Gibbs originally developed for the Aquada, an amphibious car, which the company has still not produced because of regulatory issues.

== Cars ==
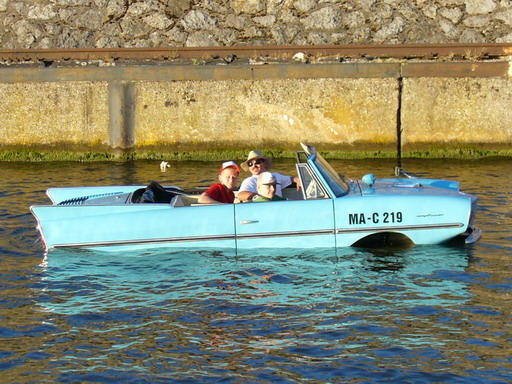
Amphicar

Amphibious automobiles have been conceived from c. 1900, however the Second World War significantly stimulated their development. Two of the most significant amphibious cars to date were developed during World War II. The most proliferous was Nazi Germany's Schwimmwagen, a small jeep-like 4x4 vehicle designed by the Porsche engineering firm in 1942 and widely used in World War II. The amphibious bodywork was designed by Erwin Komenda, the firm's body construction designer, using the engine and drive train of the Kübelwagen. An amphibious version of the Willys MB jeep, the Ford GPA or 'Seep' (short for Sea jeep) was developed during World War II as well. A specially modified GPA, called Half-Safe, was driven and sailed around the world by Australian Ben Carlin in the 1950s.

One of the most capable post-war amphibious off-roaders was the German Amphi-Ranger, that featured a hull made of seawater-resistant AlMg2 aluminium alloy. Extensively engineered, this costly vehicle was proven seaworthy at a Gale force 10 storm off the North Sea coast (Pohl, 1998). Only about 100 were built – those who own one have found it capable of crossing the English Channel almost effortlessly.

Purely recreational amphibian cars include the 1960s Amphicar and the contemporary Gibbs Aquada. With almost 4,000 pieces built, the Amphicar is still the most successfully produced civilian amphibious car to date. The Gibbs Aquada stands out due to its capability of high speed planing on water. Gibbs built fifty Aquadas in the early 2000s after it was developed by a team assembled by founder Alan Gibbs before the company's engine supplier, Rover, was unable to continue providing engines. Gibbs and new partner Neil Jenkins reconstituted the company and are now seeking U.S. regulatory approval for the Aquada Other amphibious cars include the US Hydra Spyder and the Spira4u. Not all were successful with the 1979 Herzog Conte Schwimmwagen failing to get past the prototype and into production. Some new energy vehicles such as Yangwang U8, Zongheng G700, Zongheng G900 and Geely Galaxy Cruiser 700 have amphibious ability.

== See also ==
- Amphibious aircraft
- Amphibious vehicle
- Amphicar
- Flying car
- Unmanned aerial vehicle
- Volkswagen Schwimmwagen
