= Paul Walton =

British motoring journalist and photographer

Paul Walton is a British motoring journalist and photographer.

He started his career in 1999, working for Classic Cars magazine before moving to BBC Top Gear magazine in 2002.

Highlights during his time at the two magazines included driving a twin-engined Citroën 2CV Sahara in the Israeli desert, a Ferrari 250 SWB on a closed off section of San Marino, driving a BMW 325i to Spain so it could be assessed by the then WilliamsF1 test driver Marc Gené, and taking a Gibbs Aquada amphibious car for a spin around Monte Carlo's harbour during the Monaco Grand Prix.

He turned freelance in 2005, but kept his Top Gear links by editing BBC's Top Gear Test Drive Directory (a bi monthly car buyers guide), a post he held until the magazine was stopped in 2011. During this time, he also supplied features for many specialist motoring titles, including the unique Jaguar XK150 'Tow Car' estate, the one-off Jensen CV8 Sedanca (a factory made, half convertible), an early Jaguar XJ220 prototype, a Zagato Zele, a rare electric city car made by the Italian coachbuilder, and the Minissima, a William Towns designed concept.

In January 2012, he was appointed Editor of Jaguar World Monthly, an independent magazine about the British marque. In the ten years he was in charge, Paul drove many famous models including the Jaguar D-type that finished second at the 1957 24 Hours of Le Mans, the unique Jaguar XJ13, the first and last E-type and many more.

In mid 2022 he became Editor of Aston Martin Driver, a bimonthly publication about Aston Martin, while continuing to work for Jaguar World plus several other titles.

Although born in Darlington and brought up in North Yorkshire, Walton currently lives in East Anglia.
