= Top Gear series 22 =

Top Gear
- Series 22
- Promotional poster
- Starring: Jeremy Clarkson; Richard Hammond; James May; The Stig
- No. of episodes: 8

Release
- Original network: BBC Two
- Original release: 27 December 2014 – 28 June 2015

Series chronology
- ← Previous; Series 21 Next → Series 23

Series 22 of Top Gear, a British motoring magazine and factual television programme, was broadcast on BBC Two during 2015, consisting of eight episodes - seven of these were aired between 25 January and 8 March, while the eighth was aired on 28 June following a disruption in production; two additional episodes were planned but never produced. The series was preceded by a two-part special focused on the presenters conducting a road trip across Argentina, titled Top Gear: Patagonia Special, and aired during 2014 on 27–28 December. This series' highlights included the presenters conducting a race across St. Petersburg, creating home-made ambulances, a recreation of a famous Land Rover Defender advert, and a road trip across Australia in GT cars.

This series was the final to feature Jeremy Clarkson, Richard Hammond and James May as the programme's presenters, and Andy Wilman as its executive producer, after an incident during production of the twenty-second series, involving accusations of physical and verbal abuse, led to the BBC dismissing Clarkson from the programme. The BBC's investigation into the accusations suspended production after the seventh episode, with his fellow presenters resigning in April 2015, however Hammond, May and Wilman agreed to produce a final episode featuring two films that were planned to be shown before production was disrupted. The two-part special that had preceded this series also drew international attention when the presenters faced threats during filming after Patagonian residents claimed one of the presenters' cars' number plates carried a deliberate reference to the Falklands War.

To mark the end of the trio's era of presenting Top Gear, the BBC produced a two-part compilation special, titled Top Gear: From A-Z, which aired on 26–30 December 2015, and was narrated by comedian John Bishop. The special featured the best moments of the past twenty-two series of the programme, and included comments by a number of celebrities and sporting personalities about the presenters' work.

== Production ==
News that production of the series was being planned was hinted by Clarkson on Twitter on 29 April 2014, before he later confirmed on 7 July that year that he was going to Morocco to start filming for the show, with a media outlet in Australia further revealing on 24 October and 29 October that the trio were filming within the country's Northern Territory.

While Wilman had stated in the January 2015 issue of Top Gear Magazine (issue #265) that Series 22 was to contain 10 episodes in its broadcast, only seven were actually aired; the series abruptly ended after the seventh episode in the wake of Clarkson's suspension, with the BBC opting to pull the last three episodes from its schedule until its investigations on the presenter's assault was completed. Following their decision not to renew Clarkson's contract, the Director General Tony Hall announced that the broadcaster intended to show the three pulled episodes after it had debated on how to do so, although all that was left for use was two filmed vehicle challenges. Furthermore, Hammond and May, along with Wilman, had announced their decisions not to return to the show, leading to a re-think on the matter. After debating how to end the series, the BBC decided to air the two completed films as part of an extended special episode, with Hammond, May and Wilman asked to postpone their departures from the show to help with producing and hosting it; the official website of Top Gear hinted on 8 June 2015 at this having happened by announcing that the filmed segments were to be shown later that year; it was not until a week later, on 15 June, that the BBC officially confirmed that the segments had been allocated to a 75-minute special that was under production. Production of the episode led to studio segments being filmed, though no audience was invited to be at the show's studio at Dunsfold on the day of filming. The final episode of the series was eventually scheduled and aired on 28 June.

== Episodes ==
No. overall	No. in series	Reviews	Features/challenges	Guest(s)	Original release date	UK viewers (millions)
168	-	N/A – Patagonia Special	Drive from Bariloche to Ushuaia: (Porsche 928 GT • Lotus Esprit V8 • Ford Mustang Mach 1)	None	27 December 2014	7.21
In a two-part special, the presenters pay tribute to the 60th anniversary of the small-block V8 engine, by travelling across Argentina in three V8-powered cars - Clarkson drives a Porsche 928 GT, Hammond drives 1971 Ford Mustang Mach 1, and May drives a Lotus Esprit V8. In the first part, the trio travel towards Butch Cassidy's final resting place, before setting off to reach Ushuaia in Tierra del Fuego, encountering difficult terrain, problematic obstacles, and a route that requires them to head through Chile to be able to head south.
169	-	N/A – Patagonia Special	Drive from Bariloche to Ushuaia: (Porsche 928 GT • Lotus Esprit V8 • Ford Mustang Mach 1)	None	28 December 2014	7.38
The trio continue heading southwards for Ushuaia, as they make their way through Chile. In the second part, the presenters have fun on a dirt-track recreation of the Imola racetrack, collect supplies for a planned car football match, before enduring rough terrain and icy mountains to get to their destination. However, when they arrive, the group quickly find themselves facing a difficult time with the locals, and recall how badly things went, and how their film coped trying to get back to Chile against dangerous mobs of protestors. Notes: In homage to Butch Cassidy, all credited crew members and presenters have their first names replaced with "Robert Leroy", while the closing credits are played out with a different theme tune. In addition James May was injured during filming for this episode suffered three cracked ribs during filming. He sustained the injuries trying to mount a horse.
170	1	Lamborghini Huracán • Renault Twizy	Race across the urban landscape of St Petersburg	Ed Sheeran	25 January 2015	6.41
To see if the car can reclaim its honour after its loss in the race across London, the trio head to St. Petersburg to see if May, driving a Renault Twizy, can reach the finish line before Hammond can on a £9,000 bicycle, before Clarkson can on a hovercraft, and before The Stig can on public transport. Elsewhere, Hammond tests out the new Lamborghini Huracán on the track, while Ed Sheeran is the latest star to be doing a lap in the Vauxhall Astra Tech Line.
171	2	None	Australian Northern Territory road trip in GT cars: (BMW M6 Gran Coupe • Nissan GT-R • Bentley Continental GT V8S)	Kiefer Sutherland	1 February 2015	6.56
The trio conduct a four-day road trip across the Northern Territory in Australia with three modern Grand-Tourer cars - Hammond in a Bentley Continental GT V8S, May in a Nissan GT-R, and Clarkson in a BMW M6 Gran Coupe. On their journey, beginning in Darwin, the trio test their cars on speed, braking and handling, before facing their final test on a 3.2 million acre (13,000 km^{2}) cattle station of Wave Hill by using their cars to herd cattle. Elsewhere, Kiefer Sutherland sees how good his lap was in the reasonably priced car.
172	3	None	Homemade ambulance challenge: (Porsche 944 Turbo • Ford Scorpio Cardinal • Chevrolet G20)	Daniel Ricciardo	8 February 2015	6.14
The presenters attempt to make their own ambulance to replace the standard model used by the NHS, on a budget of £5,000 - Clarkson bases his on a Porsche 944 Turbo, May converts a Ford Scorpio Cardinal hearse, and Hammond customises a Chevrolet G20 van. The trio soon receive challenges to test their creations on their medical capabilities, which concludes with a race between the three to see who can deliver a patient from an "accident" to a nearby hospital. Meanwhile, Formula One driver, Daniel Ricciardo sees how fast he can be in the Suzuki Liana.
173	4	Mercedes-AMG GT S • BMW M3 • BMW i8	Hammond pays homage to the Land Rover Defender	Margot Robbie • Will Smith	15 February 2015	6.24
Clarkson tests out the new BMW M3 and the new i8 to see which he would drive back home from Whitby, while May heads to the track to see how good the Mercedes-AMG GT S is. Elsewhere, as a tribute to the Land Rover Defender as its production comes to an end, Hammond sees if he can replicate a stunt the car did by heading to the Claerwen dam in Wales and using a Defender to climb to the top of it, while Margot Robbie & Will Smith talk about their roles in film Focus, before seeing who was fastest in the Astra.
174	5	Chevrolet Corvette Stingray • Porsche Cayman GTS • LaFerrari	May and Clarkson look at the weird and wonderful history of Peugeot	Olly Murs	22 February 2015	6.04
Clarkson and May pay homage to one of the most innovative and brilliant car makers, Peugeot, by looking back at some of the items they made before becoming involved with cars, taking a look at some of their great creations, including the Peugeot 504, the 205 T16, and the 205 GTI, and then take a drive as modern Peugeot drivers in a Peugeot 307 CC and a Peugeot 407 to show how bad it was for the car maker to change from making sporty cars to terrible ones. Elsewhere, Hammond reviews the new Chevrolet Corvette Stingray comparing it to the Porsche Cayman GTS, May finds out how good the LaFerrari is against its main rivals, the McLaren P1 and the Porsche 918, while Olly Murs is the latest star in the reasonably priced car.
175	6	Lexus RC F • Lexus LFA	Hammond is dropped into British Columbia, Canada to test a watch with a built-in emergency beacon: (Ford F-150 Hennessey VelociRaptor • Chevrolet Silverado HD)	Gillian Anderson	1 March 2015	6.15
In order to test the effectiveness of a Breitling Emergency watch, Hammond is chosen as the "rescue victim" and dumped on Wolf Mountain in British Columbia, Canada, with an emergency beacon and supplies. His colleagues soon attempt to find him once the beacon is activated, but take their time with two of the best selling pick-up trucks in America that they pick for the job - Clarkson attempts the task in the Hennessey VelociRaptor, a tuned version of the Ford F-150 SVT Raptor, while May selects the Chevrolet Silverado 2500HD Duramax Z71. Meanwhile, Clarkson tests out the new Lexus RC F and the Lexus LFA, while Gillian Anderson is the latest star in the driving seat of the Astra.
176	7	Jaguar F-Type R • Eagle Low Drag GT • Mazda MX-5	May competes in a world rallycross race alongside Tanner Foust (U.S. Top Gear host).	Nicholas Hoult • Tanner Foust	8 March 2015	5.84
May heads to Lydden Hill Race Circuit to participate in the FIA World Rallycross Championship (with a little help from his fellow hosts) and finds himself competing against Top Gear USA host, Tanner Foust. Meanwhile Clarkson heads to the track to look at the beauty of the new Jaguar F-Type R before seeing how it compares to a recreation of a one-off E Type racing prototype - the Eagle Low Drag GT, Hammond heads to Spain to test out the new Mazda MX-5, and Nicholas Hoult talks about his role in the film Mad Max: Fury Road before seeing how he did as the latest star in the Vauxhall Astra.
177	8	None	Find a cheap car that still lives up to the title of classic: (Fiat 124 Spider • Peugeot 304 S Cabriolet • MGB GT) • Living the sports utility vehicle lifestyle for less than £250: (Vauxhall Frontera Sport RS • Mitsubishi Shogun Pinin • Jeep Cherokee)	None	28 June 2015	6.92
Hammond and May host a special episode featuring two films that had been completed prior to the dismissal of Clarkson. In the first film, the pair and Clarkson each try to live as classic car enthusiasts with a particular classic car - Hammond picks a MGB GT, Clarkson chooses a Fiat 124 Sport Spider, and May drives a Peugeot 304 S Cabriolet - testing out their choices, before modifying and improving their cars, and competing against each other to see whose choice is the best. In the second film, the trio see which is the best second-hand 4x4 SUV on a budget of £250 - Clarkson picks a Vauxhall Frontera Sport RS, May chooses a Mitsubishi Shogun Pinin, and Hammond drives a Jeep Cherokee - facing a series of challenges that concludes with a race in which the loser must conduct an awkward after-dinner speech at their destination. Notes: This episode's studio segments were filmed without a studio audience, and featured a model of an elephant in the room symbolising Clarkson's absence. The closing credits are played out in silence. Clarkson provided voiceover work for this episode as it fell under his old contract. Clarkson despite not being present during studio links was still officially credited as a presenter for the episode. In 2022, Richard Hammond revealed that his MGB GT from the classic car segment of this episode had been modified into a car that is intended to be entered into classic car races.

== Criticism and controversy ==
=== Filming of Patagonia Special ===
During 2014, in September and October, filming of the Top Gear special in Argentina was being done by the presenters, Jeremy Clarkson, Richard Hammond, and James May, alongside a crew of 29 people, with the group using three cars for a road trip across the country and its neighbour of Chile. However, controversy arose when an incident occurred during filming, which received extensive coverage by the media in both Britain and Argentina. Whilst the crew and presenters were travelling south to Ushuaia, comments emerged on Twitter which alleged that the number plate "H982 FKL" on the Porsche 928 GT being driven by Clarkson, was a direct reference to the 1982 Falklands War. Upon the comments being seen by one of the film crew, the number plate was substituted with one that read "H1 VAE". However, when the group arrived in Ushuaia in Tierra del Fuego on 2 October, in which they had planned to film in the city for three more days before continuing to Chile, a large protest had formed, consisting of Argentinian veterans of the Falklands War who claimed the group were deliberately referencing the war, despite the change of number plate, forcing the crew and presenters to stay at a hotel while discussions commenced between the producers and representatives of the protesters to calm the tension down. Andy Wilman, executive producer for the show, said on 2 October that "Top Gear production purchased three cars for a forthcoming programme; to suggest that this car was either chosen for its number plate, or that an alternative number plate was substituted for the original is completely untrue." On the same day, Clarkson tweeted "For once, we did nothing wrong." "H982 FKL" has been registered to the Porsche since its manufacture in May 1991. Clarkson later wrote for The Sunday Times that he "had to hide under a bed" due to "a mob howling for his blood".

However, discussions failed to do anything, and with more protesters arriving and the atmosphere turning hostile, local police told the group they could not and would not give them any assistance, leading to the team making the decision of leaving. Believing the presenters were the main target of the controversy, Clarkson, Hammond and May left for Buenos Aires alongside the women of the crew, while the rest of the team focused on driving their equipment and the cars, both the presenters' and their own, back to the border with Chile; in a statement made by May after the incident, planning was done for possible airlifts for the crew if the journey to the border had become too dangerous, in which he and his fellow presenters assisted in planning prior to flying back to Britain. The film crew, driving back to the border in convoy, faced three major problems in their attempt to leave; all of these were shown as part of the Patagonia Special. The first came when they found the road they had taken to arrive in Rio Grande a day earlier, was now closed to them by crowds of people, forcing them to drive on tertiary roads. The second came when an intimidating crowd stopped them deliberately in Tolhuin, before pelting their cars with eggs, rocks and other missiles before they could escape, resulting in two of the film crew being injured and their cars receiving minor damage. In light of the attack and believing they were a magnet for trouble, the team abandoned the presenters' cars and continued on through the night for the border; pictures show that the abandoned cars had been attacked and damaged with stones. Their third problem came when, at 2am that night, they had to find a tractor to help get the camera cars across the river and into Chile.

Following the incident, the Argentine ambassador Alicia Castro met with BBC Director of Television Danny Cohen on 31 October 2014, and demanded a formal apology for what occurred. However, the BBC refused to do so, making it clear that they intended to broadcast the special as a fair representation of the events that occurred. On 28 May 2015, the BBC Trust, after investigating claims that there was a "cover-up" going on involving the use of the number plate, ruled that this was not the case and that no evidence had been provided to show that the reference to the Falklands War had been deliberate, adding it would not take further action on the matter. On 29 October, later that year, The Guardian reported that an appeal made at the appeal courts in Argentina had successfully demanded that Judge Maria Cristina Barrionuevo was to re-open a criminal investigation she had presided over, after she had decided not to press ahead with a full-scale investigation into the crew's decision to change the Porsche's number plate. Her decision to do so was because she had felt that it had been forced to happen by "massive government and popular pressure", despite the fact that it is an offence in the country to change a vehicle's registered licence plate to another.

=== Jeremy Clarkson's suspension and dismissal ===
In March 2015, the BBC announced that it had suspended Jeremy Clarkson while it would look into an incident that had occurred during filming in Hawes, North Yorkshire, with the remaining episodes of the series withdrawn while they dealt with their investigations. Former Stig, Perry McCarthy, criticised the decision by the broadcaster to pull the episodes from the schedule. Media coverage of the matter soon revealed that Clarkson had physically and verbally abused a producer, Oisin Tymon, after being offered soup and a cold meat platter instead of the steak he wanted, and learning that the chef at the hotel they were staying at had gone home. Despite a petition starting on Change.org on 10 March by blogger Guido Fawkes, aimed at reversing the decision on Clarkson being suspended, and being delivered on the afternoon of 20 March to the BBC after receiving one million signatures, which made it the fastest-growing campaign in Change.org's history, the broadcaster officially announced on 25 March that after deliberations on Clarkson's action and behaviour, it had decided to not renew his contract, effectively axing him from the show. Clarkson's departure would be soon followed by the departures of May, Hammond, and executive producer Andy Wilman, after which the four would then form a new show for Amazon named The Grand Tour.

On 24 February 2016, Clarkson formally apologised to Tymon, while settling a claim made by the producer for racial discrimination and physical injury sustained in the incident.

Due to Clarkson's dismissal, the series was shortened by two episodes. The planned eighth episode would have featured Gary Lineker as the Star in a Reasonably Priced Car, while Henry Cavill would have been the guest in episode nine. Episode nine would have also featured an additional film featuring Clarkson testing a trio of luxury limousines on and off the track. The planned tenth and final episode would have been a special in which the three presenters take an epic road trip across "one of the most remote areas of the planet".
