= Gibbs Aquada =

Fast amphibious vehicle

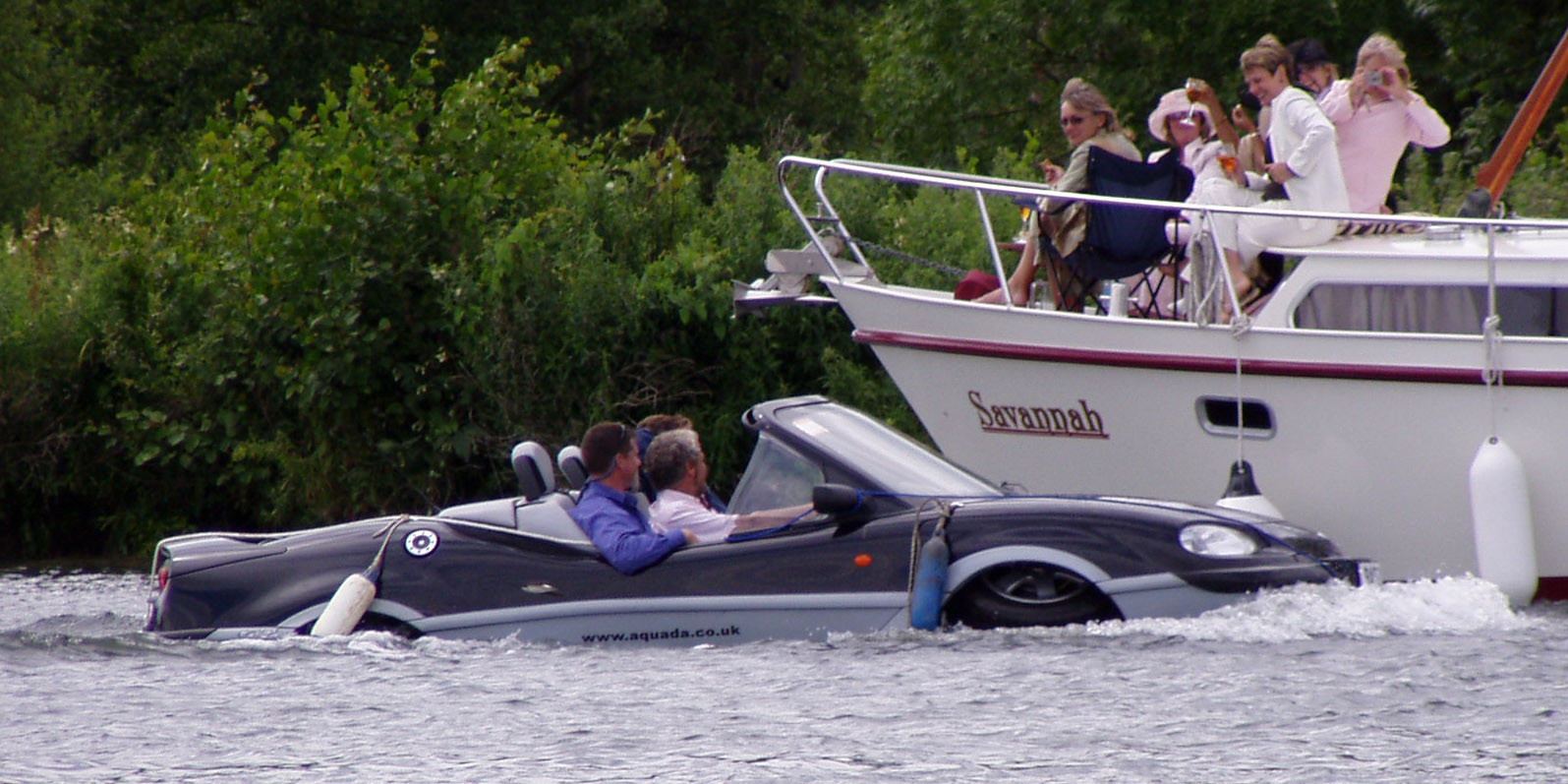

Overview
- Manufacturer: Gibbs Sports Amphibians
- Production: 2003–2004

Body and chassis
- Class: amphibious vehicle
- Body style: two-door convertible

Powertrain
- Engine: 2.5 L Rover V6 engine

The Gibbs Aquada is a high speed amphibious vehicle developed by Gibbs Sports Amphibians produced in 2003 and 2004, It is powered by a 2.5 L Rover V6 engine And is capable of reaching speeds over 160 kilometres per hour (99 mph) on land and 50 kilometres per hour (31 miles per hour; 27 knots) on water. Rather than adding wheels to a boat design, or creating a car that floats, the Aquada was designed from the ground up to perform very well in both fields, with over 60 patents covering technical innovations.

In 2004 Richard Branson, owner of the Virgin Group, used a Gibbs Aquada to set a new record for crossing the English Channel in an amphibious vehicle. Branson cut 4 hours 20 minutes off the previous record of 6 hours, which had stood since the late 1960s. The officially recorded time was 1 hour 40 minutes, 6 seconds.

For the August 2004 edition of Top Gear magazine, journalist Paul Walton drove an Aquada into and around the Monaco harbour during the Grand Prix of Monaco to watch the event for free. He found the Aquada fast and responsive both in and out of the water but was too slow to see any of the race.

The Aquada was developed in Auckland, New Zealand. The successors to the Aquada are the Gibbs Humdinga and the Gibbs Quadski.

== See also ==
- Amphicar (1961)
- Gibbs Humdinga (2006)
- Gibbs Quadski (2006)
- WaterCar
- Rinspeed sQuba
- List of car manufacturers of the United Kingdom
