= Hans Trippel =

German industrial designer

Hans Trippel (19 July 1908 – 30 July 2001) was a German industrial designer, responsible for the designs of the Trippel SG6, Mercedes-Benz Gullwing's door and the Amphicar.

Trippel was born on 19 July 1908 in the Darmstadt area and died 30 July 2001, in 64711 Erbach / Odenwald. In 1934, he embarked upon a career as a racing driver. In retrospect, he is better remembered for the development of amphibious motor vehicles. Also noteworthy is his membership of the quasi-military SA. As an active supporter of the Nazi regime in 1940 when France was invaded by Germany, Trippel took over control of the Bugatti plant at Molsheim. Following Germany's defeat in 1945, he was interned as a war profiteer by the French authorities for three years, until 1949.
