= Trippel SG6 =

Trippel SG 6
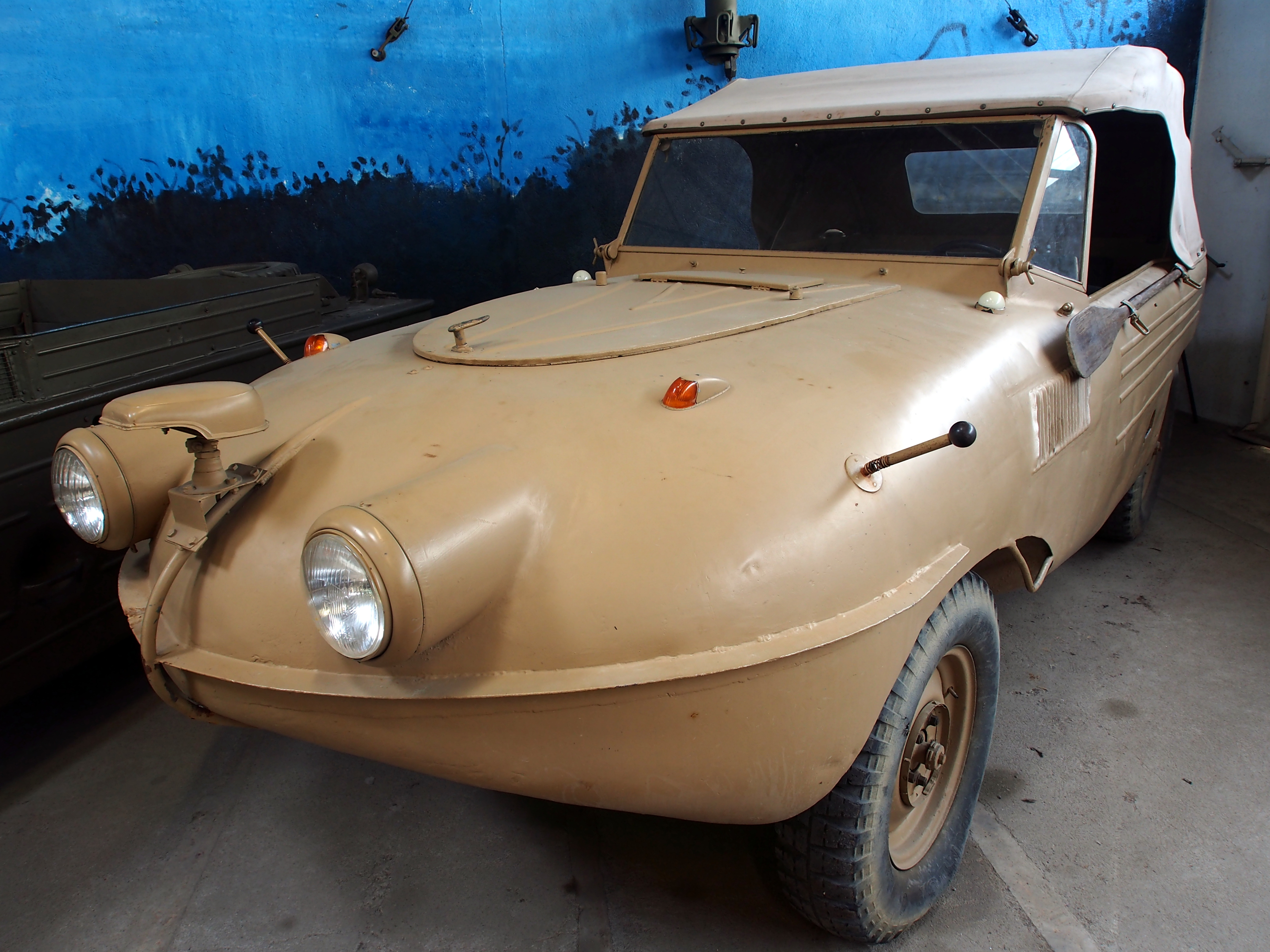
- Trippel SG 6/41 in a museum
- Type: Amphibious vehicle
- Place of origin: Germany

Service history
- Used by: Germany
- Wars: World War II

Specifications (Trippel SG6/41)
- Mass: 1,660 kg (3,660 lb) empty
- Length: 4.77 m (15 ft 8 in)
- Width: 1.80 m (5 ft 11 in)
- Height: 1.91 m (6 ft 3 in)
- Engine: Opel 2.5L I6; 55 hp
- Payload capacity: 500 kg
- Ground clearance: 26 cm (10 in)
- Maximum speed: 95 km/h (60 mph) land 14.5 km/h (9.0 mph) water

The Trippel SG 6 was a Schwimmwagen (amphibious vehicle) developed in the 1930s and used by the German ground forces during the Second World War.

== History ==
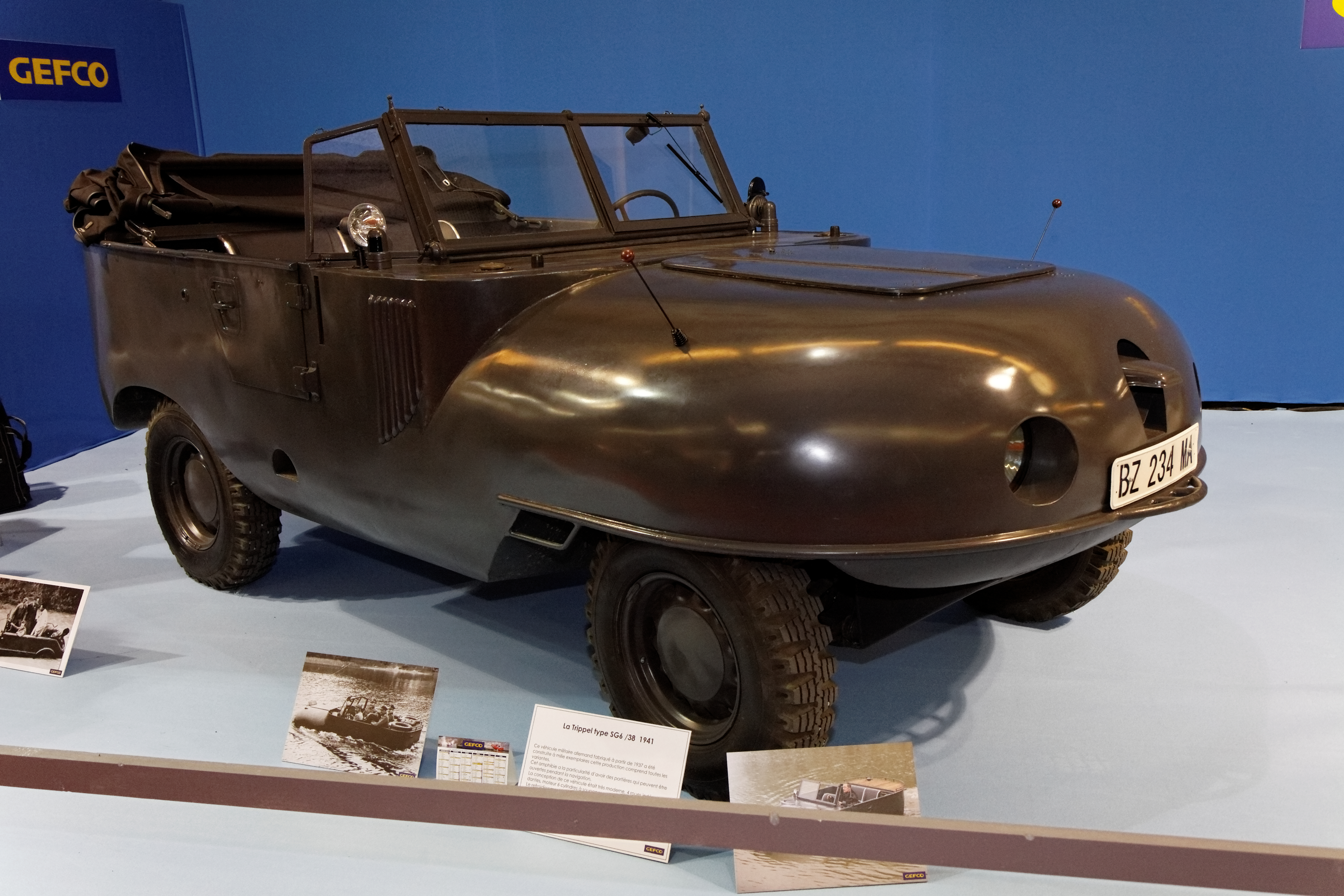
Trippel SG 6/38

In 1935 Hans Trippel began to design all-terrain amphibious vehicle prototypes. In 1936 a factory was established in Hamburg for the mass-production of such vehicles.

Instead of a commercial suspension provided with a buoyant vehicle body, Trippel designed a streamlined, tub-shaped body into which the vehicle technology was fitted. The resulting Schwimmwagen SG 6 was intended for civilian use such as expeditions, but from the outset it was clear that the production of the vehicle could only be economical if military customers would order the amphibious vehicles in larger numbers. The first order of 20 vehicles went to the Wehrmacht. This version of the SG 6 was manufactured from 1937 to 1940.

At the end of September, 1938, a Trippel SG 6 was used on an advertising drive from Hamburg to Naples and then across the 28 km (17 mi) water route to the island of Capri.

At the request of the military, a version of the SG 6 was built with an enlarged interior for transporting up to 16 soldiers. This military variant of Schwimmwagen was manufactured from 1939 to 1943.

In 1940, Trippel revised the streamlining and enhanced the detailing of the civilian version of the SG 6, resulting in the SG 6 Colonial Pioneer, but only a few were made because of the war.

Following the development of the swimming characteristics of the Colonial Pioneer model, the military version of the Schwimmwagen was also revised. The two doors were removed and the damage control improved. Production of this vehicle began in 1941 under the designation SG 6/41 at the Bugatti works in Molsheim in Alsace. With the outbreak of war in September 1939, Bugatti ceased the manufacture of expensive luxury vehicles and after the fall of France in June 1940, Bugatti, on August 12, 1940 signed a lease agreement with the Trippel-works, to move the latter's headquarters to Molsheim.

From 1942, a version of the SG 6 with a folding roof was manufactured. From 1943, the production of SG 6 was shut down, and in 1944 replaced by the Volkswagen Schwimmwagen Type 166 which was much lighter and also cheaper to manufacture. A total of about 800 SG-6-Schwimmwagen were produced.
