= WaterCar =

American amphibious vehicle maker

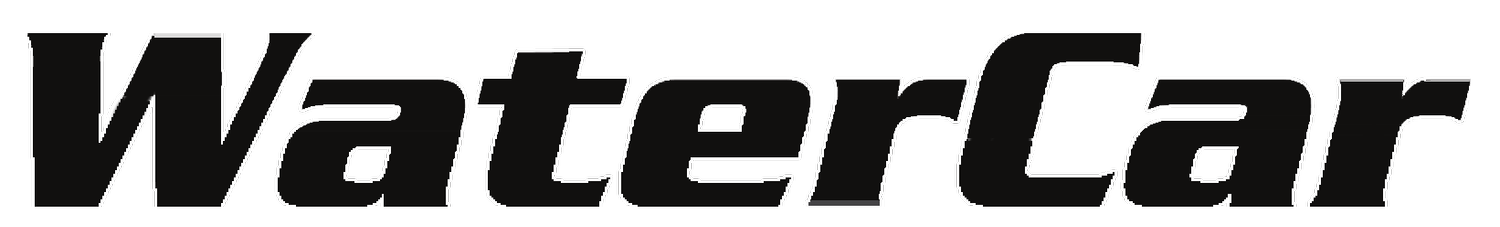
- Type: Private
- Industry: Automotive, Amphibious vehicles
- Founded: 1999; 27 years ago in Southern California, U.S.
- Founder: Dave March
- Headquarters: Fountain Valley, California, U.S.
- Key people: Dave March (Founder)
- Products: WaterCar Panther, WaterCar EV
- Brands: Sushiya (via Tokyo Gardens Catering)
- Owner: Dave March
- Subsidiaries: Fountain Valley BodyWorks
- Website: watercar.com

WaterCar is an American company that specializes in the manufacture and development of luxury amphibious vehicles. Based in Southern California, the company was founded by Dave March in 1999 when he was inspired by the Amphicar of the 1960s. March claims he originally had no plans to market an amphibious vehicle – just merely to build one. In 2013, the company released its first commercial vehicle, the Panther, which holds a top speed of 80 mph (130 km/h) on land and 45 mph (72 km/h) on water. The company holds 27 amphibious related patents as well as the Guinness World Record for the fastest amphibious vehicle. WaterCar vehicles are designed and manufactured at Fountain Valley BodyWorks, an 85,000 square feet (7,900 m^{2}) collision repair auto body shop in Southern California, owned and operated by March.

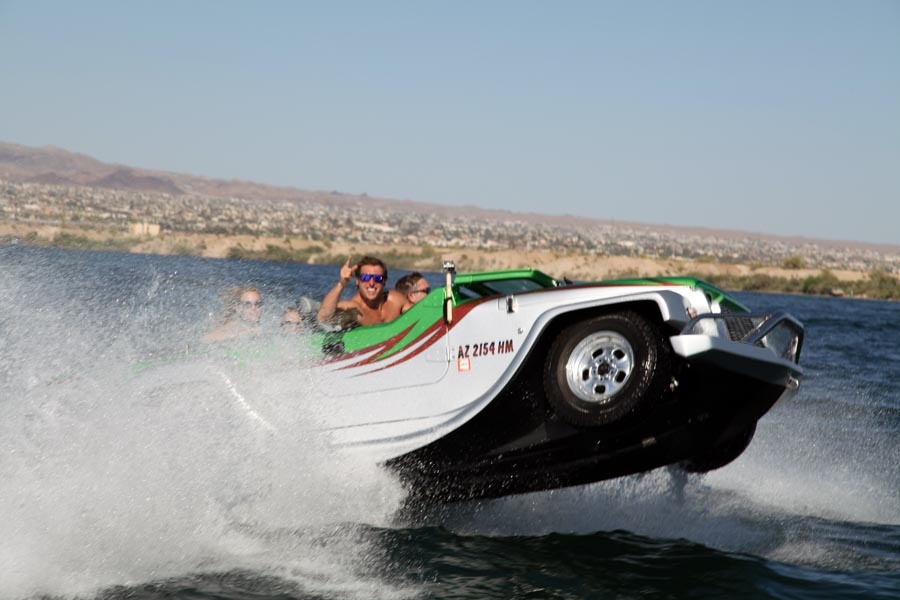
Water Car Panther driving at High Speeds on Lake Havasu

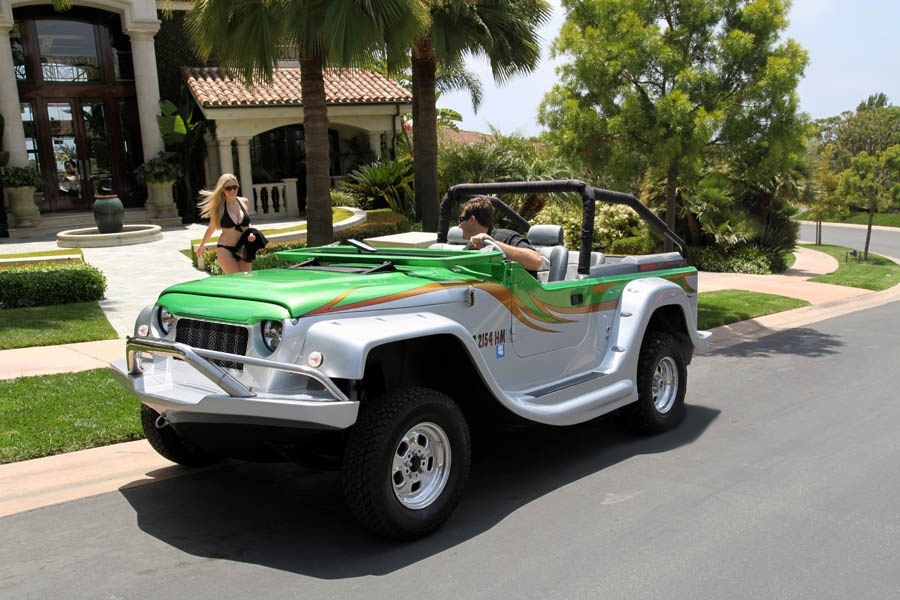
WaterCar Panther on Street in Newport, California

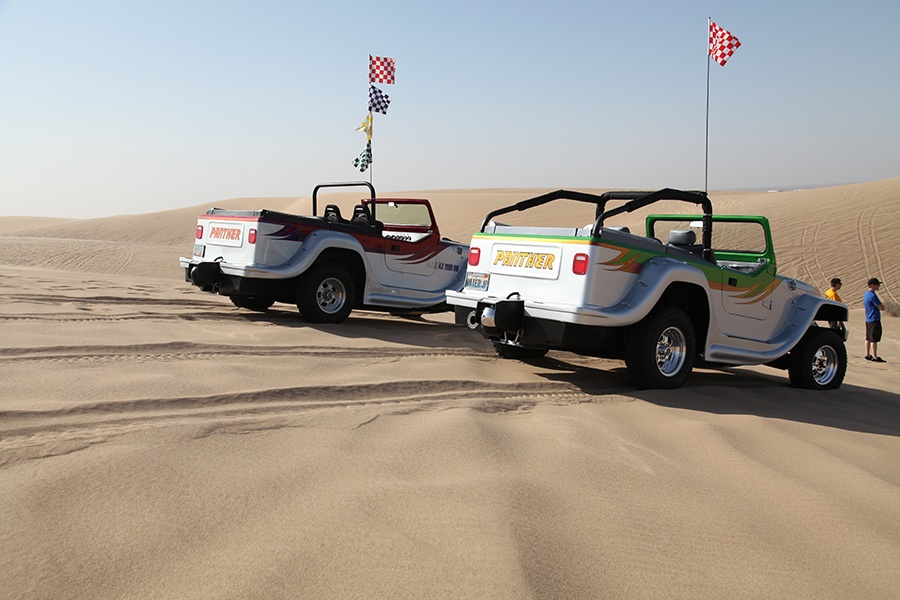
WaterCar Panther at Imperial Sand Dunes Recreational Area in Glamis, California

== History ==
Between 1999 and 2010, WaterCar developed three amphibious prototypes. One of these prototypes was the Python. Powered by a 450 hp (340 kW) Chevrolet Corvette engine, it reached land speeds of 127 mph (204 km/h), and water speeds of 60 mph (52 kn), setting a Guinness World Record in 2010. Due to the high cost of vehicle production, the Python was never developed past the prototype phase.

In 2011, March began developing a more reliable amphibious vehicle using technology from the Python and other prototypes. In June 2013, he released the Panther, the first commercial vehicle developed by WaterCar. Since its release, WaterCar has been popular in the Middle East, selling to the Embassy of the United Arab Emirates, with six additional vehicles being sold to the Crown Prince of Dubai and others sold to tech enthusiasts and residents of Silicon Valley. The Panther's price is US$140,000 (initially US$135,000).

In January 2014, founder March was the first person to drive an amphibious vehicle from Newport Harbor to Catalina Island, a trip of over 30 mi (48 km). The trip took 70 minutes, and he completed the drive on an estimated 13 US gal (49 L; 11 imp gal) of gasoline, a little more than half the total capacity of the Water Car's 25 gallon tank.

March was not the first to drive an amphibious car to an island; the first was Howard Singer of La Jolla who on Aug. 19, 1978, became the first person to drive an amphibious car from Long Beach to Santa Catalina Island. He left from the Long Beach Navy Pier at 7:30 a.m. driving an "Amphicar" and arrived at Avalon at about 3:15 p.m.

== WaterCar EV ==
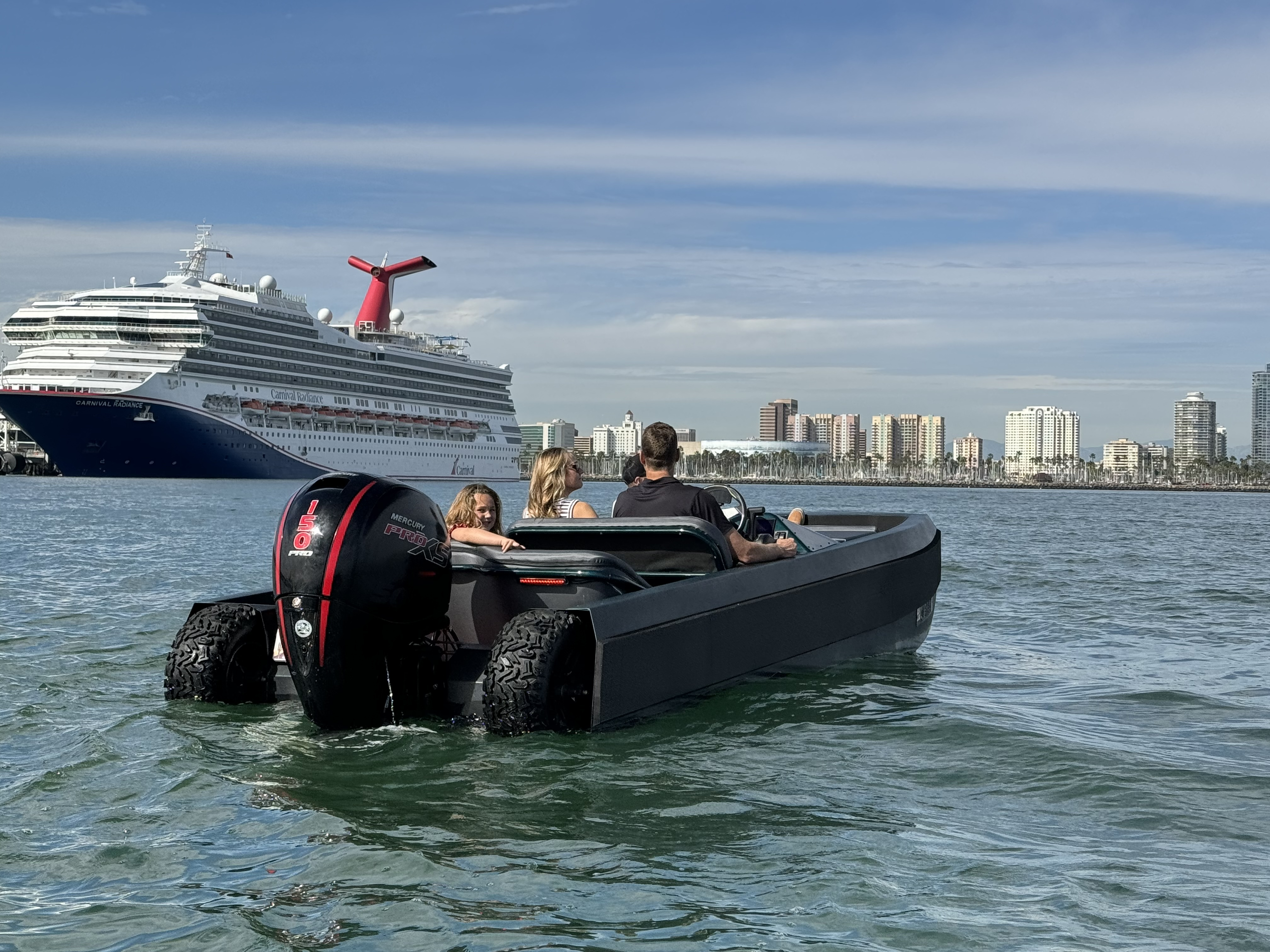
The WaterCar EV boating in Long Beach, California.

In 2024, WaterCar introduced the WaterCar EV, a hybrid vehicle designed to eliminate the need for boat trailers, docking fees, and the hassle of boat ramps. The vehicle is powered by a 115-horsepower Mercury 115 Pro XS engine for water propulsion and a 48-volt electric motor for land travel. On water, it reaches speeds of 35 mph (56 km/h), and on land, it has a top speed of 25 mph (40 km/h) with a range of 100 miles (161 km) per charge

Each WaterCar EV is hand-built and takes over 1,000 man-hours to complete. It is registered on land as a LSV (Low Speed Electric Vehicle) and a boat on the water.

== Technology ==
The WaterCar Panther is powered with a rear-mounted Honda Acura 3.7-liter engine, and a "Panther"-Jet boat drive engine. The vehicle can transition from land to sea and vice versa in under fifteen seconds, and has a hydraulic off-road suspension that retracts the wheels in less than eight seconds. This allows the Panther to drive into the water at 15 mph. Once in the water, the driver puts the vehicle in neutral, pulls a handle that switches the transfer case over to jet drive, pushes a lever to hydraulically lift the wheels and tires out of the water, and begins operating the vehicle just like a boat. The process is reversed when going from water to land.

Each vehicle employs a lightweight chassis made of chromoly steel (an alloy of chromium and molybdenum) that fits into a fiberglass hull. This development model allows for the light weight needed for an amphibious vehicle. The interior is made of road suspension seats as well as US Coast Guard approved closed-cell Styrofoam.

== In the media ==
In 2014, the WaterCar Panther was featured in ABC's reality television series The Bachelor (S18, E06). The WaterCar has also been featured in USA Network's television series Royal Pains (S05, E15 • A Trismus Story), on the CNBC episode Just Add Water (S02, E11 • Nov. 30, 2016) of Jay Leno's Garage, and in the movie Vanguard.
