= Amphibious vehicle =

Vehicle that works on land and on/under water

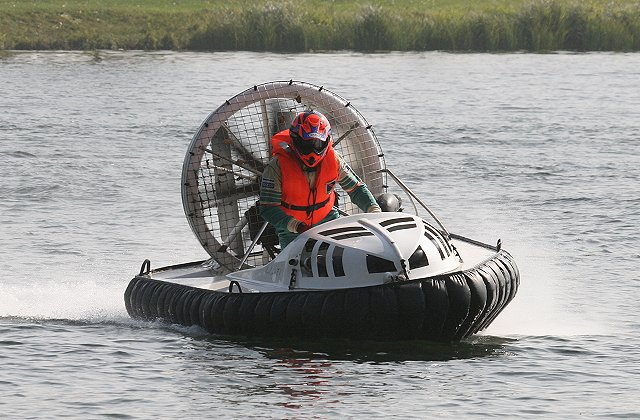
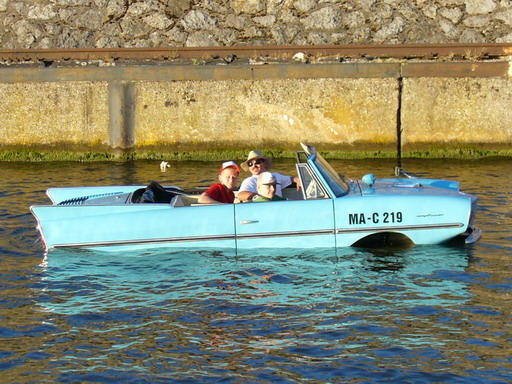
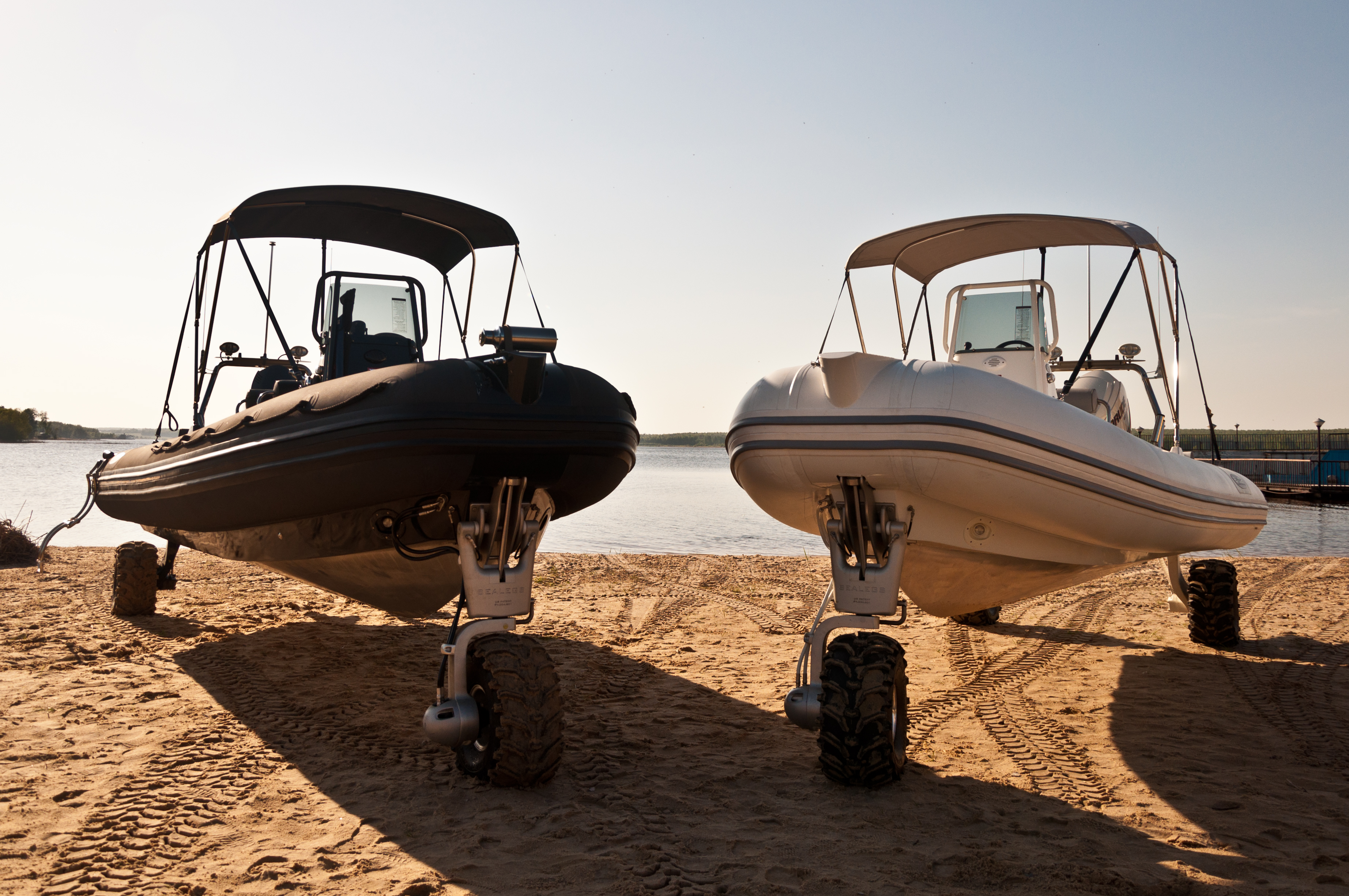
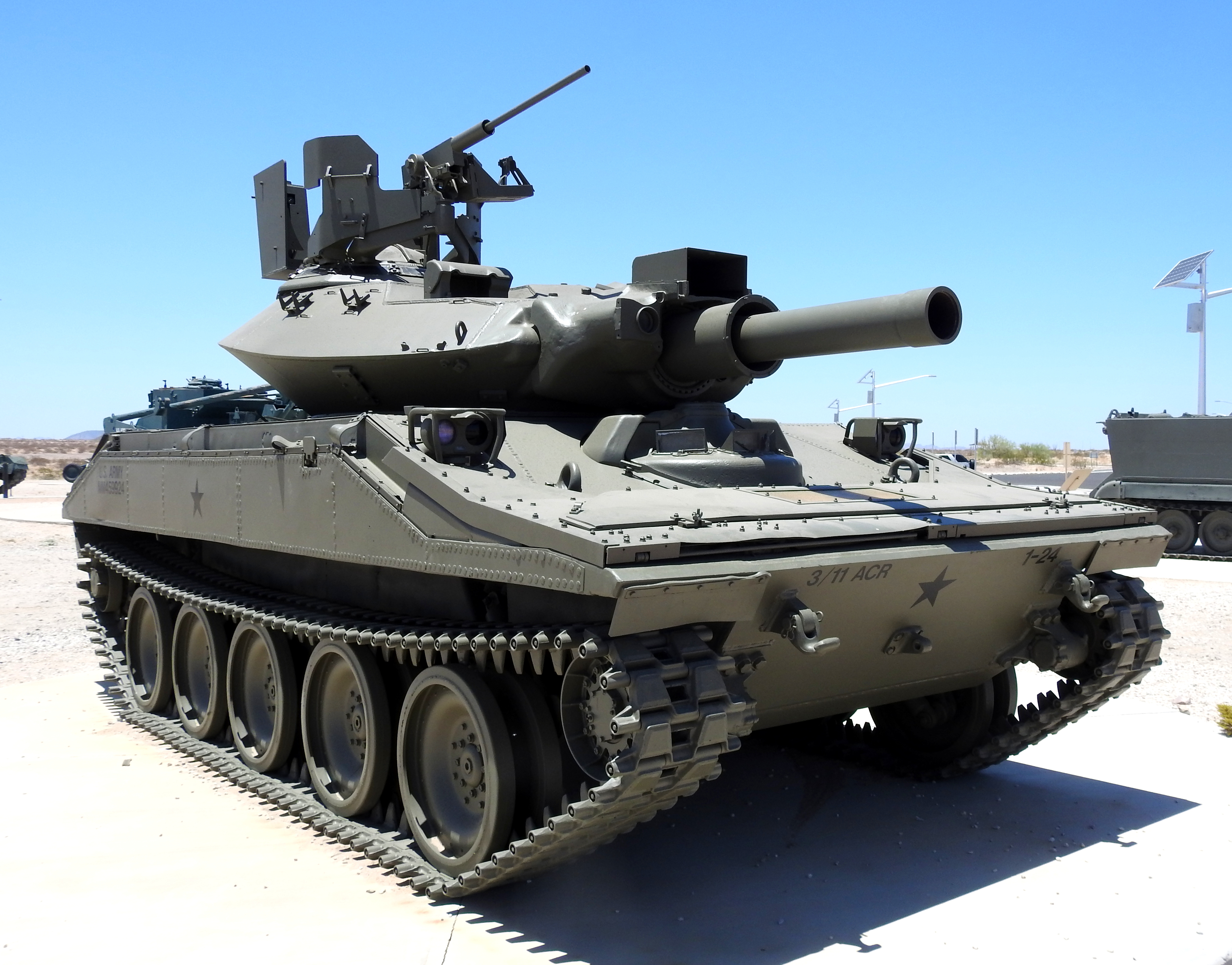
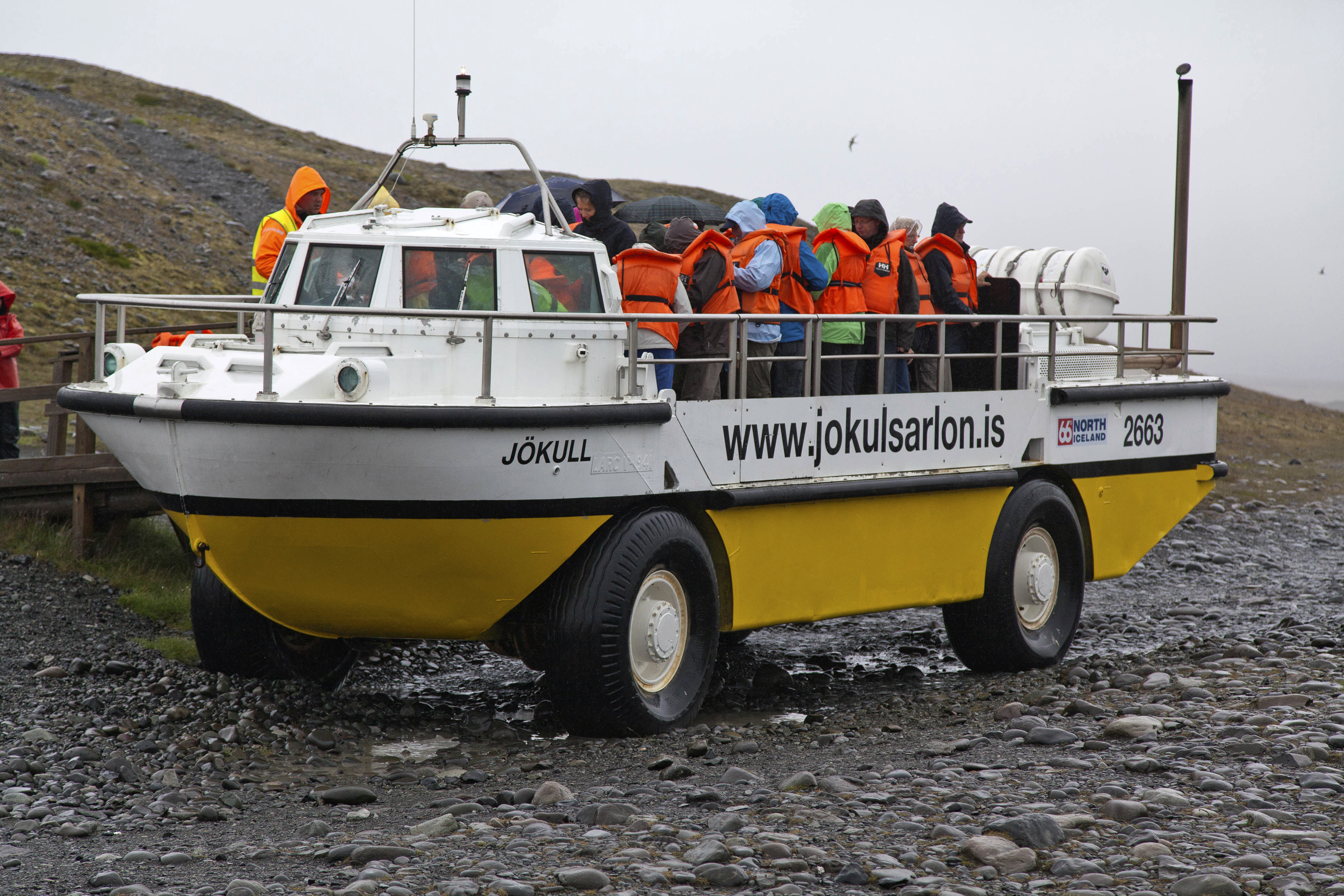
Some examples of amphibious vehicles: a hovercraft, an amphibious automobile, an amphibious boat, an amphibious tank, a specialized cargo vehicle

An amphibious vehicle (or simply amphibian) is a vehicle that works both on land and on or under water. Amphibious vehicles include amphibious bicycles, ATVs, cars, buses, trucks, railway vehicles, combat vehicles, and hovercraft.

Classic landing craft are not amphibious vehicles as they do not work on land, although they are part of amphibious warfare. Ground effect vehicles, such as ekranoplans, would likely crash on any but the flattest of landmasses so are also not considered to be amphibious vehicles.

== General technical notes ==
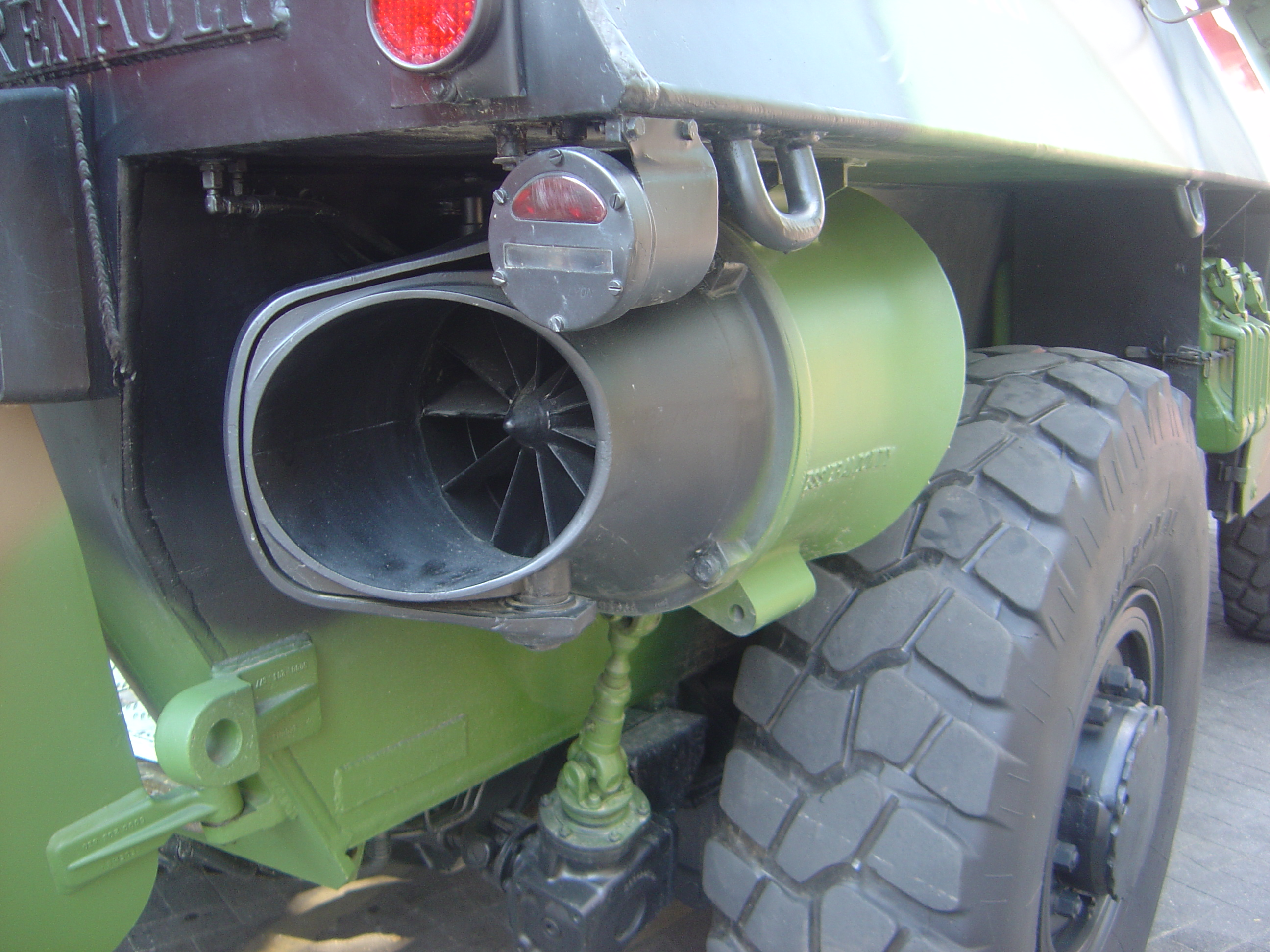
Pod Water Jet on a French VAB

Two main categories of amphibious vehicles are those that travel on an air cushion (Hovercraft) and those that do not. Among the latter, many extend the off-road capabilities of land vehicles to all kinds of terrain, including ice, snow, mud, marsh, swamp etc. This explains why many designs use tracks in addition to or instead of wheels, and in some cases have articulated body configurations or other unconventional designs such as screw-propelled vehicles which use auger-like barrels which propel a vehicle through muddy terrain with a twisting motion.

Most land vehicles – even lightly armoured ones – can be made amphibious simply by providing them with a waterproof hull and perhaps a propeller. This is possible as a typical vehicle's average density is less than that of water (mostly due to a large amount of empty space), and thus will float. Heavily armoured vehicles, however, sometimes have a density greater than water (their weight in kilograms exceeds their volume in litres) and will need additional buoyancy, in the form of inflatable floatation devices, much like the sides of a rubber dinghy, or a waterproof fabric skirt raised from the top perimeter of the vehicle, to increase its displacement.

For propulsion in or on the water some vehicles simply spin their wheels or tracks, while others use screw propeller(s) or water jet(s). Most amphibians will work only as a displacement hull when in the water – few can hydroplane, skimming over the water like speedboats.

== Early history ==
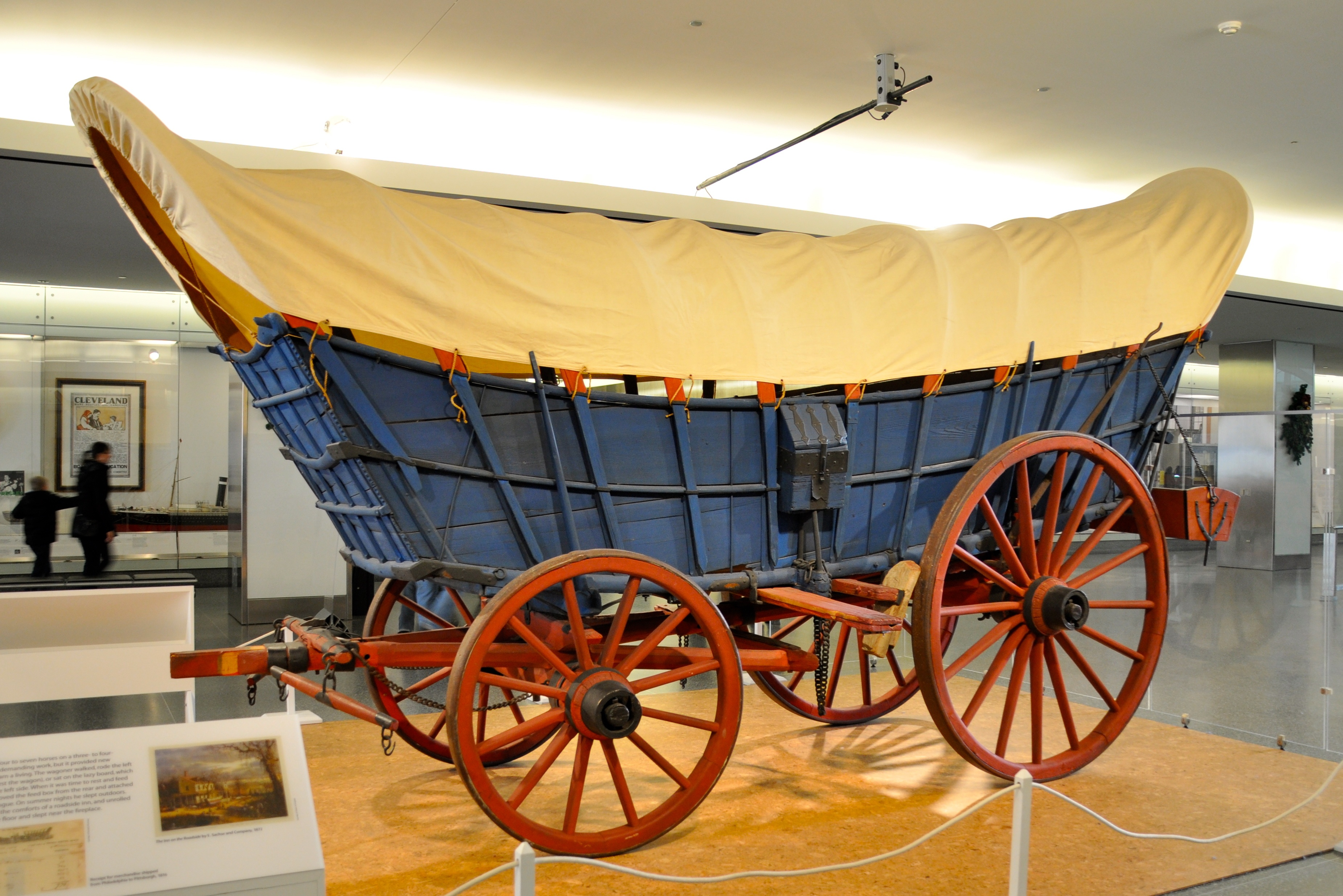
A conestoga wagon

Some of the earliest known amphibious vehicles were amphibious carriages, the invention of which is credited to the Neapolitan polymath Prince Raimondo di Sangro of Sansevero in July 1770 or earlier, or Samuel Bentham whose design of 1781 was built in June 1987.

The conestoga wagon, a type of a heavy covered wagon, was popular during the 18th and 19th century in the United States and Canada. The wagon was designed in such a way as to be able to cross rivers and streams.

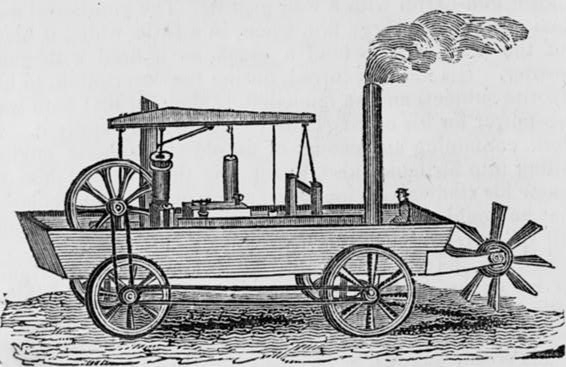
Amphibious steam-powered carriage designed by Oliver Evans (1775–1819)

The first known self-propelled amphibious vehicle, a steam-powered wheeled dredging barge, named the Orukter Amphibolos, was conceived and built by United States inventor Oliver Evans in 1805, although it is disputed to have successfully travelled over land or water under its own steam.

Inventor Gail Borden, better known for condensed milk, designed and tested a sail-powered wagon in 1849. On testing, it reportedly tipped over 50 feet (15 m) from shore, from an apparent lack of ballast to counteract the force of the wind in the sail.

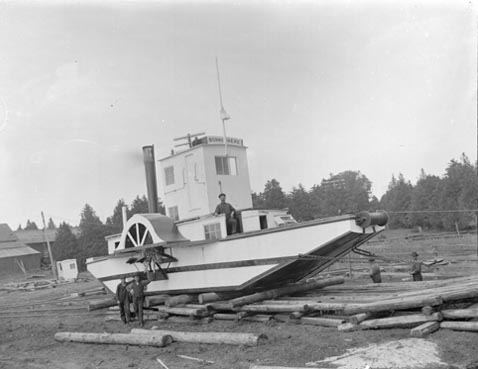
Alligator tug Bonnechere, 1907

In the 1870s, logging companies in eastern Canada and the northern United States developed a steam-powered amphibious tug called an "Alligator" which could cross between lakes and rivers. The most successful Alligator tugs were produced by the firm of West and Peachey in Simcoe, Ontario.

Until the late 1920s, the efforts to unify a boat and an automobile mostly came down to simply putting wheels and axles on a boat hull, or getting a rolling chassis to float by blending a boat-like hull with the car's frame. One of the first reasonably well-documented cases was the 1905 amphibious petrol-powered carriage of T. Richmond (Jessup, Iowa, USA). Just like the world's first petrol-powered automobile (1885, Carl Benz), it was a three-wheeler. The single front wheel provided direction, both on land and in the water. A three-cylinder petrol combustion-engine powered the oversized rear wheels. In order to get the wheels to provide propulsion in the water, fins or buckets would be attached to the rear wheel spokes. Remarkably the boat-like hull was one of the first integral bodies ever used on a car.

Since the 1920s, many diverse amphibious vehicles designs have been created for a broad range of applications, including recreation, expeditions, search & rescue, and military, leading to a myriad of concepts and variants. In some of them, the amphibious capabilities are central to their purpose, whereas in others they are only an expansion to what has remained primarily a watercraft or a land vehicle. The design that came together with all the features needed for a practical all-terrain amphibious vehicle was by Peter Prell of New Jersey. His design, unlike others, could operate not only on rivers and lakes but the sea and did not require firm ground to enter or exit the water. It combined a boat-like hull with tank-like tracks. In 1931, he tested a scaled down version of his invention.

== Wheeled ==
=== Unarmored ===
==== Cycles ====
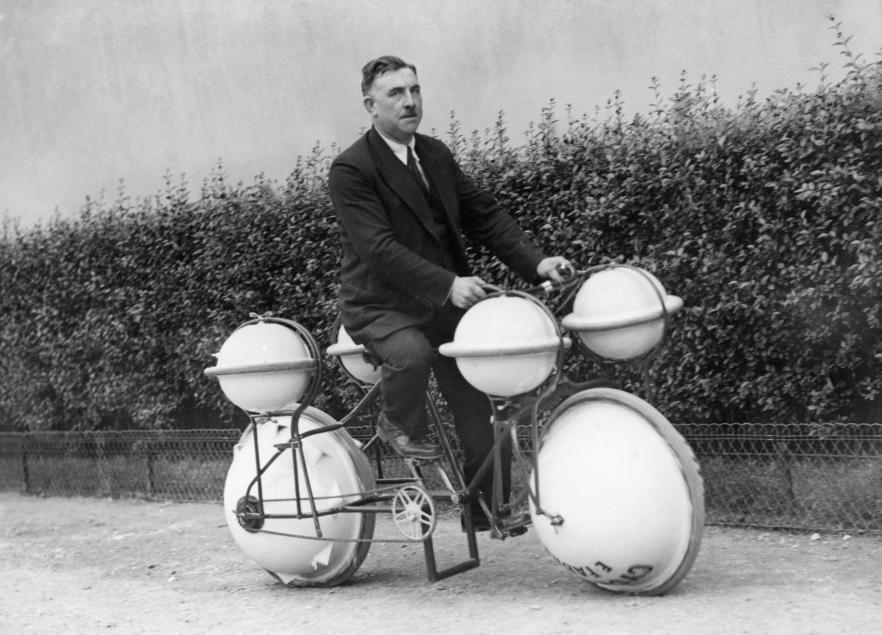
Amphibious bike 'Cyclomer', Paris, 1932

An amphibious cycle is a human-powered vehicle capable of operation on both land and water. "Saidullah's Bicycle" uses four rectangular air filled floats for buoyancy, and is propelled using two fan blades which are attached to the spokes. Moraga's "Cyclo Amphibious" uses a simple tricycle frame to support three floaters which provide both the floatation and thrust. The wings on the powered wheels propel the vehicle in a similar way to a paddle wheel.

The SBK Engineering Shuttle-Bike consists of two inflatable floats with straps that allow the carrying of a bicycle with a passenger. The ensemble, when deflated, fits in a backpack for carrying by the cyclist.

Several amphibious cycles have been created by engineering students as university projects.

Gibbs Sports Amphibians Inc. introduced a motorized version of the amphibious cycle that resembles a jet ski on water and motorcycle on land. The model can reach up to 80 mph by land and 45 mph by water.

==== ATVs ====
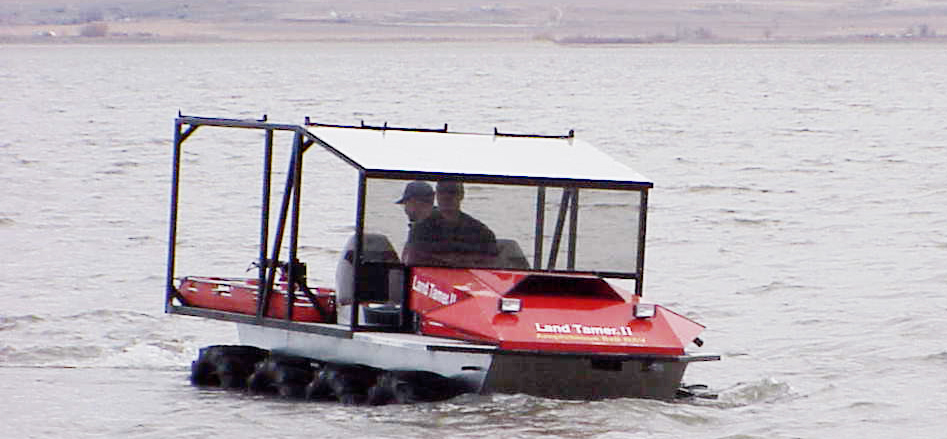
Land Tamer amphibious 8×8 remote access vehicle

Amongst the smallest non-air-cushioned amphibious vehicles are amphibious ATVs (all-terrain vehicles). These saw significant popularity in North America during the 1960s and early 1970s. Typically an amphibious ATV (AATV) is a small, lightweight, off-highway vehicle, constructed from an integral hard plastic or fibreglass bodytub, fitted with six (sometimes eight) driven wheels, with low pressure, balloon tires. With no suspension (other than what the tires offer) and no steering wheels, directional control is accomplished through skid-steering – just as on a tracked vehicle – either by braking the wheels on the side in the direction of the desired turn or by applying more throttle to the wheels on the opposite side. Most contemporary designs use garden tractor type engines, that will provide roughly 25 mph (40 km/h) top speed on land.

Constructed this way, an AATV will float with ample freeboard and is capable of traversing swamps, ponds, and streams as well as dry land. On land these units have high grip and great off-road ability, that can be further enhanced with an optional set of tracks that can be mounted directly onto the wheels. Although the spinning action of the tires is enough to propel the vehicle through the water – albeit slowly – outboard motors can be added for extended water use.

In October 2013, Gibbs Amphibians introduced the long-awaited Quadski, the first amphibious vehicle capable of traveling 45 mph on land or water. The Quadski was developed using Gibbs' High-Speed Amphibian technology, which Gibbs originally developed for the Aquada, an amphibious car, which the company has still not produced because of regulatory issues.

==== Cars ====
Amphibious automobiles have been conceived from ca. 1900; however, the Second World War significantly stimulated their development. Two of the most significant amphibious cars to date were developed during World War II. The most proliferous was the German Schwimmwagen, a small jeep-like 4×4 vehicle designed by the Porsche engineering firm in 1942 and widely used in World War II. The amphibious bodywork was designed by Erwin Komenda, the firm's body construction designer, using the engine and drive train of the Kübelwagen. An amphibious version of the Willys MB jeep, the Ford GPA or 'Seep' (short for Sea jeep) was developed during World War II as well. A specially modified GPA, called Half-Safe, was driven and sailed around the world by Australian Ben Carlin in the 1950s.

One of the most capable post-war amphibious off-roaders was the German Amphi-Ranger, that featured a hull made of seawater-resistant AlMg2 aluminium alloy. Extensively engineered, this costly vehicle was proven seaworthy at a Gale force 10 storm off the North Sea coast (Pohl, 1998). Only about 100 were built – those who own one have found it capable of crossing the English Channel almost effortlessly.

Purely recreational amphibian cars include the 1960s Amphicar and the contemporary Gibbs Aquada. With almost 4,000 pieces built, the Amphicar is still the most successfully produced civilian amphibious car to date. The Gibbs Aquada stands out due to its capability of high-speed planing on water. Gibbs built fifty Aquadas in the early 2000s after it was developed by a team assembled by founder Alan Gibbs before the company's engine supplier, Rover, was unable to continue providing engines. Gibbs and new partner Neil Jenkins reconstituted the company and are now seeking U.S. regulatory approval for the Aquada.

In 2010, a Southern California-based company named WaterCar set the Guinness World Record for Fastest Amphibious Vehicle, with their prototype, The Python, which reached top land speeds of 204 km/h (127 mph) and water speeds of 96 km/h (60 mph; 52 knots). Since then, the company launched their first commercial vehicle, The Panther, which has been featured on ABC's The Bachelor as well as USA's Royal Pains. The WaterCar can do 80 mph (129 km/h) on land, and 44 mph (38 knots; 71 km/h) on sea, and can transition from land to sea in less than 15 seconds. Since its release, WaterCar has been popular in the Middle East, selling to the Embassy of the United Arab Emirates, with six additional vehicles being sold to the Crown Prince of Dubai. The WaterCar has also been sold to tech enthusiasts and residents of Silicon Valley.

Other amphibious cars include the US Hydra Spyder.

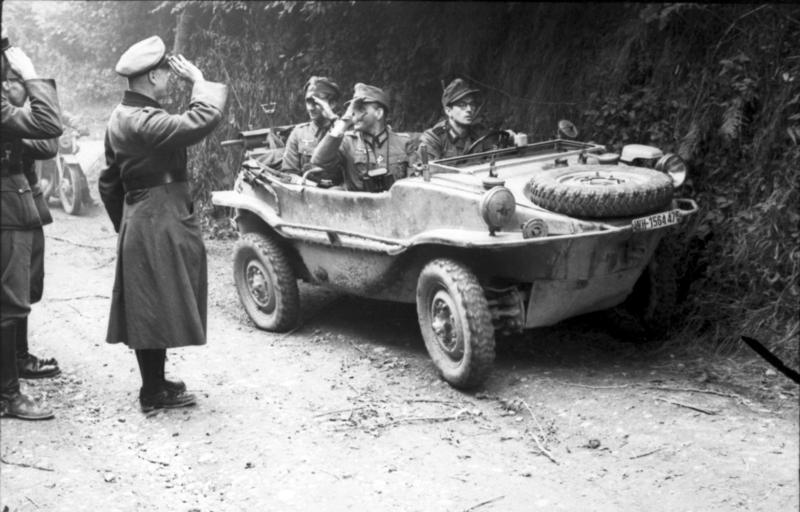
VW Schwimmwagen in June 1944

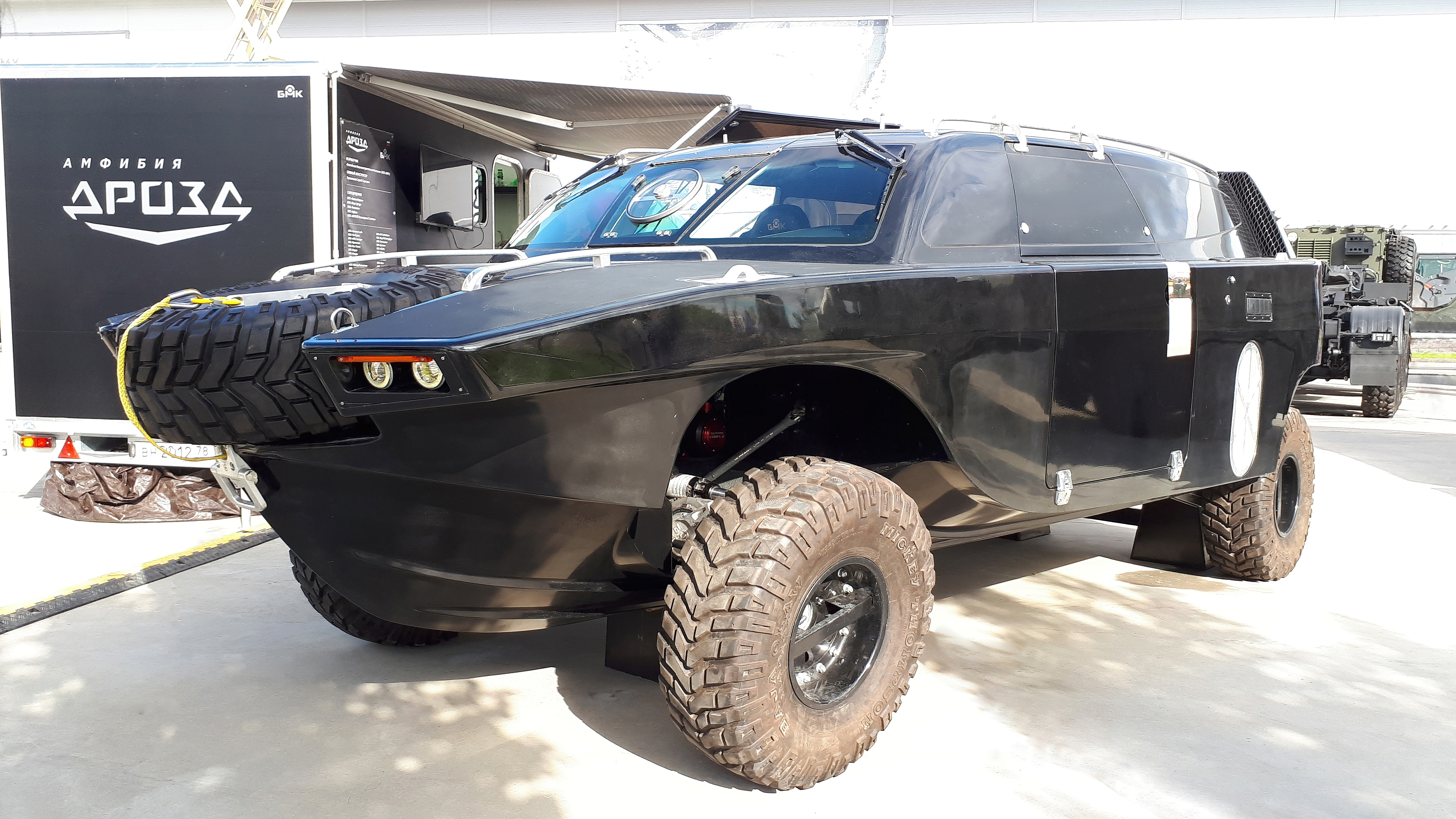
"Drozd" amphibious vehicle during the "Armiya 2020"

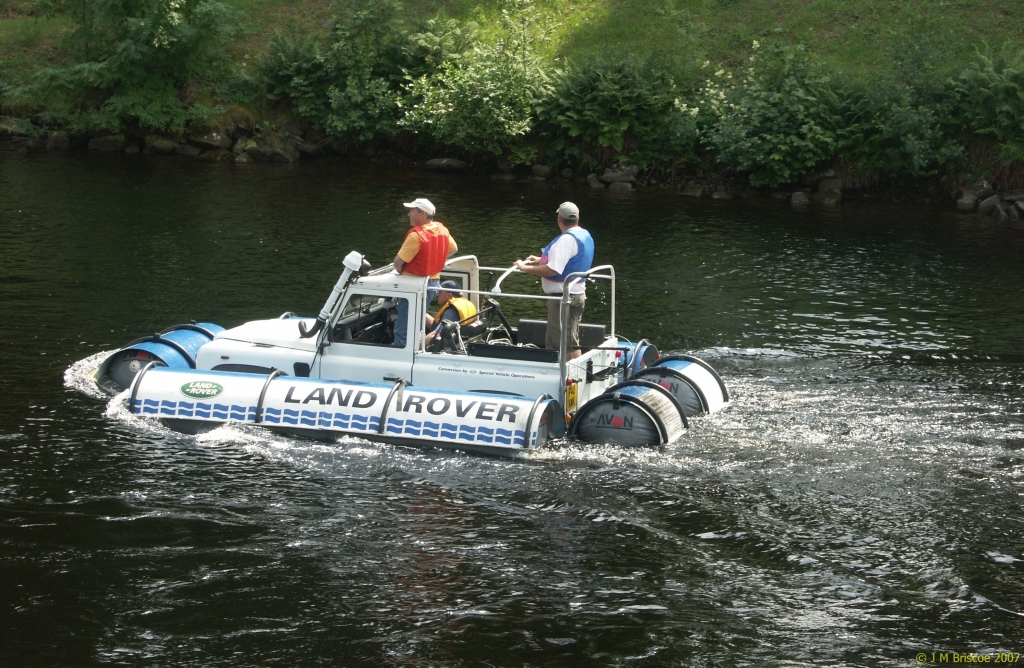
A Land Rover with inflatable floats to create a vehicle that will swim much like an improvised raft

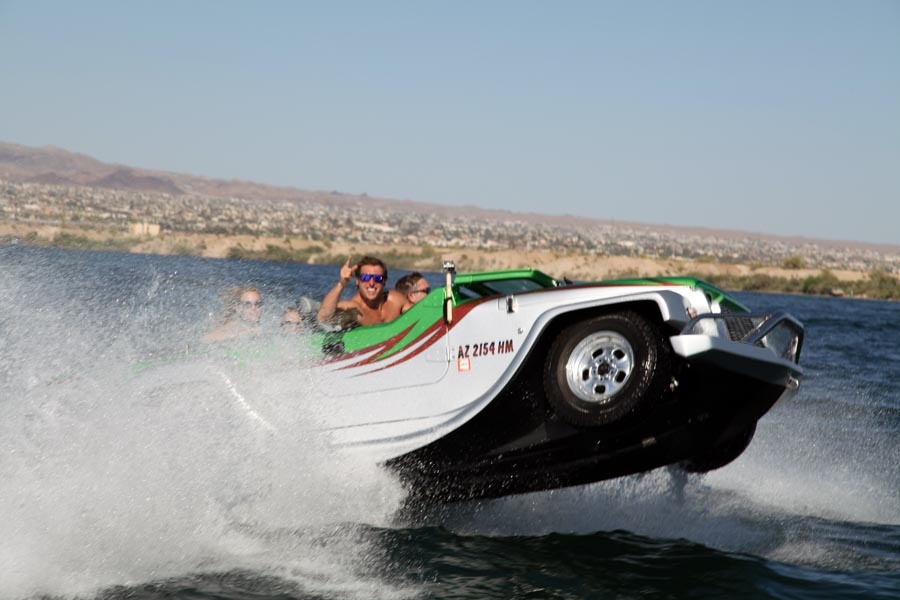
Water Car Panther driving at High Speeds on Lake Havasu, AZ.

==== Buses ====
Amfibus amphibious buses made by Dutch Amphibious Transport (DAT) in Nijmegen, Netherlands are used to operate tours of Amsterdam, Rotterdam and Lübeck, under the Splashtours brand. The buses have a Volvo chassis and carry 43 passengers. The operation started in 2010 in Katendrecht, Rotterdam, was copied in Amsterdam in 2011 but suspended in 2012 after technical problems, and then relaunched in 2019. A tour of Lübeck was launched in 2014. In 2010 it was tested as a replacement for the ferry at Renfrew, Scotland, but not adopted. A similar service, using different vehicles, operates in Porto.

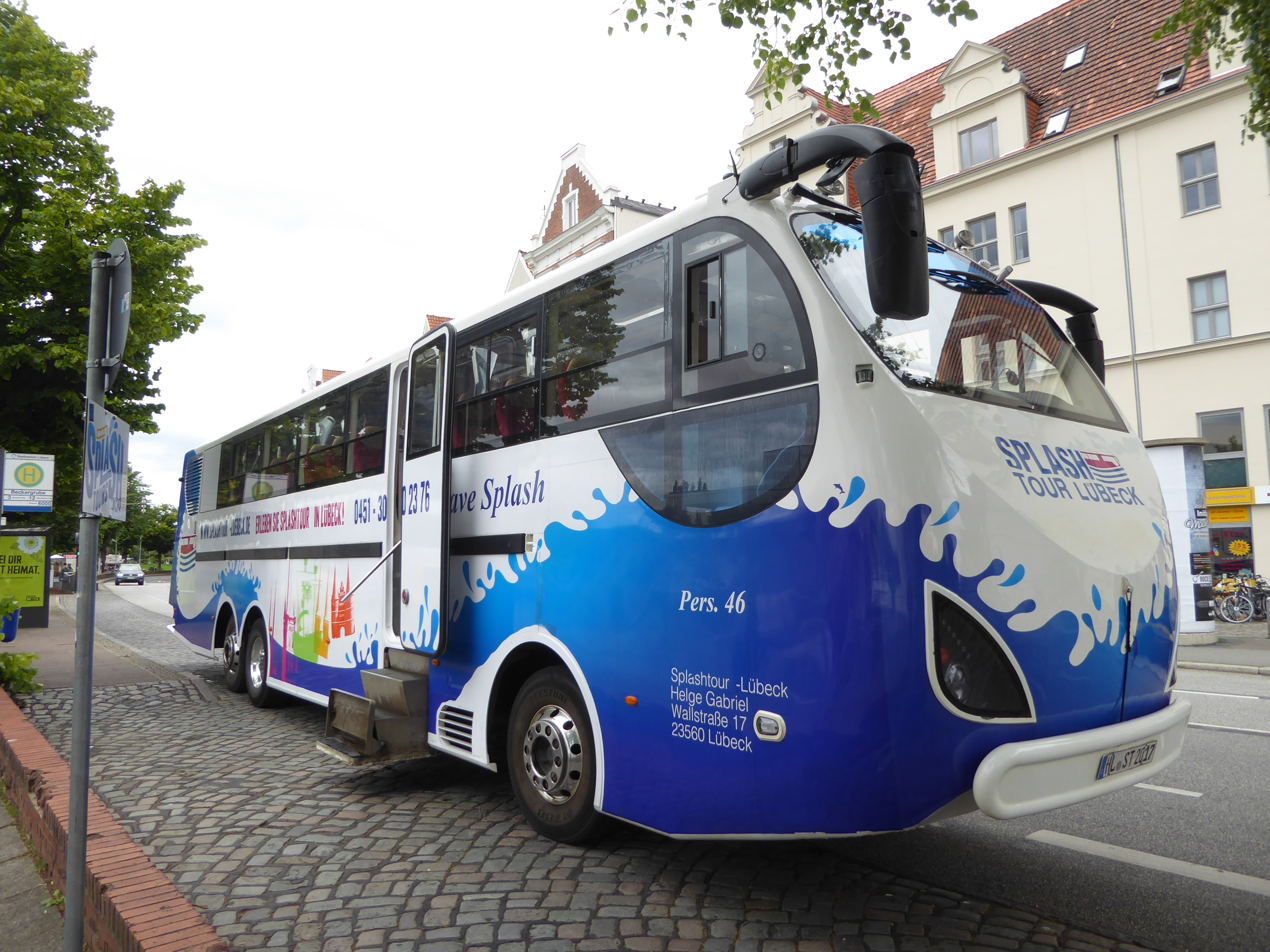
Splashtour 'Amfibus' amphibious bus, An der Untertrave, Lübeck, 12 August 2020

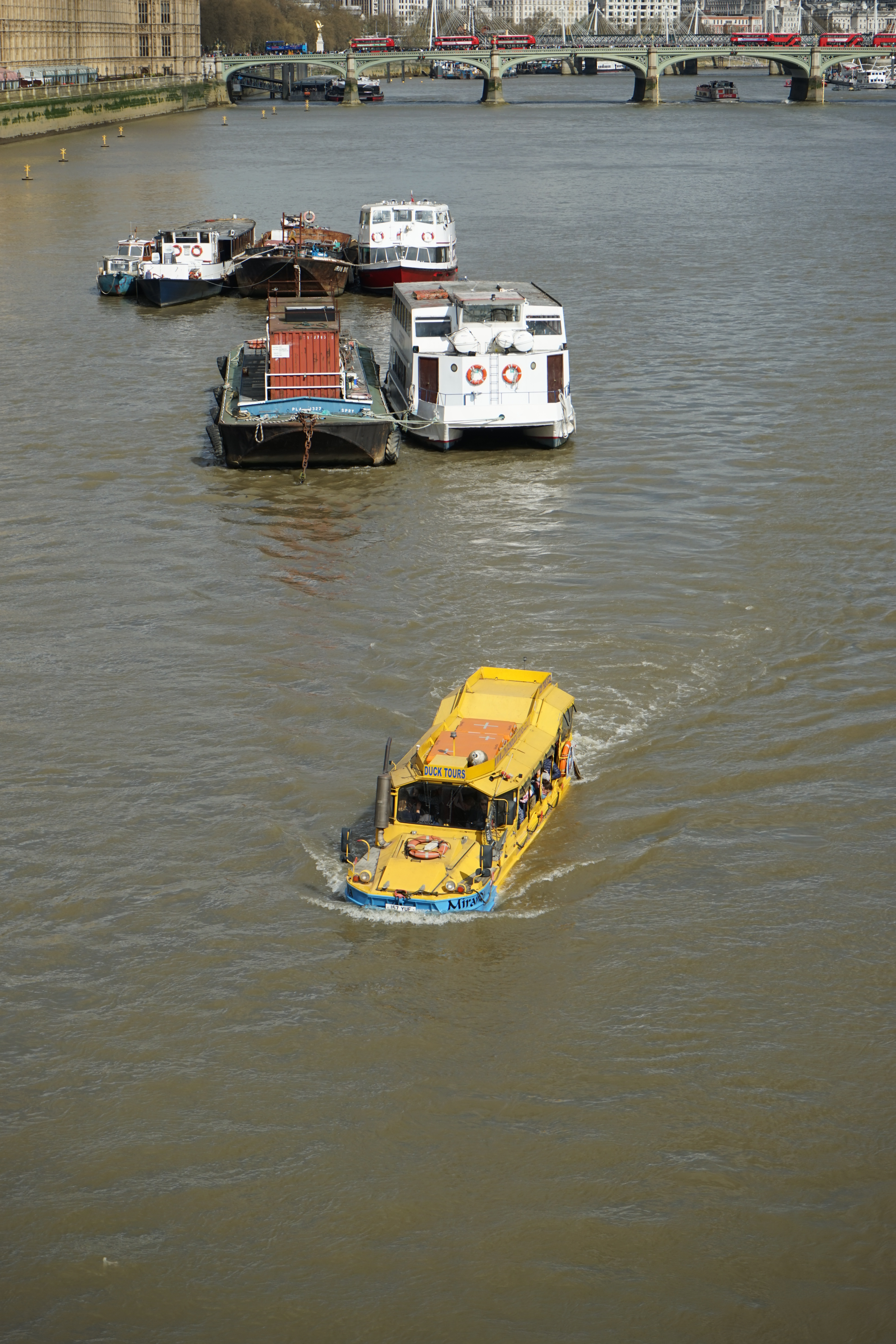
Amphibious tour bus – a converted DUKW – on Thames river in London near Lambeth Bridge.

==== Boats ====
Some amphibious vehicles, rather than being designed for land transport with the ability to cross water, are designed as water-transport vehicles with the ability to travel on land. The distinction is that the vehicles are designed to be high performing on water, with the land transport ability added to give additional functionality, rather than being the main function. Sealegs Amphibious Craft are an example of this, which are a range of aluminium three-wheeled fabricated boats (mostly RIBs) designed and manufactured in Auckland, New Zealand since 2005. These craft can travel up to 39 knots on water, but travel at only 7.5 km/h on land, showing the preference for water performance in design. Various versions of this type of amphibious boat design have been produced, including the French Iguana Yacht, an amphibious motorboat featuring all-terrain tracks (covered in the "Tracked" section below).

Recently, Gibbs Amphibians has developed a new type of amphibian, one capable of high speeds on both land and water. The vehicles use a patented hydraulic system to raise the wheels into the wheel wells, allowing the vehicles to plane on water. These vehicles can transition between land and water modes in about five seconds. The first Gibbs fast amphibian is the Quadski, introduced in October 2012. It went on sale in January 2013.

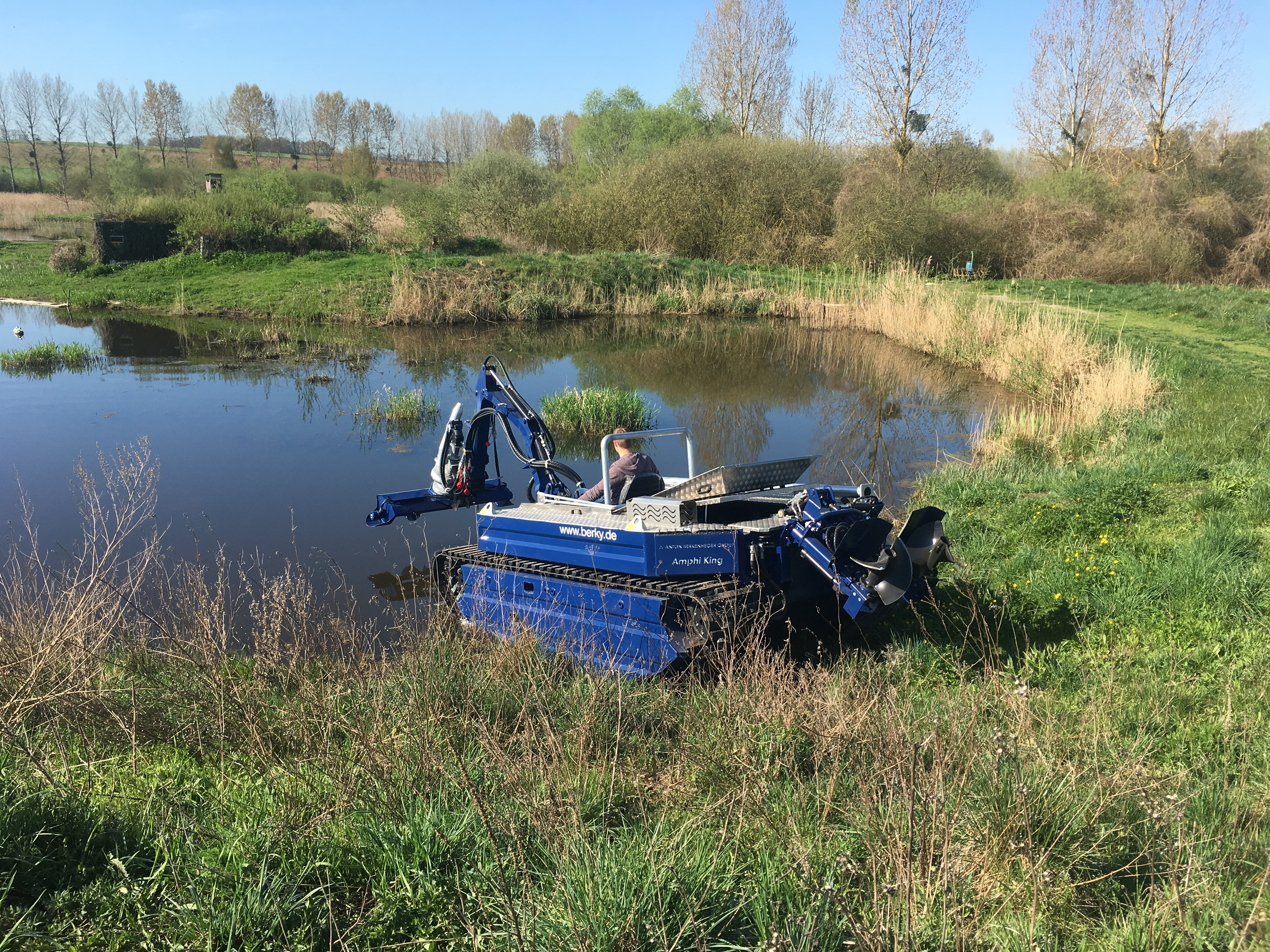
Amphibious boat used for water maintenance

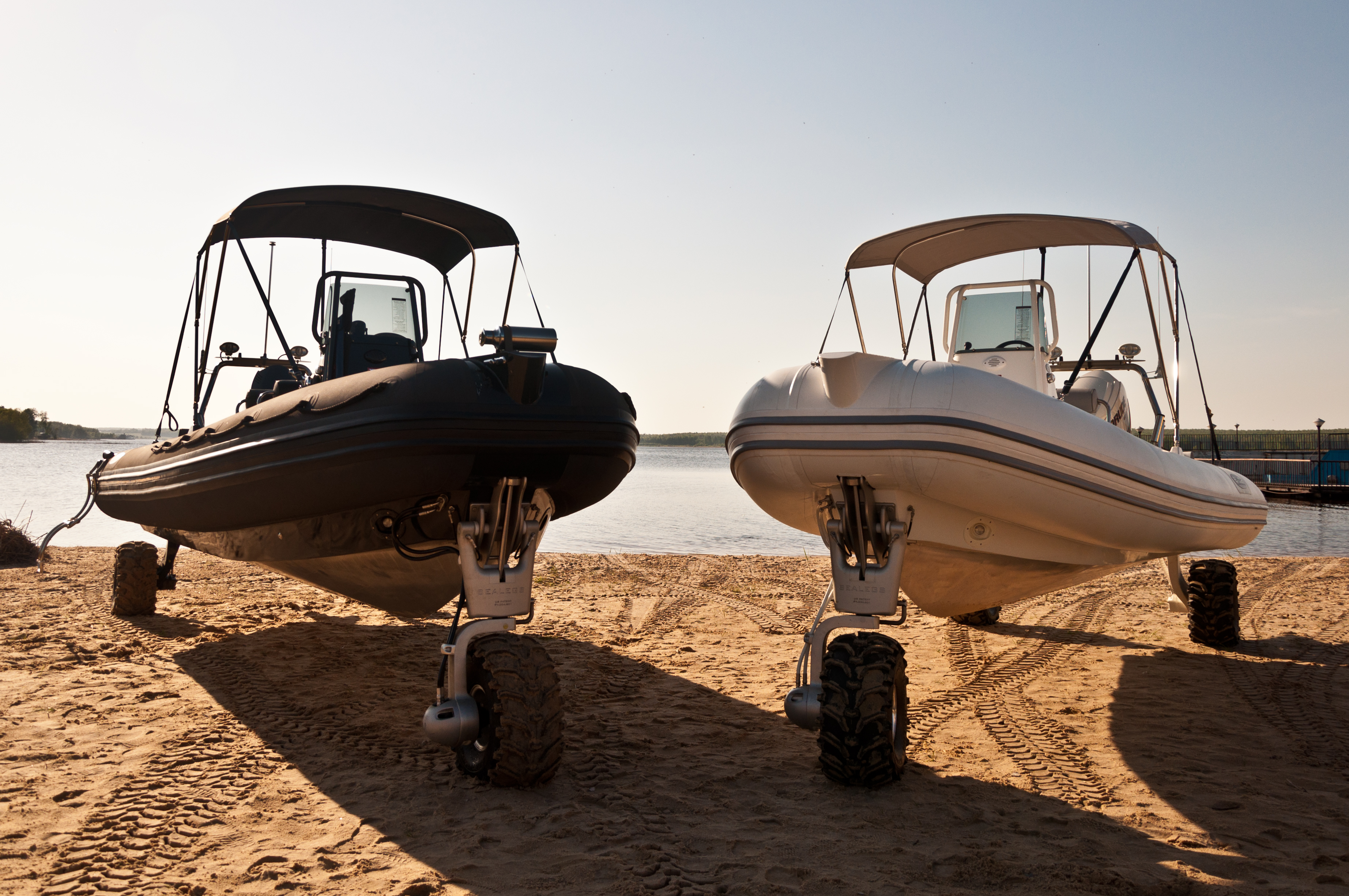
Sealegs Amphibious Craft

===== Oyster boats =====
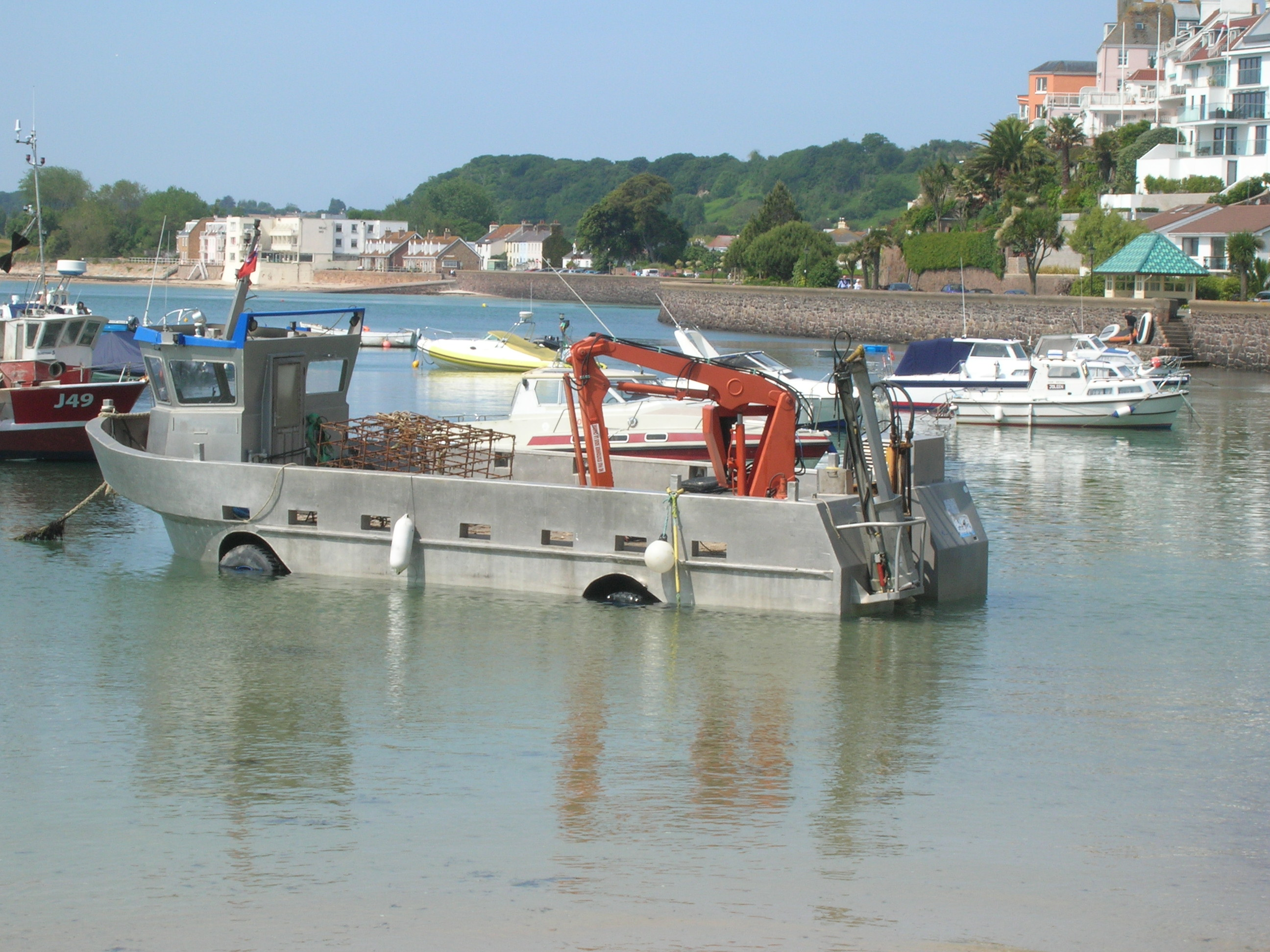
Oyster boat in the harbour at Gorey, Jersey

Since 1977, several boat builders in Brittany have built specialized amphibious vehicles for use in the area's mussel and oyster farming occupations. The boats are made of aluminium, are relatively flat-bottomed, and have three, four, or six wheels, depending on the size of the boat. When the tide is out the boats can run on the tidal flats using their wheels. When the tide is in, they use a propeller to move through the water. Oyster farmers in Jersey make use of similar boats. Currently, Constructions Maritimes du Vivier Amphibie has a range of models.

==== Cargo ====
===== Trucks and barges =====
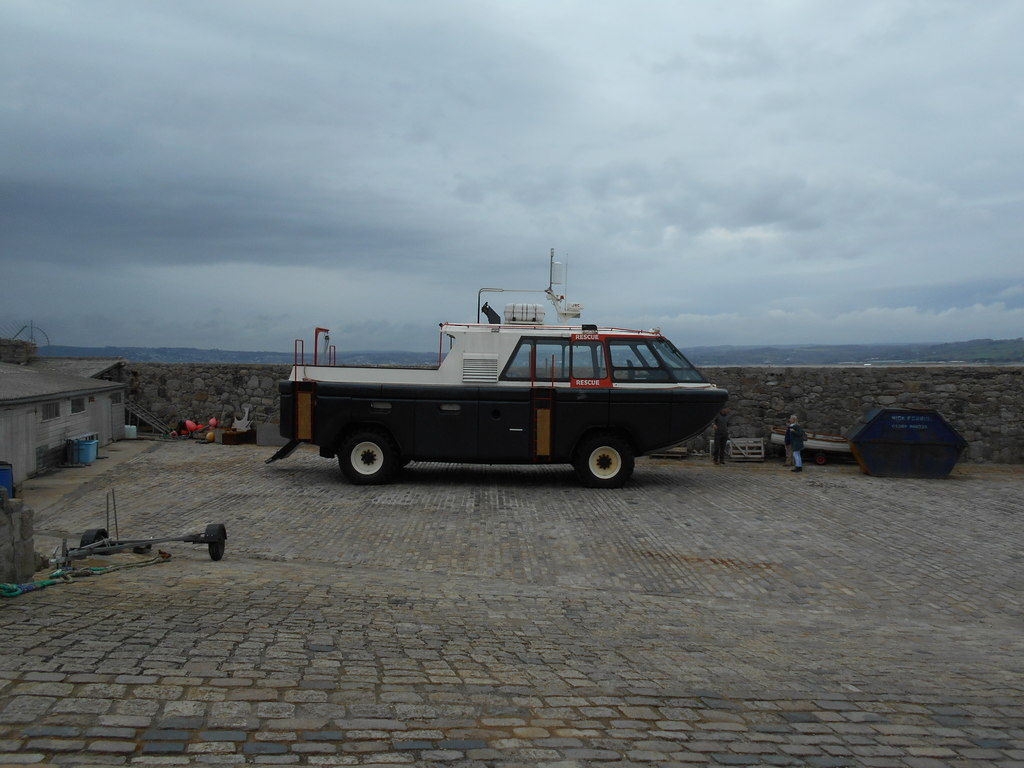
Amphibious vehicle used by coastguard

With more than 20,000 units produced, the DUKW was the most successful amphibious truck of World War II. This 31-foot (9.4 m) 6×6 truck was used to establish and supply beachheads. It was designed as a wartime project by Sparkman & Stephens, a yacht design firm who also designed the hull for the Ford GPA 'Seep'. Britain developed the Terrapin 8×8 amphibious cargo carrier which was used by 79th Armoured Division during the Walcheren campaign. While offering greater capacity than the DUKW, ease of operation favoured the DUKW. An improved version of the Terrapin never got beyond prototype stage. During the war, Germany produced the Landwasserschlepper. In the 1950s, the Soviets developed the GAZ-46, BAV 485, and PTS.

During the Vietnam War, the US Army used the amphibious articulated Gama Goat and the larger M520 Goer truck-series to move supplies through the canals and rice paddies of Southeast Asia. The latter was based on a 1950s civil construction vehicle and became the US Army's standard heavy tactical truck before its replacement by the HEMTT. Although the vehicles' wheels were mounted without suspension or steering action, and land speeds over 20 mph (32 km/h) were ill-advised, its articulated design provided it with good maneuverability and helped it to keep all four wheels firmly in touch with uneven ground. Coupled with its amphibious capability, in the Vietnam War, the M520 Goer developed a reputation of being able to go where other trucks could not.

For taking vehicles and supplies onto the beaches the US used the 1950s designed LARC-V and the huge LARC-LX which could carry 60 tons of cargo.

The British Army used the 6×6 wheeled Alvis Stalwart as their amphibious cargo carrier. In the water vectored thrust water-jet propulsion units drove it along at about 6 knots.

The M3 Amphibious Rig can be used as a ferry or as a floating bridge for trucks and heavy combat vehicles.

Gibbs has also developed other types of fast amphibians including the Phibian, a 30-foot (9.1 m) amphibian that is aimed at first responder market, and the Humdinga, a 21-foot (6.4 m) amphibian that is capable of traversing extreme terrain.

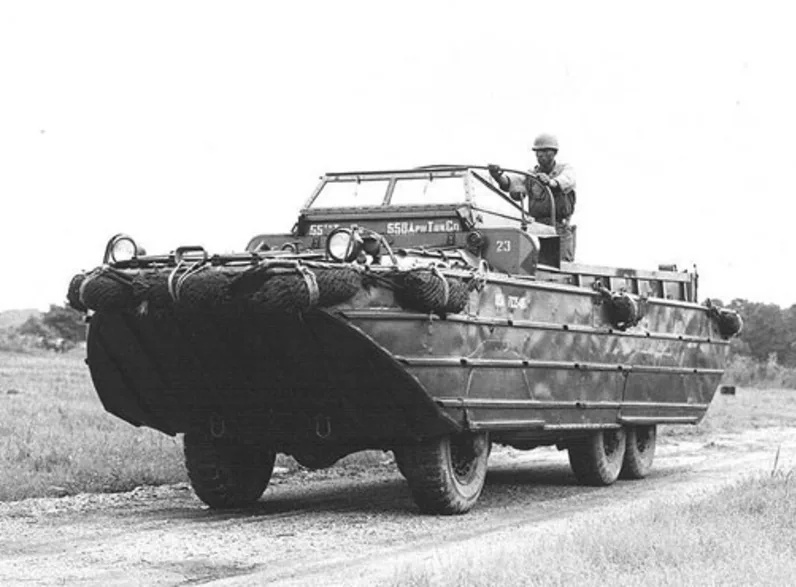
A DUKW during World War II

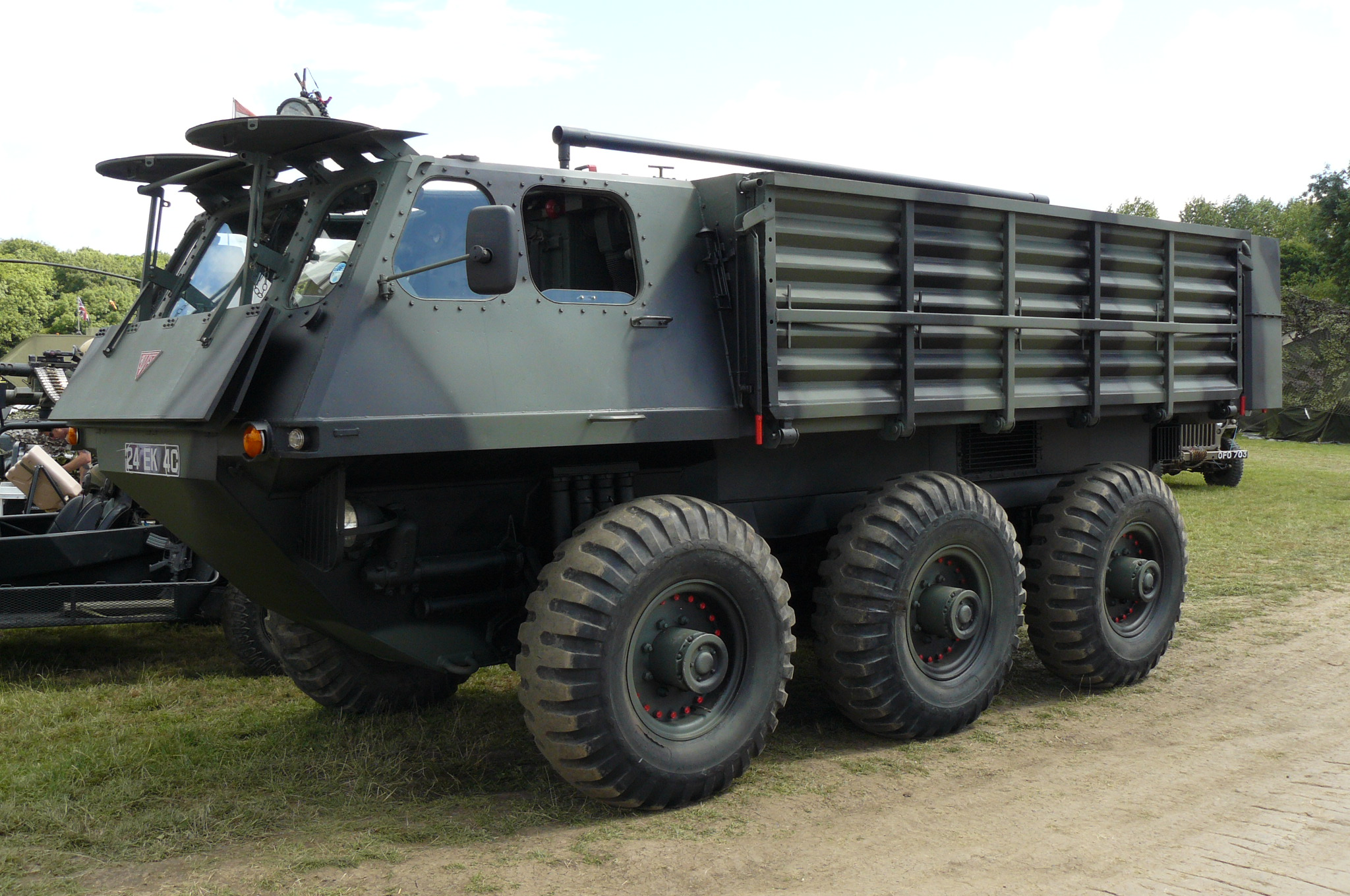
A British Alvis Stalwart

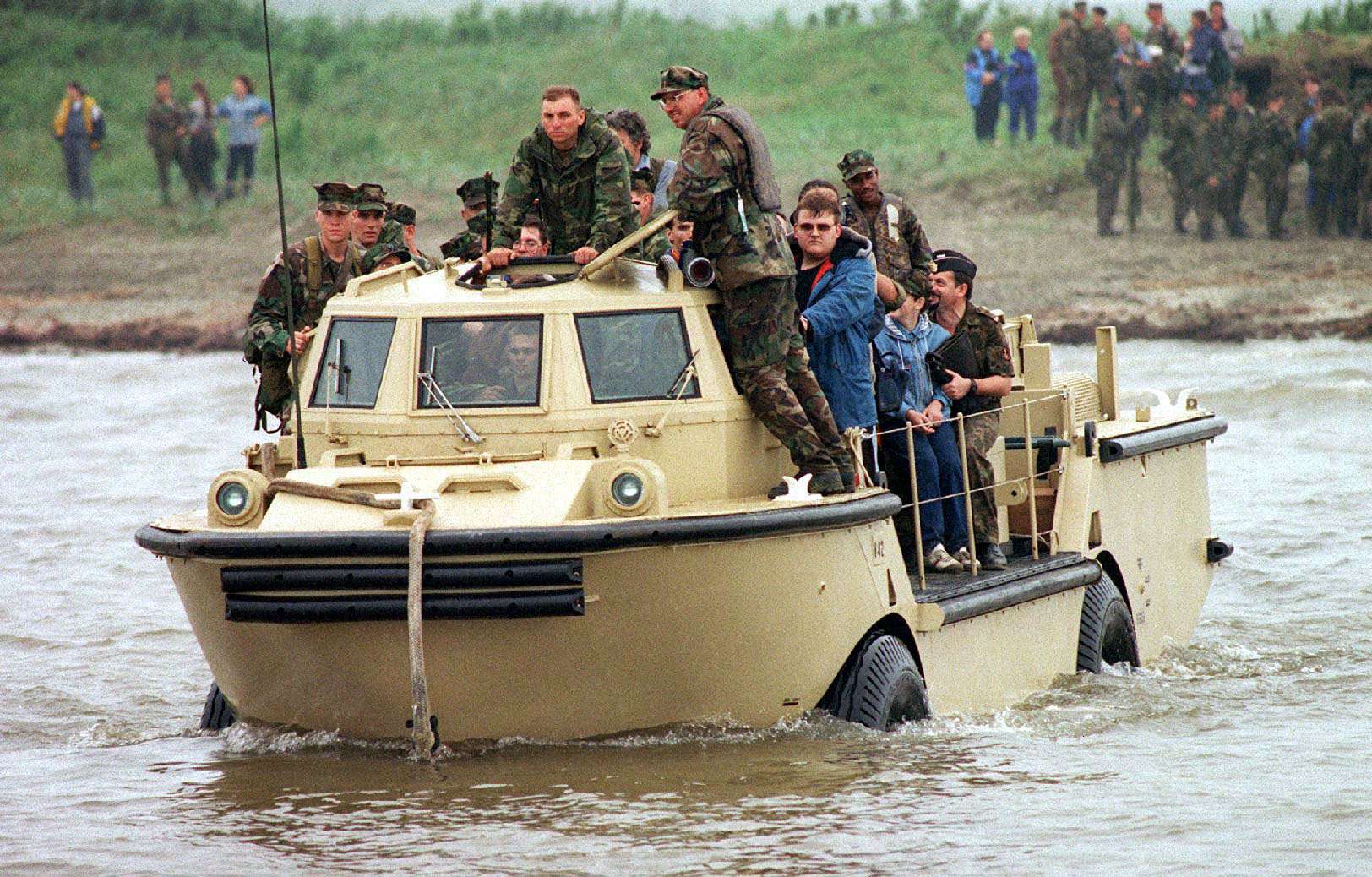
A LARC-V 5-ton U.S. amphibious cargo vehicle

=== Armoured ===
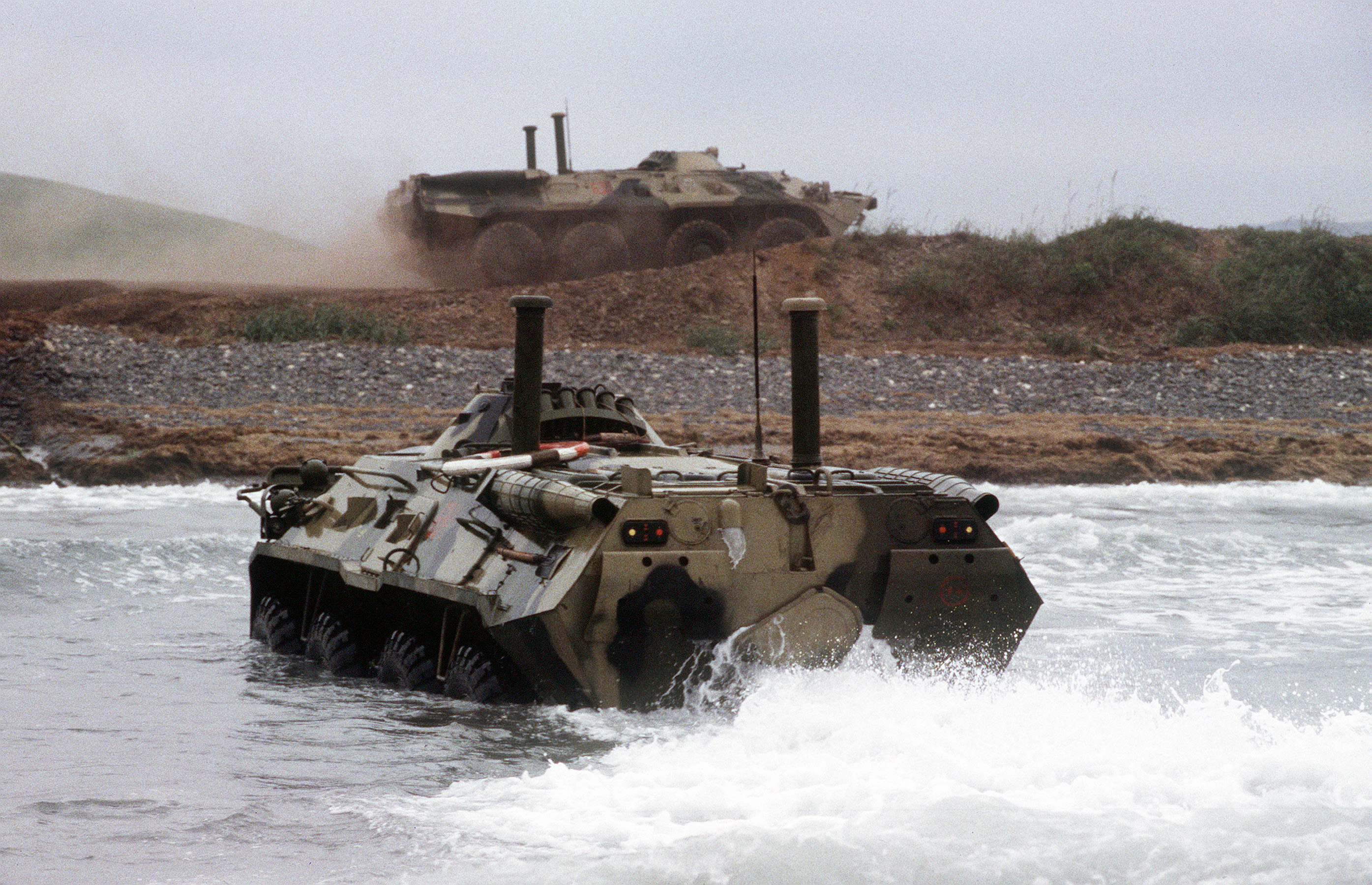
BTR-80s coming ashore, engine snorkels and waterjet deployed

Many modern military vehicles, ranging from light wheeled command and reconnaissance vehicles, through armoured personnel carriers (APCs), tanks and amphibious warfare ships, are manufactured with amphibious capabilities.

The French Panhard VBL is a compact, lightly armoured 4×4 all-terrain vehicle that is fully amphibious and can swim at 5.4 km/h (3.4 mph). The VAB is a French fully amphibious APC, powered in the water by two water jets, mounted one on either side of the rear hull (see detail picture above). It entered service in 1976 and around 5000 were produced in many configurations.

During the Cold War the Soviet bloc states developed a number of amphibious APCs, fighting vehicles and tanks, both wheeled and tracked. Most of the vehicles the Soviets designed were amphibious or could ford deep water. Wheeled examples are the BRDM-1 and BRDM-2 4×4 armoured scout cars, as well as the BTR-60, BTR-70, BTR-80 and BTR-94 8×8 APCs and the BTR-90 infantry fighting vehicle.

== Tracked ==
=== Unarmored ===
==== M29 Weasel ====
The M29 Weasel (Studebaker Weasel), whilst originally designed as a snow vehicle, operated successfully in an amphibious role by the addition of front and rear floats: the M29C Water Weasel. The basic vehicle will float but its bow is square so the additional floats add stability and load carrying capacity.

=== Armored ===
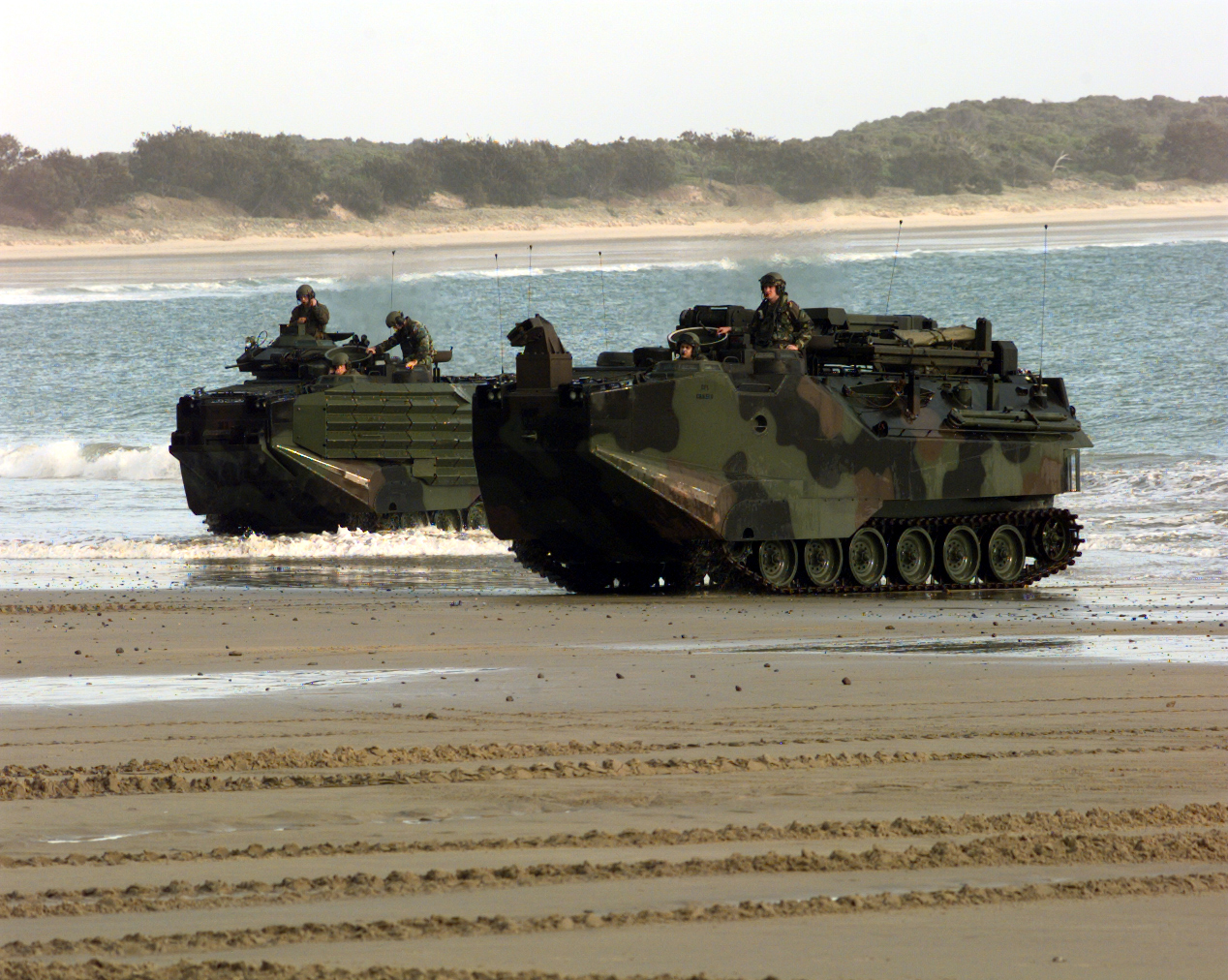
Two U.S. Marine Corps AAV-7s emerge from the Aberdeen.

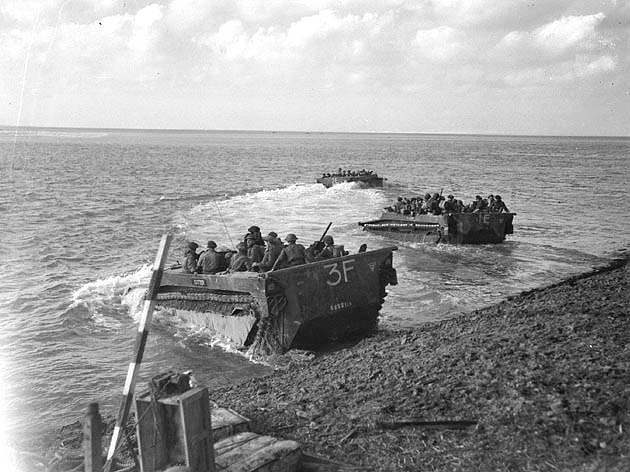
LVT 'Buffalos' taking Canadian troops across the Scheldt in 1944

Tracked armored vehicles with amphibious capabilities include those that are intended for use in amphibious assault. The United States started developing a long line of LVT (Landing Vehicle Tracked) designs from around 1940.

Many tracked armored vehicles that are primarily intended for land-use, such as armoured fighting vehicles and armoured personnel carriers nevertheless also have amphibious ability, tactically useful inland, reducing dependence on destroyable and easily targeted bridges. To provide motive power, they use their tracks, sometimes with an added propeller or water jets. As long as the opposite bank has a shallow enough slope for the vehicle to climb out within a few miles, they can cross rivers and water obstacles. An American example is the M113 Armored Personnel Carrier. Soviet examples are the PT-76 amphibious tank, and the BTR-50 and MT-LB APCs based on its chassis.

Some heavier tanks have an amphibious mode in which a fabric skirt is needed to add buoyancy. The Sherman DD tank used in the D-Day invasion had this setup. When in water the waterproof float screen was raised and propellers deployed. The M2 and M3 Bradleys also need such a skirt.

==== Tanks ====
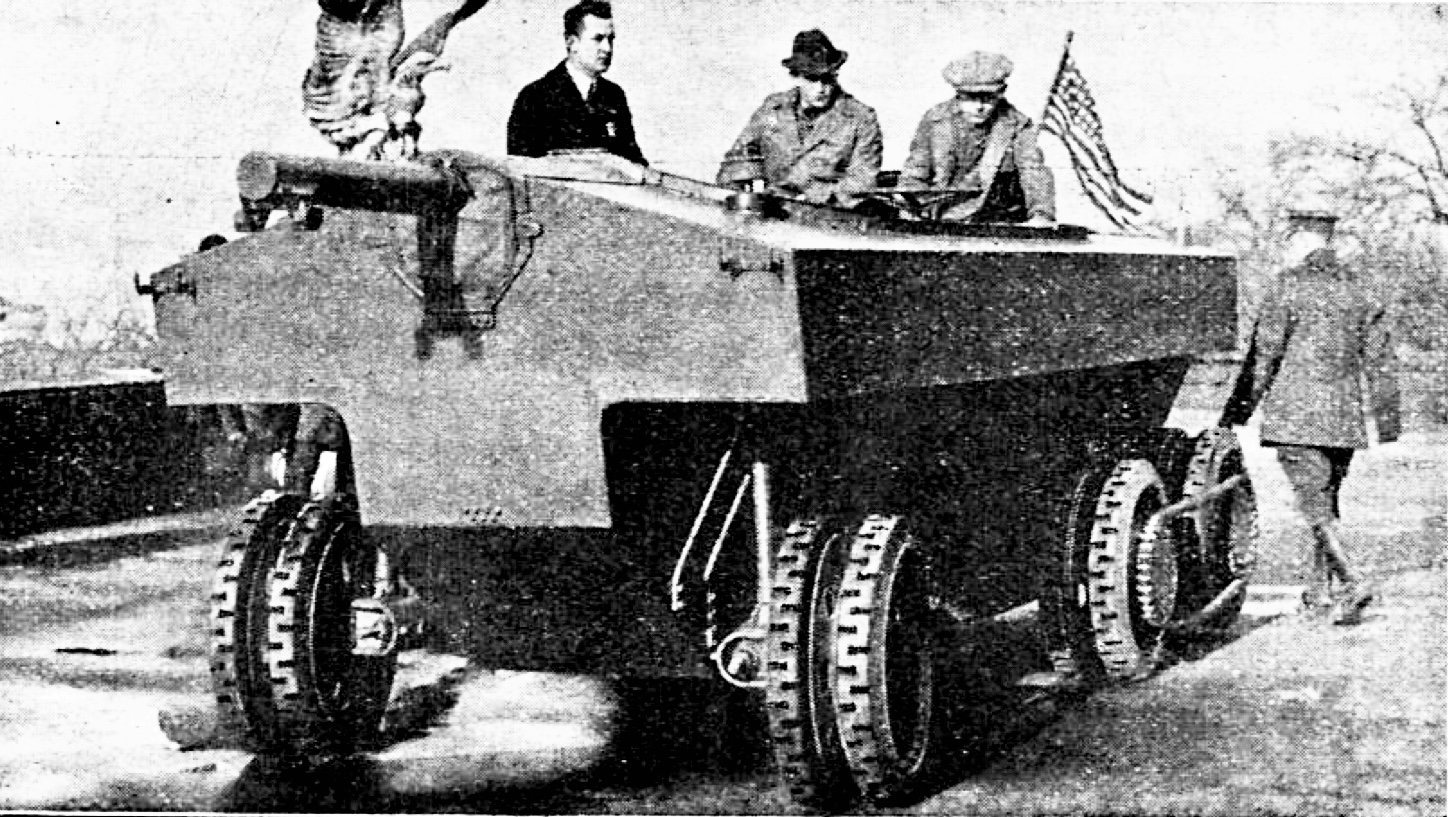
Amphibious Tank

At the end of World War I a Mark IX tank had drums attached to the side and front and was tested as an amphibious vehicle launched into Hendon Reservoir. A modified Medium Mark D successfully swam in a river near Christchurch.

By the early 1930s, Vickers had developed an amphibious tank. By using very thin armour, flotation could be achieved without external buoyancy aids. The British Army trialled the Vickers-Carden-Loyd Light Amphibious Tank but did not adopt it for service use. An order was placed with Vickers by the USSR for a small number of tanks. After negotiations to purchase the Vickers tank by Poland failed, they developed their own design the PZInż 130 but dropped the idea of amphibious tanks as obsolete. A pontoon based tank, the L1E3, was produced by Vickers in 1939. It was tested but further work was halted during WW2. It was tested again at the end of the war.

In World War II the British further developed amphibious tanks. The Crusader was trialled with two pontoons that could be attached or removed, the tracks driving the tank in the water. The "Medium Tank A/T 1" was a tank with inbuilt buoyancy some 24 ft (7.3 m) long and 11 ft (3.4 m) tall. The Valentine, then the M4 Sherman medium tank were made amphibious with the addition of a rubberized canvas screen to provide additional buoyancy and propellers driven by the main engine to give propulsion. These were DD tanks (from "Duplex Drive") and the Sherman DD was used on D-Day to provide close fire support on the beaches during the initial landings. The Sherman DD could not fire when afloat as the buoyancy screen was higher than the gun. A number swamped and sank in the operation, due to rough weather in the English Channel (with some tanks having been launched too far out), and to turning in the current to converge on a specific point on the battlefield, which allowed waves to breach over the screens. Those making it ashore, however, provided essential fire support in the first critical hours.

Before World War II, The Soviets produced light amphibious tanks called the T-37A and T-38. A third serial model, the T-40, started production after the beginning of the war. A 14-ton tank, the PT-1, was created but was not mass-produced. In addition, an attempt was made to attach pontoons to the T-26. While successful, the project was closed due to the high vulnerability and unwieldiness of the construction.

Some light tanks such as the PT-76 are amphibious, typically being propelled in the water by hydrojets or by their tracks. In 1969, the U.S. Army rushed the new M551 Sheridan to Vietnam. This 17-ton light tank was built with an aluminium hull, steel turret, and the 152 mm "gun-launcher" (which could fire the MGM-51 Shillelagh missile), and could swim across bodies of water. The M551 upon arrival in Vietnam began replacing the M48A3 Patton in all cavalry squadrons, leaving only the M48A3 in the U.S. Army's three armored battalions in Vietnam, the 1/77th, 1/69th, and the 2/34th Armor. The Sheridan needed no modifications for river crossings: crewmen simply raised the cloth sides that were tucked inside rubber tubes along the hull's upper edges, raised the driver's front shield which had an acrylic glass window, the driver turned on his bilge pumps, shifted his transmission lever to water operations and the Sheridan entered the water. For newly arrived Sheridans, this might work as engineered. For "war-weary" M551s, the driver's window was often "yellowed" or cracked as to obscure his vision, and the rubber tubes that contained the rolled up side sleeves were often cracked or frozen into place. The Sheridan could still cross a body of water, but like its swimming cousin, the M113 armoured personnel carrier, also built of aluminium, the river had to be narrow, less than 100 yards (100 m). In all cases, the bilge pumps had to be working properly, and even then by the time the Sheridan or the APC reached the other side, water would often fill the insides up to their armoured roofs, spilling through the hatches' cracks and emptying onto the earth once safely ashore. Often a fold-down trim vane is erected to stop water washing over the bow of the tank and thus reducing the risk of the vehicle being swamped via the driver's hatch.

During the Cold War, the Swedish Stridsvagn 103 main battle tank carried flotation gear all the time and was, therefore, theoretically, always amphibious.

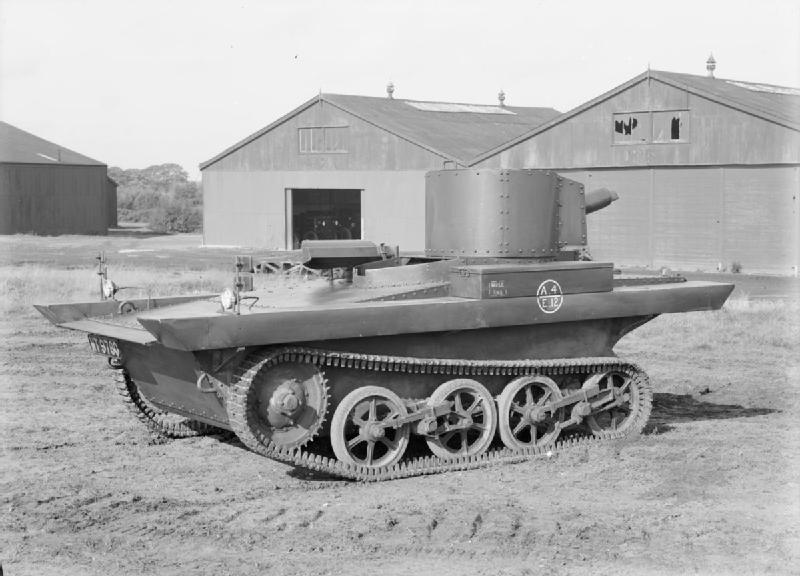
Vickers Carden Loyd amphibious tank

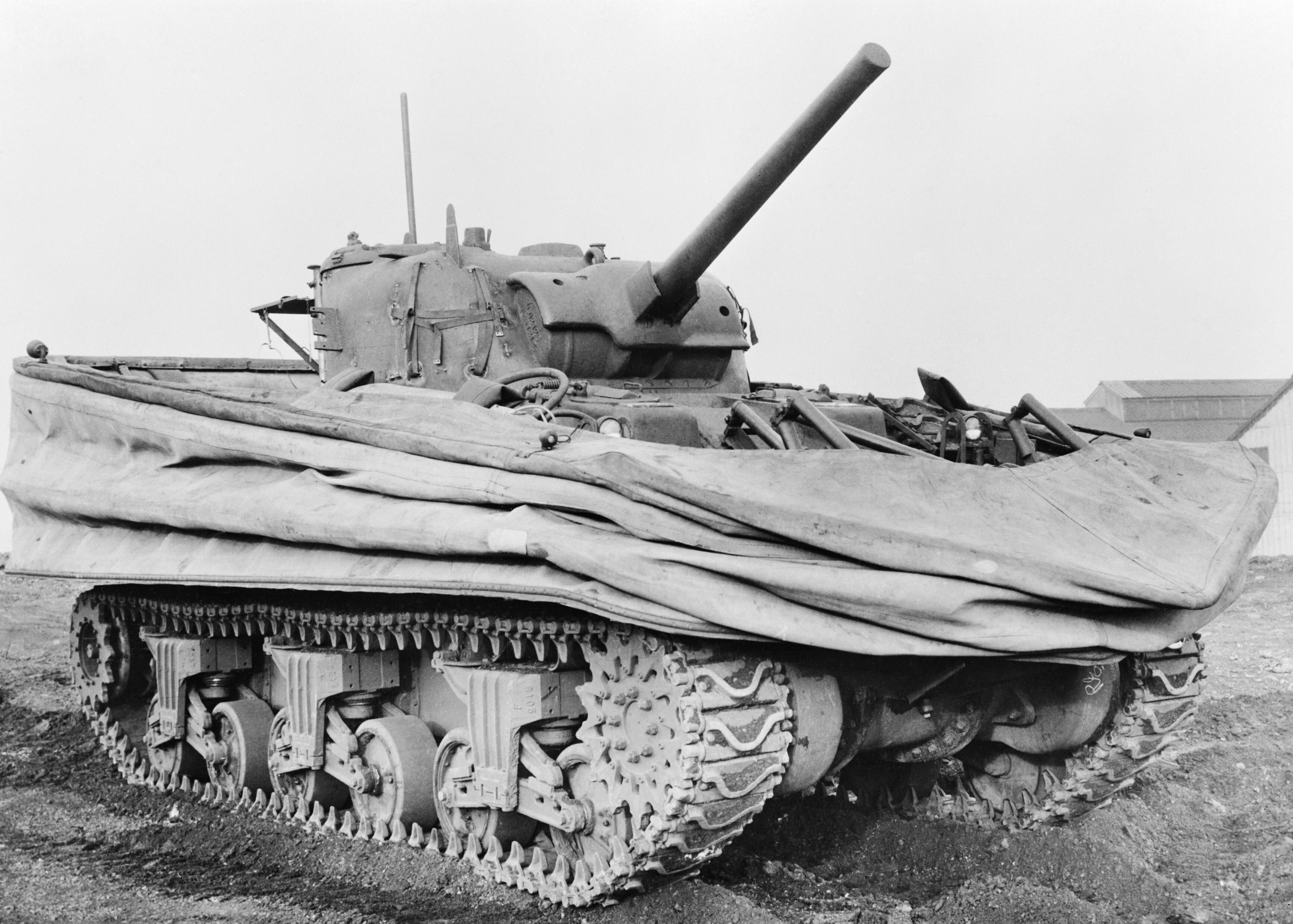
1944 Sherman DD (Duplex Drive) amphibious tank with float screens lowered

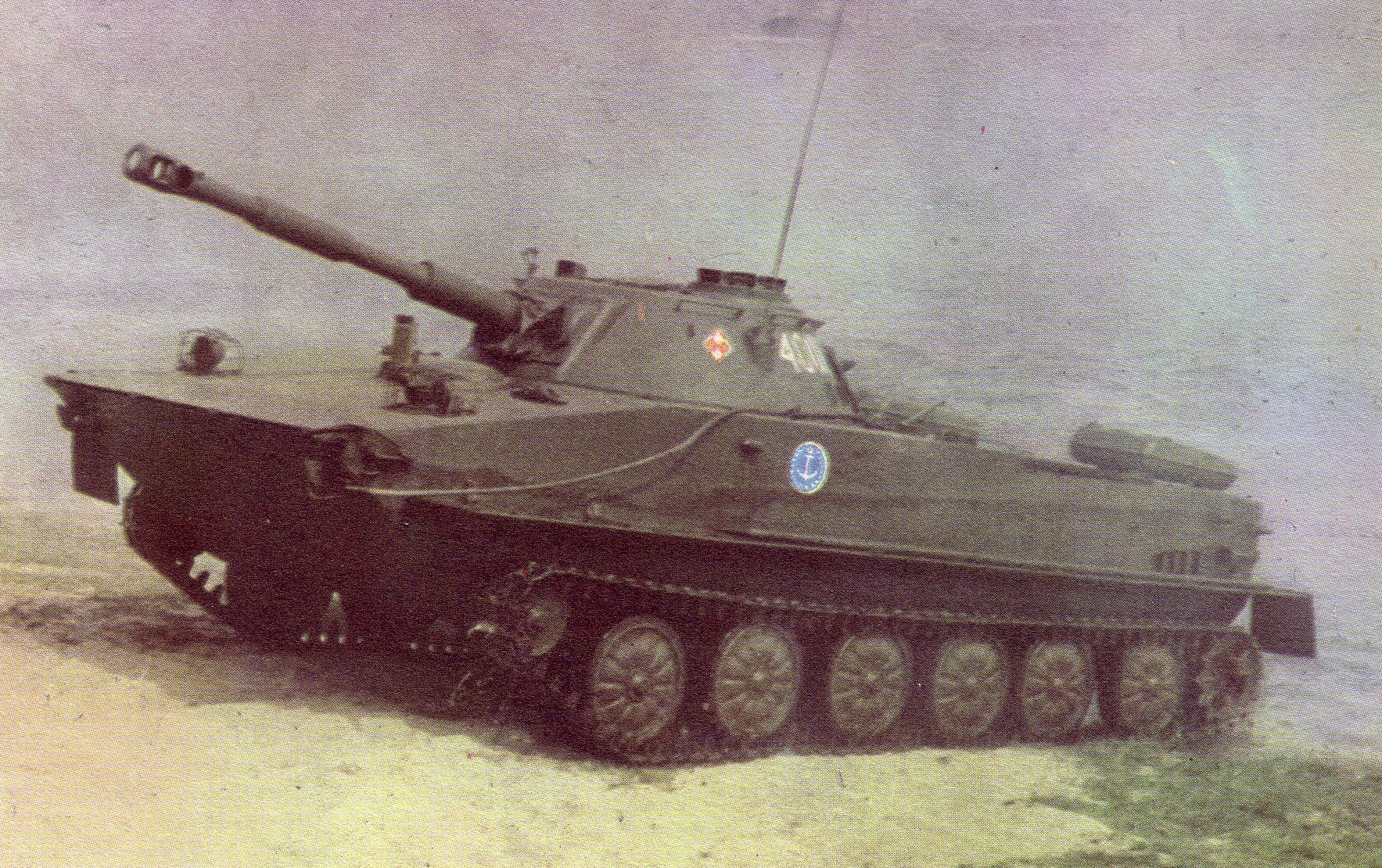
A Polish PT-76 amphibious light tank coming out of the water during an amphibious exercise

=== Multi-unit ===
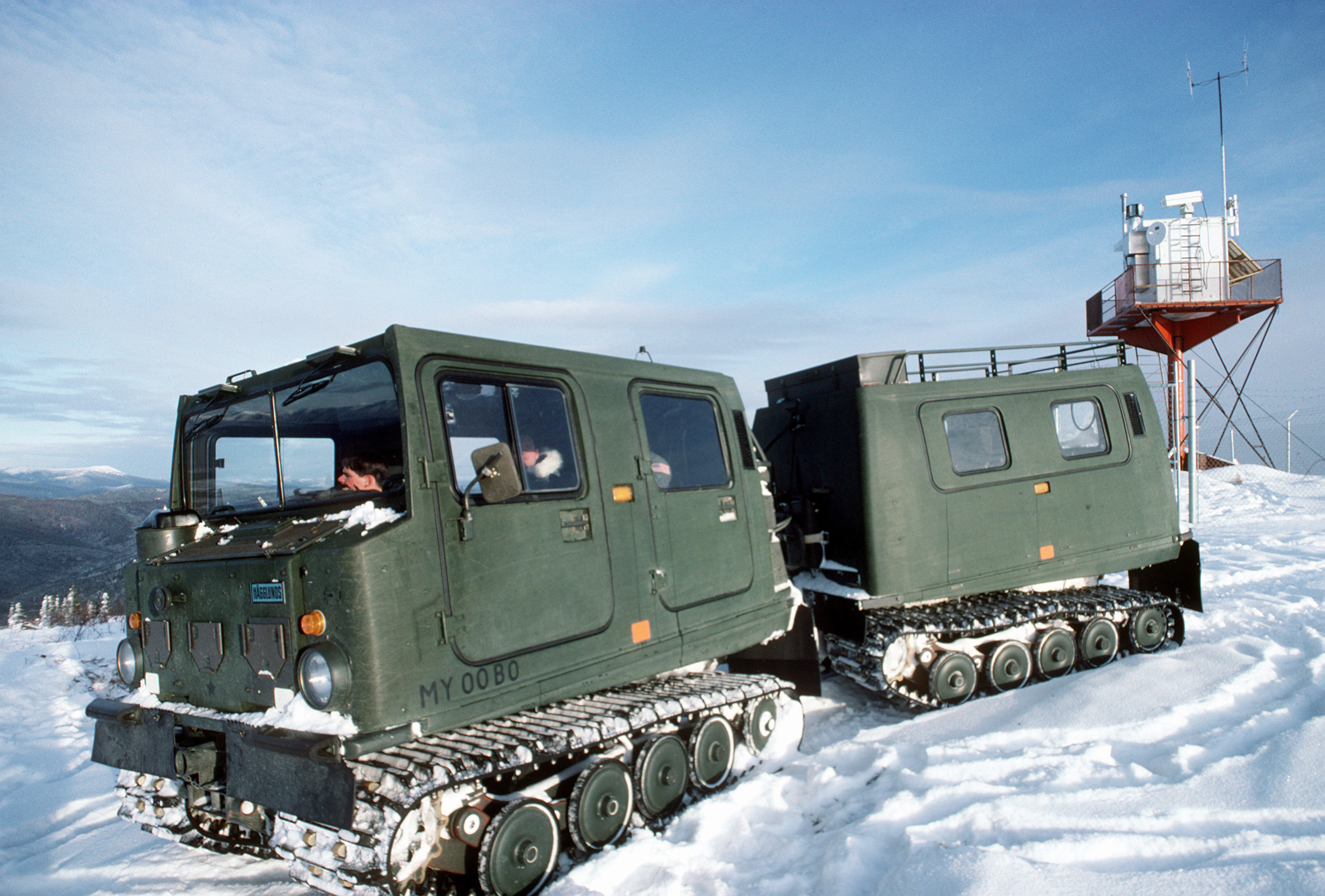
Hagglunds Bv206 in US military service as M-973 SUSV (small unit support vehicle)

According to a 1999 article in Military Parade magazine, multi-unit, all-terrain transport vehicles were first proposed by the British in 1913, and by the 1950s, over 40 types of articulated tracked vehicles (ATV) were in production. The articulated tracked concept is chosen primarily for its combination of high maneuverability, cross-country abilities, and load-carrying capacity. In some cases the design is made amphibious, giving them all-terrain capability in the truest sense. Usually, the front unit houses at least the engine, gearboxes, fuel tank(s) and the driver's compartment, and perhaps there is some space left for cargo or passengers, whereas the rear unit is the primary load carrier.

Examples of this concept are the Russian Vityaz, Swedish Volvo Bv202 and Hagglunds Bv206 designs, and the Bronco All Terrain Tracked Carrier of Singapore.

A highly specialised development is the ARKTOS Craft, that uses a linkage with two joints to connect the two units and each unit having independent drive systems, giving enhanced mobility and redundancy. They are capable of climbing large ice steps from open water.

== Deep fording ==
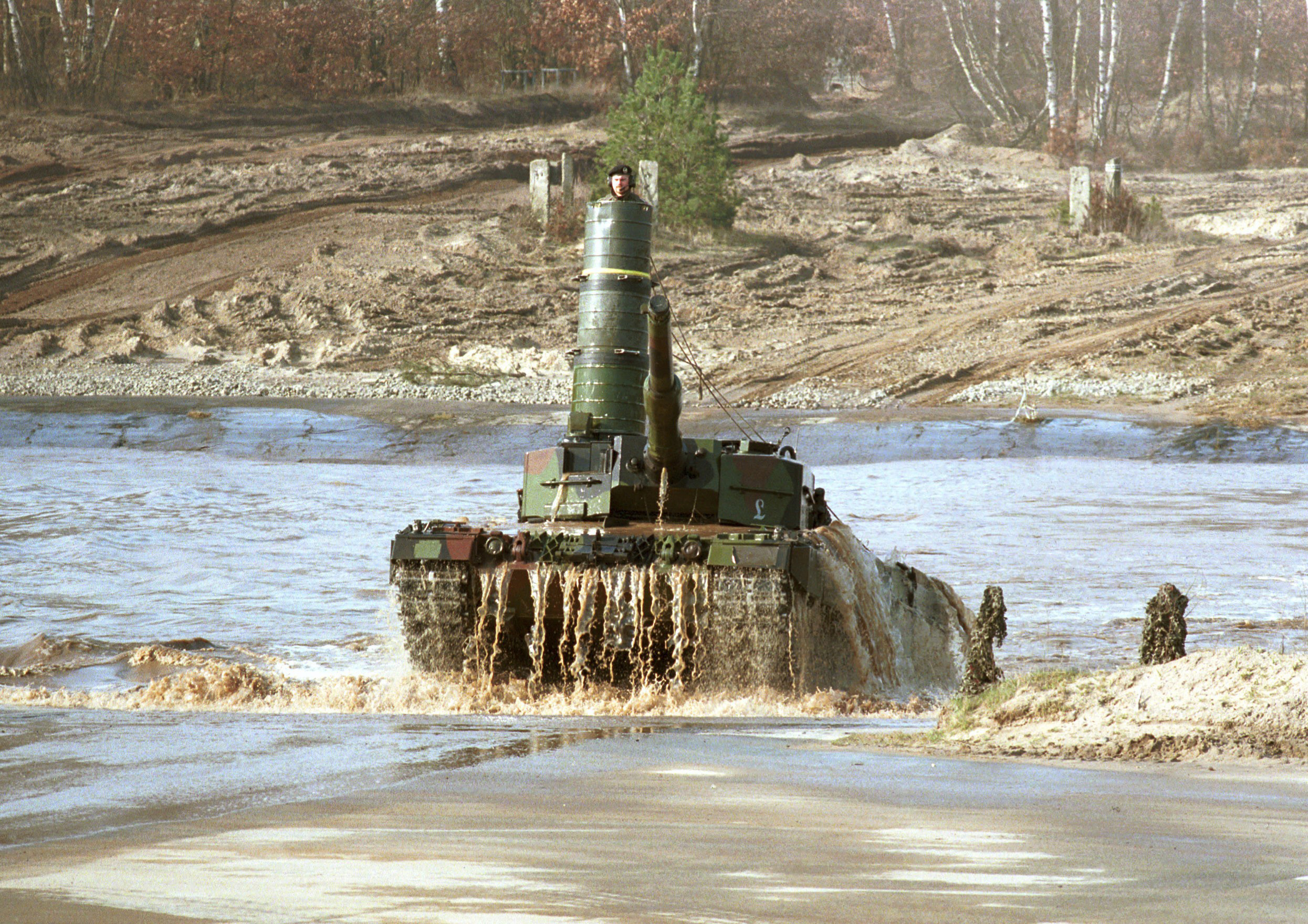
German Leopard 2A4 with turret snorkel, 2010

Some military vehicles are capable of "wading" using waterproof screens to keep the upper hull dry. In World War II the tanks following the Sherman DDs were given waterproofed hulls and trunking was fixed to the engine intakes and exhausts to allow them to come ashore from landing craft in shallow water. The Germans gave their Tiger tank a long snorkel, essentially a long tube on the commander's hatch that allowed it to wade through four metres of water.

The Leopard 2 tank can use a series of rings to create a long tube. This tube is then fitted to the crew commander's hatch and provides air and an escape route for the crew. The height of the tube is limited to around three meters.

The Russian T-90 tank is also able to perform deep fording operations. The Russian snorkel is only a few inches around and does not provide a crew escape path, but it can be stored on the tank.

Some civilian deep wading vehicles achieve their capability by means of legs or stilts to raise the body of the vehicle from its wheels. One example is the sea tractor, a motor vehicle that can travel through shallow water, with driver and passengers on a raised platform. Another is the Brighton and Rottingdean Seashore Electric Railway, a coastline railway that ran on submerged rails through the shallow coastal waters of the English Channel between 1896 and 1901.

== Hovercraft ==
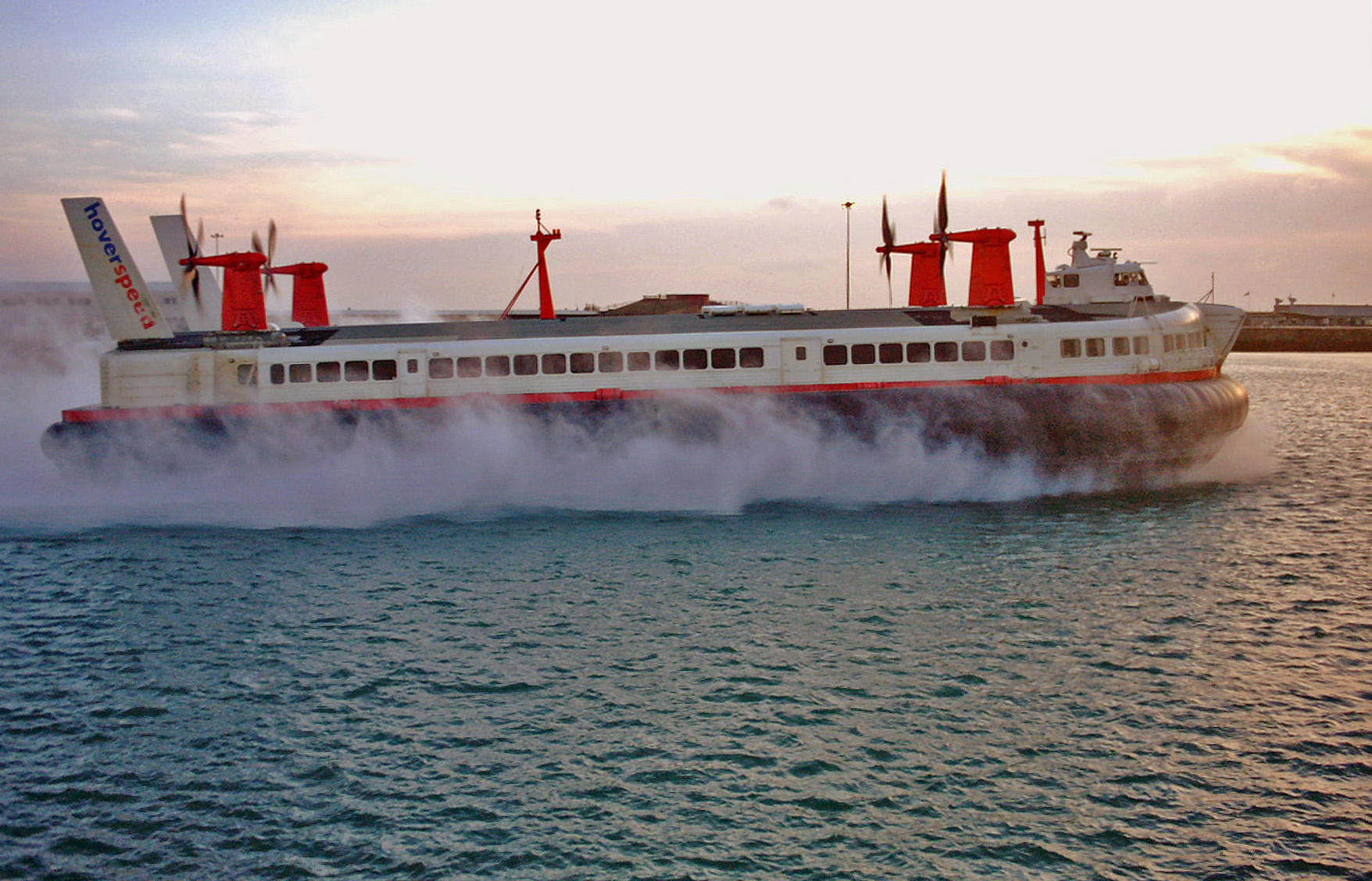
BHC SR.N4 Mk.3, a large civilian hovercraft

An air-cushion vehicle (ACV) or hovercraft can travel over land or water supported by a cushion of air ejected downwards against the surface below it. In principle, a hovercraft can travel over any sufficiently smooth surface: solid, liquid, mixed, or anything in between. Large hovercraft, riding on an air-cushion contained by skirts several meters tall, can deal with obstacles 1 to 2 meters in height. The smallest personal hovercraft are nimble enough to follow some rolling of the terrain.

One of the benefits of this type of amphibious craft is the possibility of making them large – the British-built SR.N4 Mk.3 ferries could carry dozens of vehicles. ACVs have a high speed over water (an SR.N4 Mk.1 could do 83 knots (95 mph or 154 km/h)) and can make the transition between land and water at speed – unlike most wheeled or tracked amphibians. Drawbacks are high fuel consumption and noise levels.

For some military applications wheeled and tracked amphibious vehicles are slowly being supplanted by air-cushioned landing craft. The hovercraft's ability to distribute its laden weight evenly across the surface below it makes it well suited to the role of amphibious landing craft. The US Navy LCAC can take troops and materials (if necessary an M1 Abrams tank) from ship to shore and can access more than 70% of the world's coastline, as opposed to conventional landing craft, which are only capable of landing along 17% of that coastline.

== In media ==
The BBC television series Top Gear has, on several occasions, used amphibious vehicles as the basis for challenges. In S08E03, Clarkson, Hammond and May competed to see who could build the best amphibious car, starting with a used vehicle of their choice. Clarkson used a Toyota Hilux, which he nicknamed the "Toybota", and powered it with a large outboard motor. Hammond used a Volkswagen Vanagon, which he combined with a boat hull to build a drivable cabin cruiser called the "Dampervan". May started with a Triumph Herald and fitted it with a sail. During the challenge, which was to drive across a reservoir, the Toybota made it almost all the way to the end before capsizing, the Dampervan immediately sank, and the Triumph was the only vehicle to complete the trip, although it took a very long time to do so.

The show returned to the concept in S10E02, when the presenters built updated versions of their designs with lessons learned from the first time. Clarkson built his "Nissank" out of a Nissan Hardbody, the overall design being very similar to the Toybota, but now with oil drums as stabilizers. Hammond built a near-identical Dampervan, which had many of the same problems as its predecessor. May used the same actual vehicle as before, with only minor improvements (including a retractable daggerboard). The challenge was to drive the cars across the English Channel. Hammond's vessel sank shortly after departing, and May's couldn't depart due to bad winds (and was "damaged beyond repair" in the attempt, although still seemingly afloat), and as such all three presenters ended up making the trip aboard Clarkson's vehicle. Along the way, they attempted to beat Richard Branson's world record for crossing the channel in an amphibious vehicle, but failed. The pickup truck successfully crossed the channel and landed in France, although they ended up in Sangatte instead of Calais, their intended destination.

Top Gear USA featured a very similar challenge in S04E06. Their vehicles were a Volkswagen Golf, which Rutledge Wood combined with a Sea Ray boat; a Jeep Wrangler YJ, which Adam Ferrara turned into an airboat; and a Plymouth Conquest, which Tanner Foust turned into a speedboat called the "Turboat". In the initial tests, the VW had issues on both water and land, the Jeep worked well on water but not on land (the airboat motor left him stranded on the highway), and the Turboat performed well on land but sank immediately in the water. The Jeep sank as well after Foust and Ferrara got into an impromptu sea battle. All three presenters then attempted to cross Lake Ontario in the VW. Foust abandoned the trip halfway through, being picked up by a friend's yacht. Wood and Ferrara made it to the Canadian border, but were turned away because they did not bring passports.

== See also ==
- Amphibian aircraft
- Amphibious automobile
- Amphibious excavator
- Float (nautical)
- Ekranoplan
- Paddle
