= Vickers-Carden-Loyd light amphibious tank =

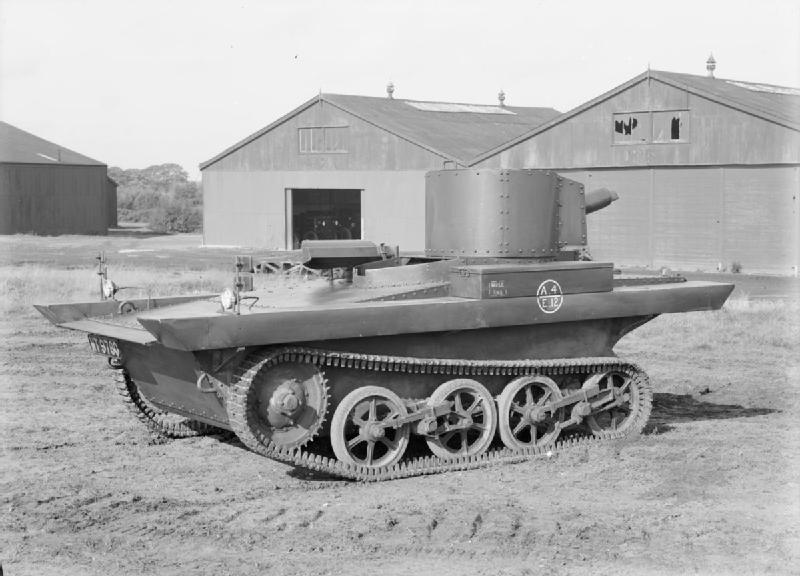
- Type: Amphibious tank
- Place of origin: United Kingdom

Service history
- Used by: see text

Production history
- Designer: Carden-Loyd Tractors Ltd.
- Manufacturer: Vickers-Armstrong
- Produced: 1931–1932

Specifications (A4E11, A4E12)
- Mass: 2.17 long tons (2.20 t)
- Length: 13 ft 4 in (4.06 m)
- Width: 6 ft 9 in (2.06 m) over tracks
- Height: 6 ft 2 in (1.88 m)
- Crew: 2
- Armour: 11 mm (0.43 in)
- Main armament: 0.303 inch Vickers machine gun with 1,000 rounds
- Engine: Meadows petrol 6-cylinder 90 bhp
- Suspension: Horstmann
- Operational range: 100 mi (160 km)
- Maximum speed: 27 mph (43 km/h) on road; 3.72 mph (5.99 km/h) in water

The Vickers-Carden-Loyd light amphibious tank (designated the A4E11 and A4E12 by the War Office), was a series of British experimental pre-World War II light tanks (resembling tankettes), which, although not taken into British service, were sold to a number of other countries which produced modified versions which were then taken into service.

== Users ==
Foreign buyers included China (29 or 32 tanks), Thailand, the Dutch East Indies (two delivered in 1937) and the USSR, with the latter producing some 1200 of the T-37A tanks developed from the A4E11/12. One tank with a licence was sold to Japan. Poland was interested in Vickers-Carden-Loyd amphibious tanks in the 1930s, but negotiations failed and instead the PZInż works started the PZInż 130 project, an indigenous design inspired by the British concept.

== Surviving vehicles ==
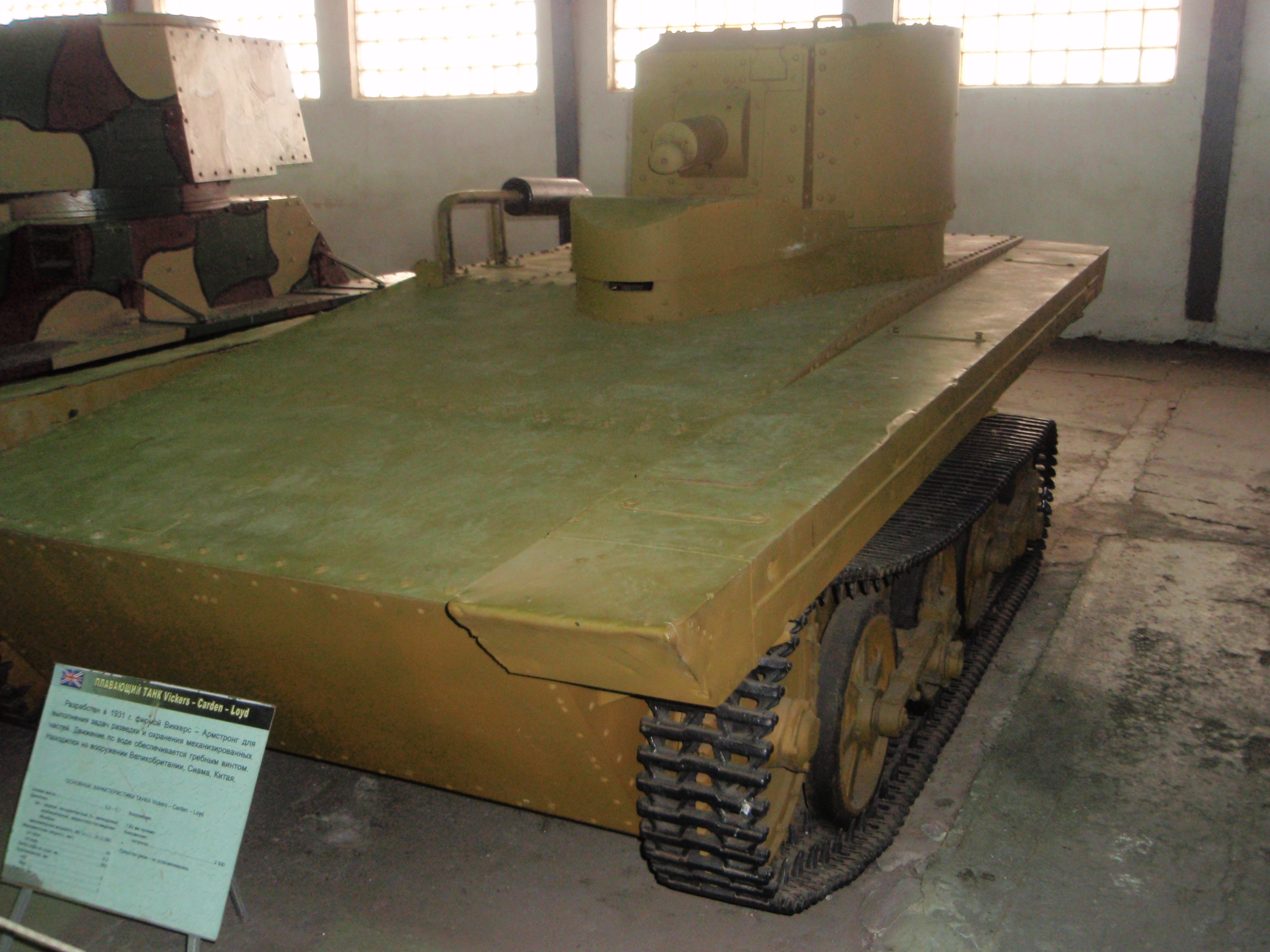
Vickers-Carden-Loyd Amphibious Tank in Kubinka Tank Museum

- Russia: The only surviving tank is in the Kubinka Tank Museum.
