= PZInż 130 =

Polish prototype amphibious tank

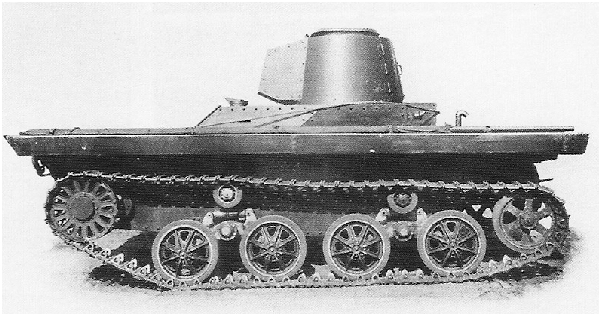
The prototype of the PZInż 130 was unarmed and had a temporary mild steel turret installed for trials

PZInż 130 was a prototype of Polish amphibious tank of the 1930s. Only a single prototype was built.

== Development ==
In the early 1930s Poland was briefly interested in the British tank and tankette designs. The Polish Army wanted to buy a number of Vickers-Carden-Loyd Light Amphibious Tanks, but the negotiations failed. However, Edward Habich of the Państwowe Zakłady Inżynieryjne was asked to prepare a similar amphibious tank design to test its feasibility.

The resulting PZInż 130 project was inspired by British design, but was entirely an independent idea. The basic structure, chassis and undercarriage were identical to those used by Habich in his PZInż 140, which eventually became the 4TP light tank. The prototype was delivered to the Polish Army on 2 October 1937. Extensively tested, during trials it covered over 3,500 kilometres (2,200 mi) without a serious defect. However, by May 1939 it became apparent that the very idea of a light amphibious tank was obsolete and the Army decided not to order the PZInż 130. The prototype was stored in the Ursus Factory, where it was captured by the Germans during the invasion of Poland. Its later fate remains unknown.

== See also ==
- T-37A tank
- Vickers-Carden-Loyd Light Amphibious Tank
