= Amphibious excavator =

Excavator capable of operation on water

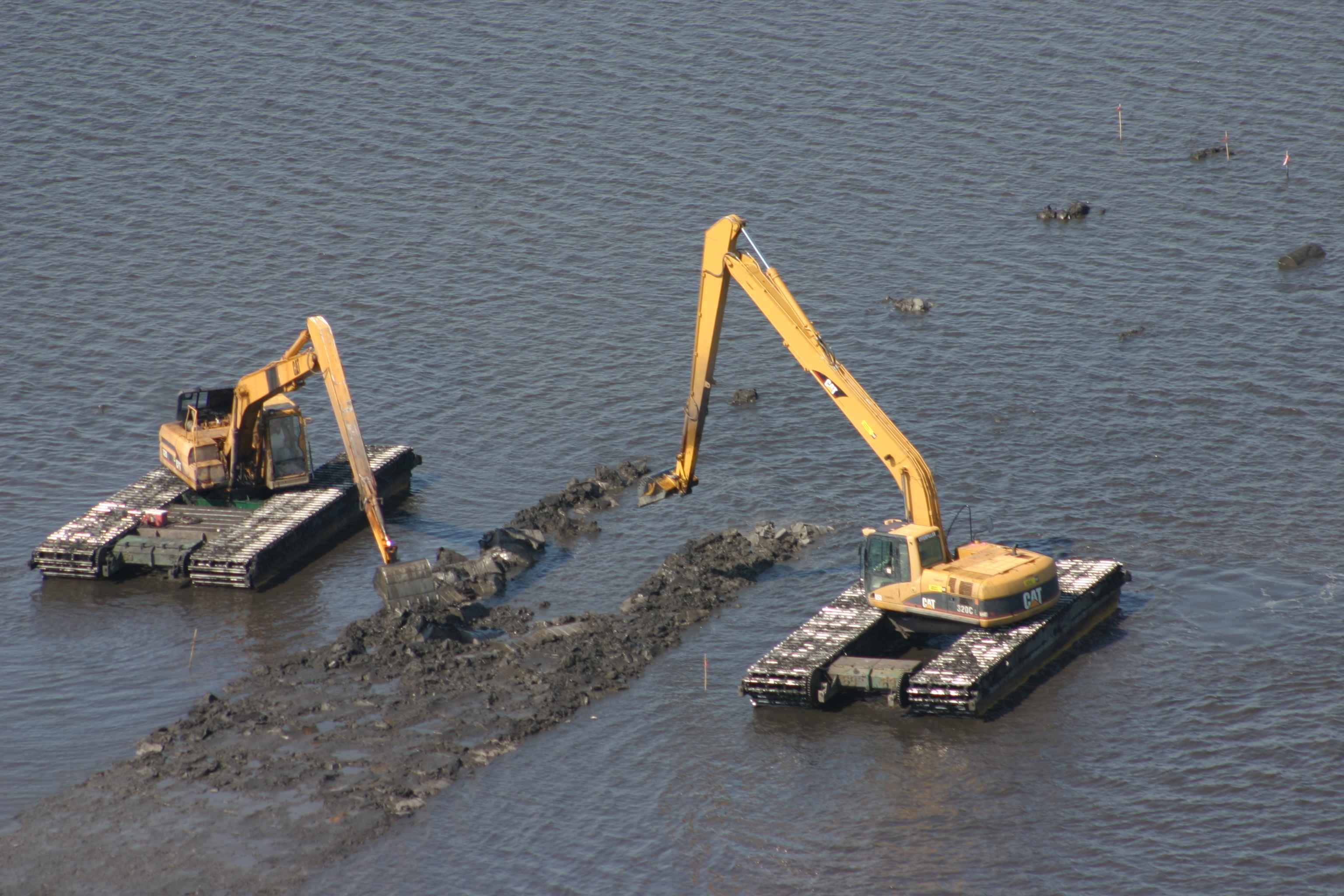
Building duck wing terraces with amphibious excavators

Amphibious excavators are highly specialized construction machines engineered to operate efficiently in wet, marshy, or flooded environments. Their unique design allows them to perform tasks both on land and in water, offering unmatched versatility for a wide range of industries, including environmental conservation, civil engineering, and water management.

== Design and key features ==
Amphibious excavators are equipped with a distinctive undercarriage comprising large pontoons or tracks that create low ground pressure. This innovative design enables the machines to float in shallow waters while maintaining stability on soft or unstable terrains. Key characteristics include a low ground pressure that prevents sinking into soft or muddy ground, modular pontoon systems that can be adapted for deeper water operations, and compatibility with various attachments like dredge pumps and vegetation management tools. They are also environmentally adaptable, allowing them to operate in delicate ecosystems with minimal disruption.

== Operating areas ==
Amphibious excavators are used in a variety of industries. In civil and water engineering, they are essential for dredging waterways, maintaining canals and levees, and protecting areas from flooding by mitigating water flow. These machines are also invaluable for environmental conservation projects such as wetland restoration, managing aquatic vegetation, and preserving habitats in ecologically sensitive areas. Their ability to operate in disaster zones makes them critical for post-flood recovery and clearing debris in damaged waterways.

== Advantages ==
The advantages of amphibious excavators include their versatility to transition seamlessly between land and water, their minimal ecological impact, and their operational stability due to floating pontoons and adjustable buoyancy systems. They are also cost-effective as they can reduce the need for additional equipment like barges. The modular design allows for easy disassembly and transport to remote or challenging locations.

== ES-TRIN certification ==
Amphibious excavators operating in Europe must adhere to ES-TRIN, the European Standard for Technical Requirements for Inland Navigation Vessels. This certification ensures that machines meet stringent safety, environmental, and operational standards. Compliance includes adherence to environmental regulations, implementation of safety measures such as stability and emergency floatation systems, and operational suitability for professional use in regulated waterways. An ES-TRIN-certified excavator not only ensures regulatory compliance but also enhances trust and credibility in international markets.

As global environmental and water management challenges continue to grow, the demand for amphibious excavators is expected to increase. Their ability to adapt to both terrestrial and aquatic environments, combined with regulatory compliance, positions them as vital tools for sustainable development, disaster resilience, and the management of complex modern infrastructure and conservation projects. With ongoing advancements in technology, these machines are becoming even more efficient, environmentally friendly, and versatile, ensuring their role as indispensable assets in addressing future challenges.

== Accessories ==
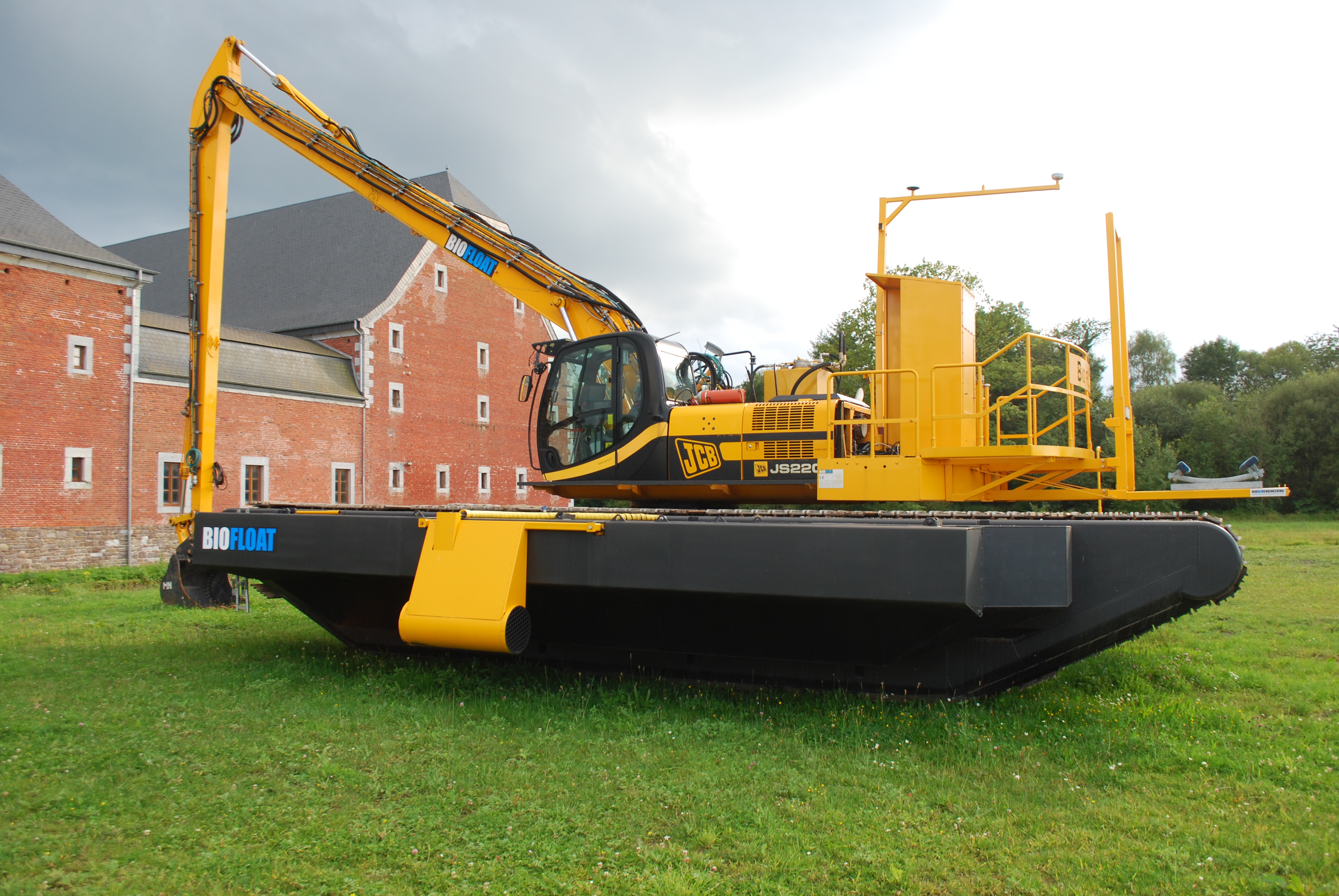
JCB Amphibious Excavator

- Tilt bucket
- Mowing bucket
- Mechanical tree cutter
- Sorting grab
- Quick coupler
- Extra fuel tank (with platform)
- Platform/ railing
- Dredge pump
- Power pack

== See also ==
- Crawler excavator
