= Ford GPA =

US amphibious jeep

Ford GPA 'Seep' (Sea Jeep)
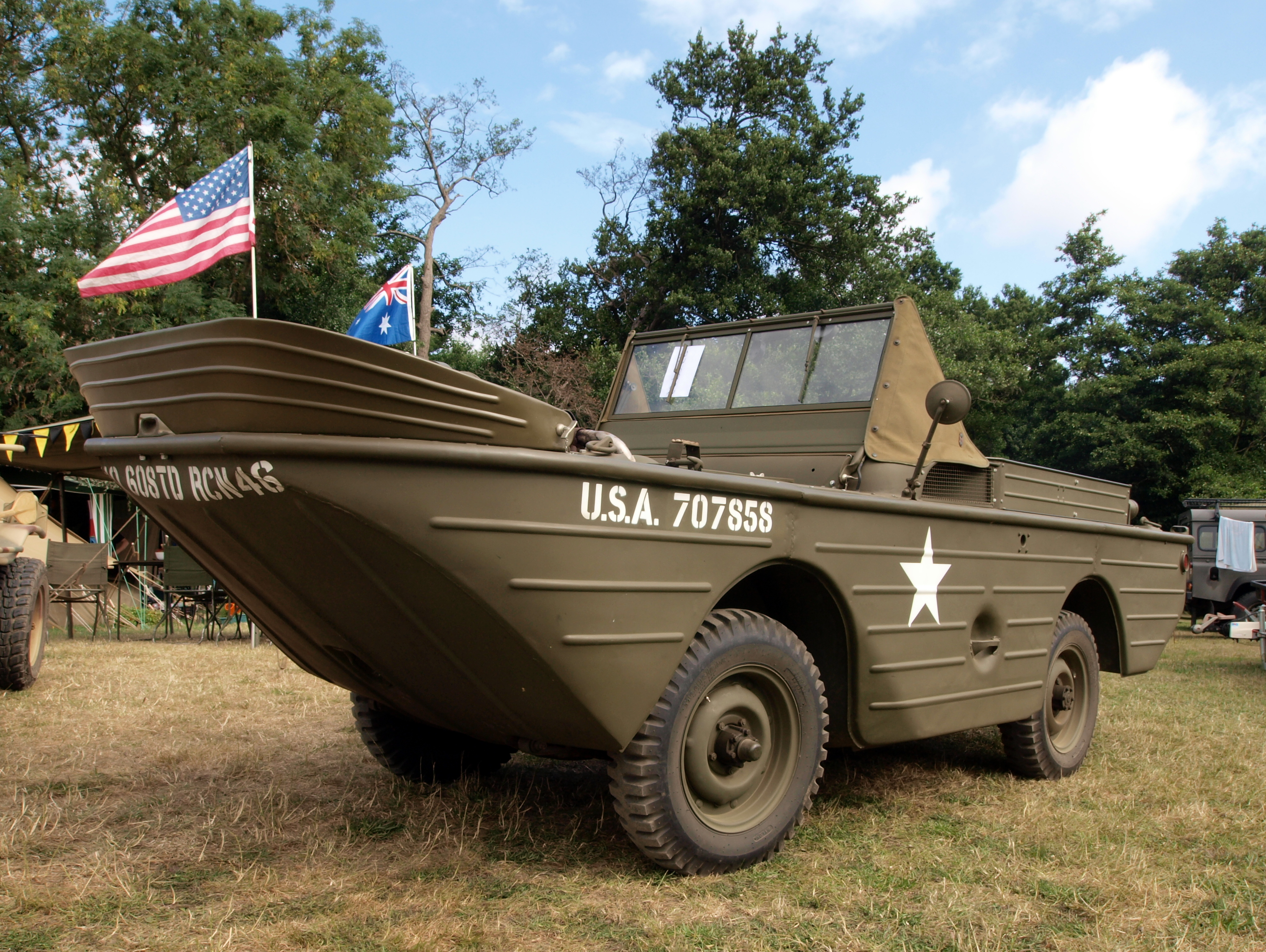

Overview
- Manufacturer: Ford
- Production: 1942–1943; 12,778 built
- Assembly: United States

Body and chassis
- Class: Amphibious military utility vehicle
- Layout: front-engine RWD / 4×4
- Platform: Ford GP
- Related: GAZ-46 (MAV)

Powertrain
- Engine: 4-cyl. side valves; 134 cu in (2,200 cc), 60 hp
- Transmission: 3-speed + 2-speed transfer case; Low range engages FWD; PTO propeller drive

Dimensions
- Wheelbase: 84 inches (2.13 m)
- Length: 182 inches (4.62 m)
- Width: 64 inches (1.63 m)
- Height: 69 inches (1.75 m); 45 inches (1.14 m) reducible
- Curb weight: 2,450 lb (1,110 kg); 3,550 lb (1,610 kg) GWV

The Ford GPA "Seep" (Government 'P' Amphibious, where 'P' stood for its 80-inch wheelbase), with supply catalog number G504, was an amphibious version of the World War II Ford GPW jeep. Over 12,000 were made, serving with Allied forces in World War II, from D-day onwards, throughout Europe and the Pacific theatres. After the war as surplus they found many niche roles, and today examples can be found in museums collections or at military history shows.

Design features concept was similar to the larger and successful DUKW amphibious 2 1/2-ton truck were used on the GPA, but unlike these and the jeep, the 'seep' was not as successful a design. It was considered too slow and heavy on land, and lacked sufficient seagoing abilities in open water, due mainly to its low freeboard. Despite this it did have widespread use across the theatres of WW2.

The Soviet Union received one third of the total GPA production under Lend Lease, and were sufficiently satisfied with its ability to cross calmer inland waters, that they produced their own influenced variant GAZ-46 based on operations and feedback with the Ford GPA.

== History and development ==
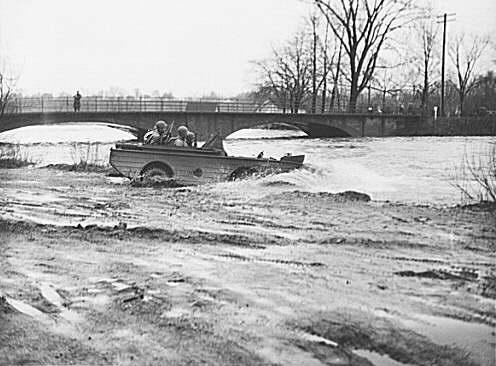
Wartime Ford GPA trials in the Detroit area

After having commissioned Willys, Ford and Bantam to build the first 4,500 jeeps (1500 each) in March 1941, the US Motor Transport Board set up a project under the direction of the National Defense Research Committee (NDRC) to be designated "QMC-4 1/4 Ton Truck Light Amphibian".

Roderick Stephens Jr. of Sparkman & Stephens Inc. yacht designers was asked to design a shape for a 2,700-pound (1,200 kg) amphibious jeep, in the same vein as his later design for the DUKW six-wheel-drive amphibious truck. Stephens' hull design looked like a miniature version of that of the DUKW, and just like it, the 'Seep' was going to have a screw propeller, driven by a power take-off, operating in a dedicated tunnel faired into the rear end bodywork, as well as a proper rudder.

The construction of the vehicle was developed in competition by Marmon-Herrington and Ford Motor Company. Marmon-Herrington specialized in all-wheel-drive vehicles. The Marmon-Herrington prototype's hull formed an integral unibody structure, created by cutting shapes out of steel sheet and welding those together. The Ford entry, however, used a sturdy chassis and internal frame, to which more or less regular automobile type sheet-steel was welded. This construction made the GPA some 400 pounds (180 kg) lighter than its competitor. The GPA's design was based on the Willys MB and Ford GPW standard Jeeps as much as possible, using many of the same parts. In 1944 the US Army issued a bulletin explaining how axles could be salvaged from unwanted GPAs and used to repair standard jeeps. The GPA had an interior similar to that of the MB/GPW jeeps, although the driver's compartment had almost twice as many control levers: 2WD/4WD, hi-range/lo-range, capstan winch (on the bows), propeller deployment and rudder control. After a direct comparison of the two companies' prototypes, Ford received a contract for production starting in 1942.

The GPA was powered by an in-line 4 cylinder engine with carburetor, that could produce about 60 hp (45 kW). It had 4 wheel drive with a 3-speed transmission and 2-speed transfer case. It had two live axles on a leaf suspension, with 4 wheel drum brakes. The engine also could power a prop and a bilge pump. It had a spray shield and windshield wiper.

== Service ==
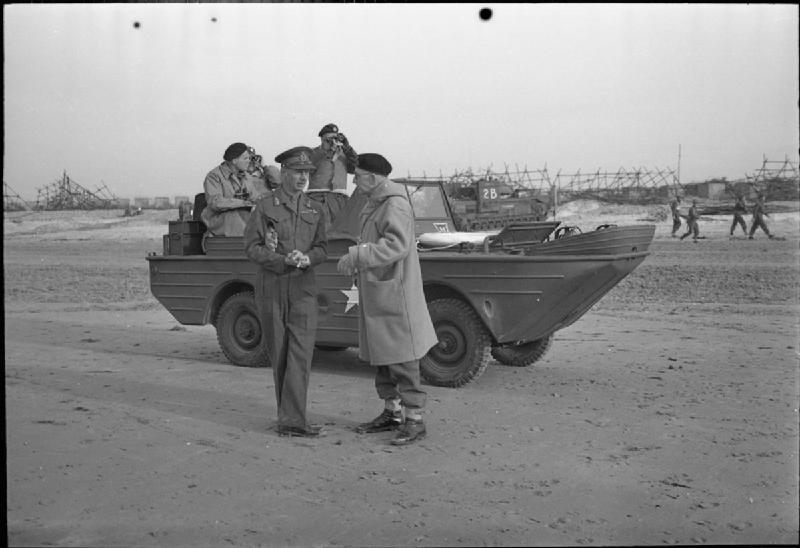
Lieutenant-General Miles Dempsey (left) and Major-General Percy Hobart stand by a Ford GPA during D-Day exercises in the United Kingdom, 1 May 1944.

In contrast to the DUKW, the GPA did not perform well in the field. At some 3,500 pounds (1,600 kg) the production truck had become much heavier than the original 2,600 pounds (1,200 kg) specified in the design brief, but its volume had not been increased accordingly. As a consequence, a low freeboard in the water meant that the GPA could not handle more than a light chop or carry much cargo. The GPA's intended use of ferrying troops and cargo from ships off-shore, over a beach and continuing inland, was therefore very limited.

On land, the vehicle was too heavy and its body too unwieldy to be popular with the soldiers. GPAs would frequently get stuck in shallow waters, where the regular Willys MB's water fording abilities allowed it to drive straight through. Production was already halted in March 1943 after production of only 12,778 vehicles due to financial quibbles between Ford and the US government, as well as bad reception of the vehicle in theatre. Some sources state that less than half of that number were ever completed, serial numbers of surviving specimens suggest that the figure of around 12,700 is actually correct.

GPAs participated in the Sicily landings of September 1943 after a small number were used in action earlier in North Africa. Some also saw service the Pacific theater. Under the Lend-Lease programme, some 4,486 GPAs were sent to US Allies. The largest recipients were the Soviet Union which received 3,520 and the British Commonwealth which received 852 GPAs.

== Postwar ==
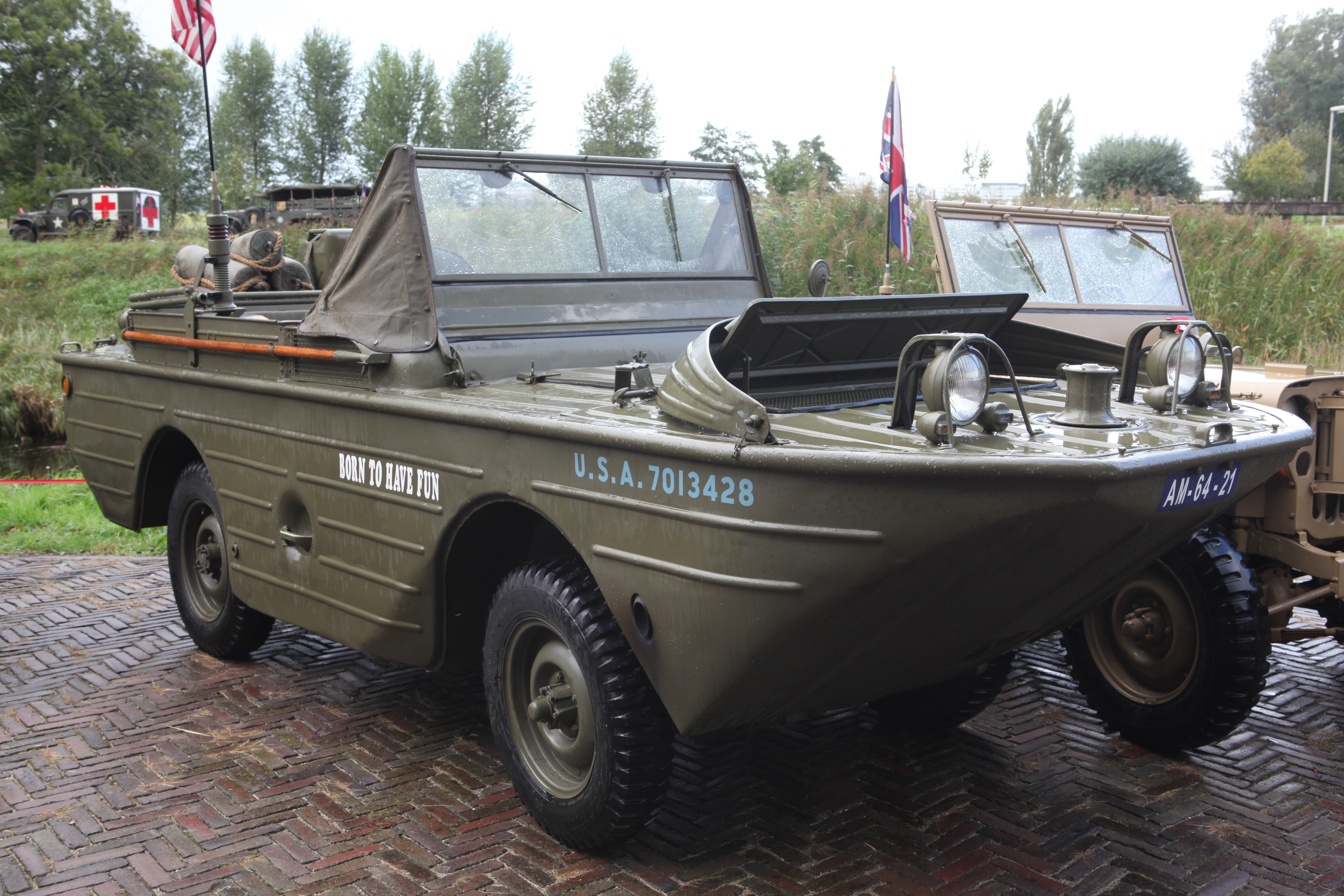
With splash guard folded back

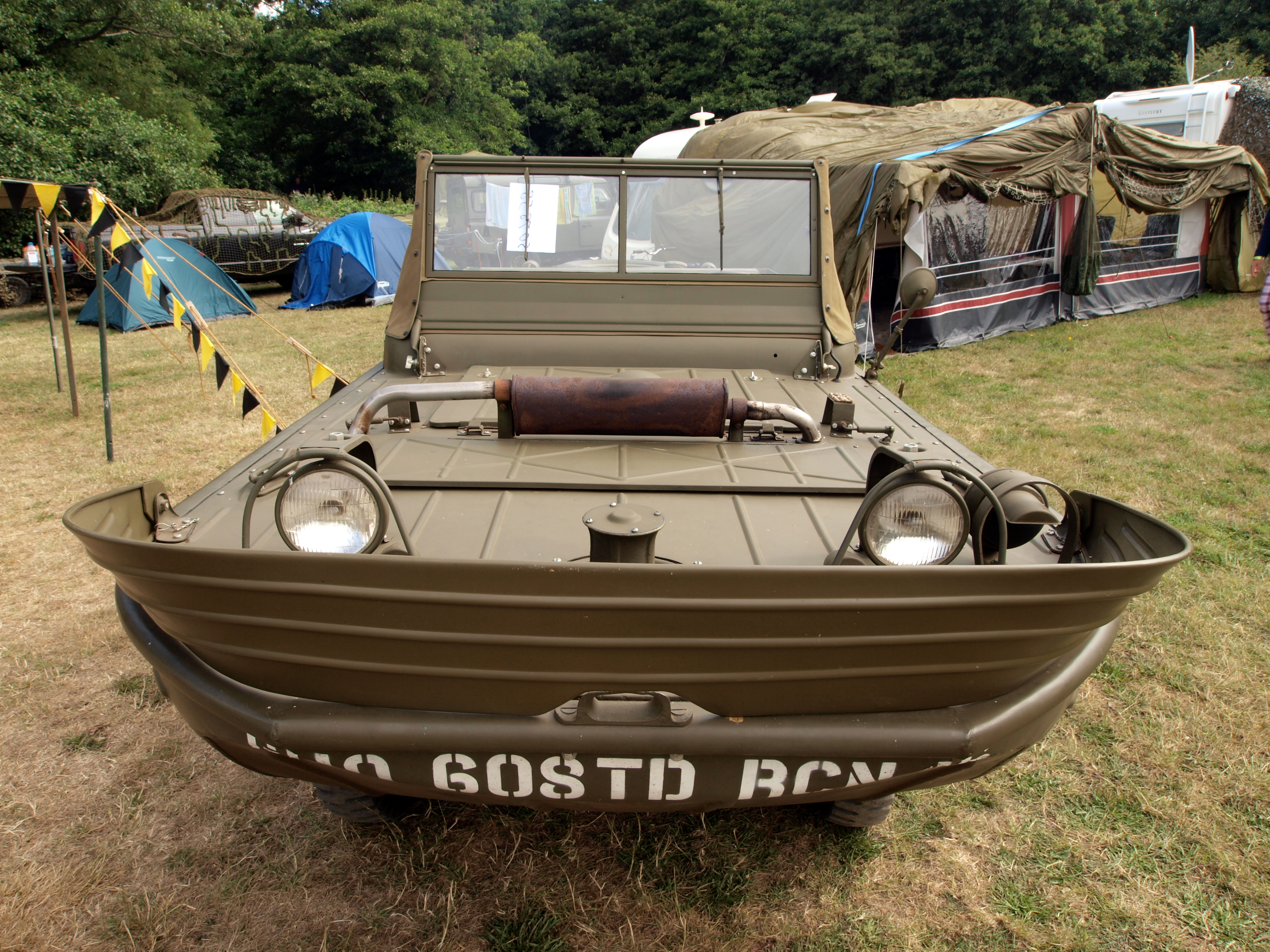
With splash guard in forward position

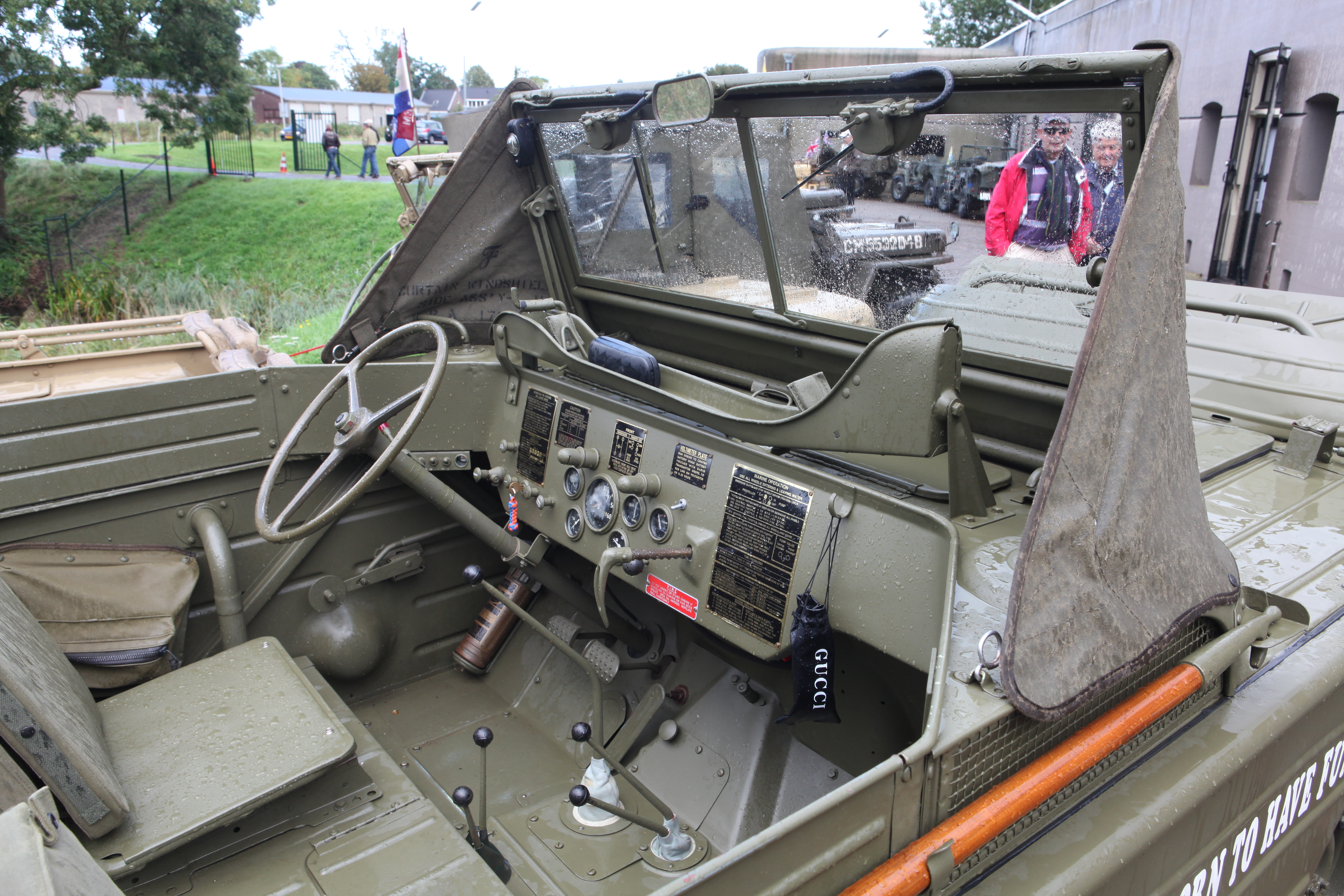
Interior of preserved GPA, 2010

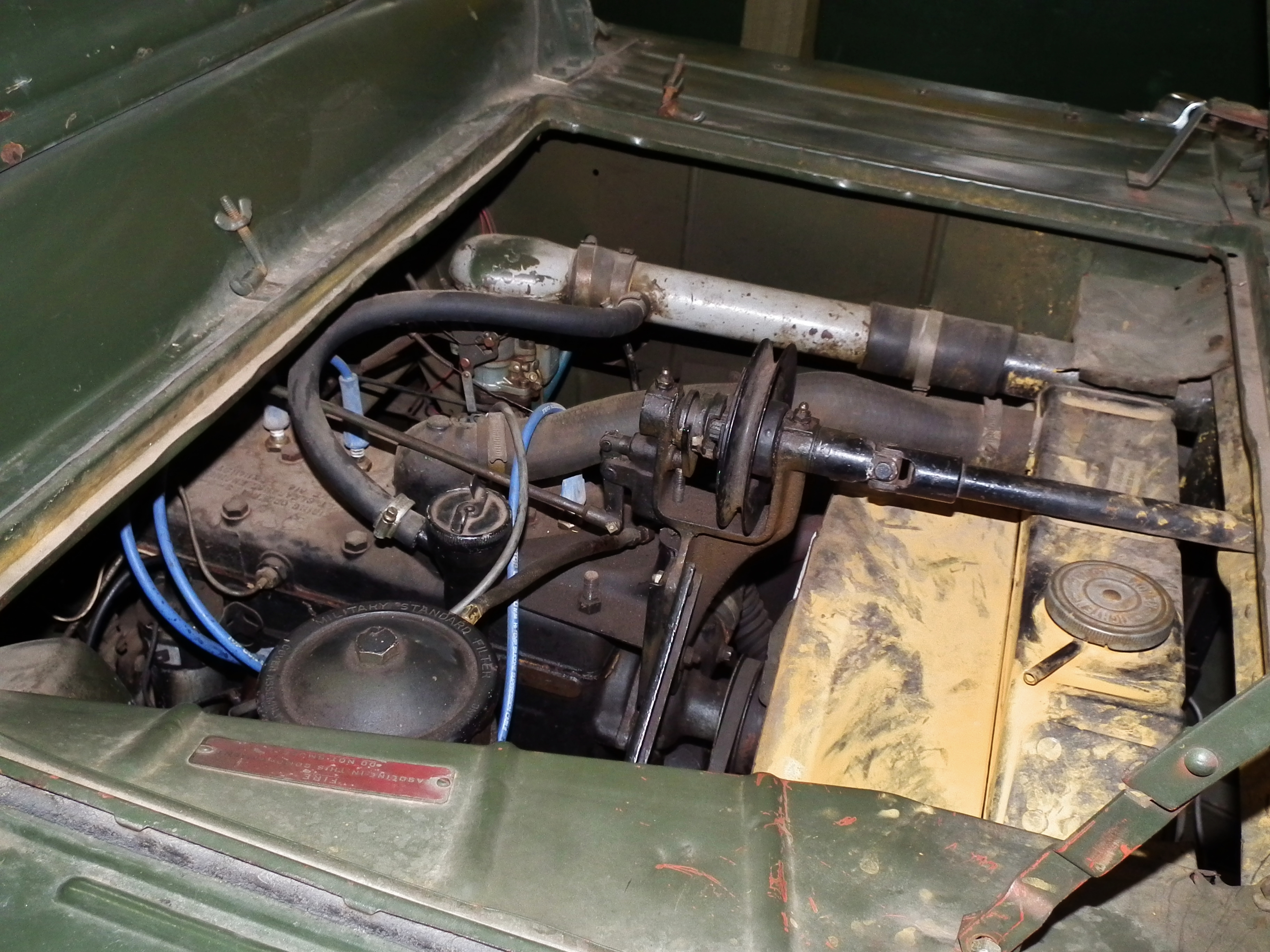
Engine compartment

The USSR developed a derivative of the GPA after the war. The GAZ-46 MAV, which closely resembled the GPA, entered production in 1952. The GAZ-46 was exported to many USSR-allied countries.

GPAs were also sold as surplus and were purchased by farmers, ranchers, adventurers, and others. By the 1970s, collectors had discovered them, and started restoring them back to their original specifications. They appear at various military vehicle shows.

The GPA was popular with adventurers, farmers, ranchers and by the 21st century about 200 of the 12,700+ produced had survived. The vehicle is popular with collectors, and well-preserved examples sold at auction for US$125,000 in 2016 (equivalent to $170,000 in 2025).

== Half-Safe and other conversions ==
After World War II, several adventurers converted surplus GPAs into world-travelling machines.

The most famous one was during the 1950s when Australian Ben Carlin (1912–1981) sailed and drove a modified Seep, that he called "Half-Safe" on a journey around the world. The Guinness World Records recognises Carlin as having completed the "first and only circumnavigation by an amphibious vehicle".

A young American couple, Helen and Frank Schreider, converted one which they called "La Tortuga" and traveled from Los Angeles to the Southern tip of South America (1954–1956). They later converted another one called "Tortuga II" which they used on National Geographic expeditions in India (1959) and Indonesia (1961).

World War II British paratrooper veteran Lionel Force purchased a GPA from Levy's Surplus in Toronto, Ontario, Canada, and called it "The Amphib". Among many changes, he grafted on a roof from a Dodge station wagon and lengthened the hull at the stern. He used the top halves of the doors, but knowing that he might be tied up alongside a dock, he added a round roof hatch. He planned to travel from Toronto to England via the US, Mexico, Guatemala, Panama, South America including Brazil, Africa, the Middle East, Greece and up to England. He got as far as Panama but turned back when he learned that the freighter upon which he intended to ship "The Amphib" from Brazil to Africa had been taken out of service.

== See also ==
- Volkswagen Schwimmwagen – German World War II – based on the Kübelwagen.
- FMC XR311
- G-numbers (G-504)
