= VW 276 Schlepperfahrzeug =

German tractor vehicle

The Volkswagen Type 276 Schlepperfahrzeug (tractor vehicle) was a derivative of the Type 82 Kübelwagen modified to enable it to tow a load, gun or a trailer.

The intention was to use them in units composed of two modified Schlepperfahrzeug; one towing a 7.5 cm Infanteriegeschütz 37 infantry support gun, the other an ammunition trailer laden with 16 three-round cases of AP shell, and seven men (drivers included). The Type 276 only appeared at the end of 1944 and never went into mass production. .

== Differences ==
Apart from having a standard Wehrmacht tow-hook fitted to the rear cross-body member, the Typ276 differed from the standard Typ82 on the following points:

On the first model, the rear suspension was strengthened, and the car had bigger tyres (BF 200C16) on 7.00C16 rims (with a smaller offset inwards: 13 mm. instead of 33 mm). These were the same tyres and rims fitted on the Typ 166 Schwimmwagen amphibious vehicle.

To improve traction which proved to be grossly inadequate when towing off-road, these Typ 276 were later fitted with different gears in the rear axle reduction boxes (14:29 = 1:2.07 instead of 15:21 = 1:1.4); this increased the ground clearance by 15 mm (0.59 in) at the rear, brought the top speed down from 80 km/h (50 mph) to 54 km/h (34 mph) at an engine speed of 3,300 rpm, and lowered the rated mileage to 6.35 L/100km (37 mpg) on the road.

To prevent over-revving, especially when driving without a gun or trailer, the engine was fitted with a governor on the generator shaft (as fitted on the Typ155 stationary engine).

With these modifications, the drawbar pull reached, on tarmac, 700 kp (6,900 N; 1,500 lb_{f}) when starting from a stand, and 500 kp (4,900 N; 1,100 lb_{f}) at a speed of 8 km/h (5 mph) and the Type 276 would create a drawbar pull of about 550–650 kp (5,400–6,400 N; 1,200–1,400 lb_{f}) at top speed.
