= GAZ-46 =

Soviet amphibious military vehicle

GAZ-46 MAV
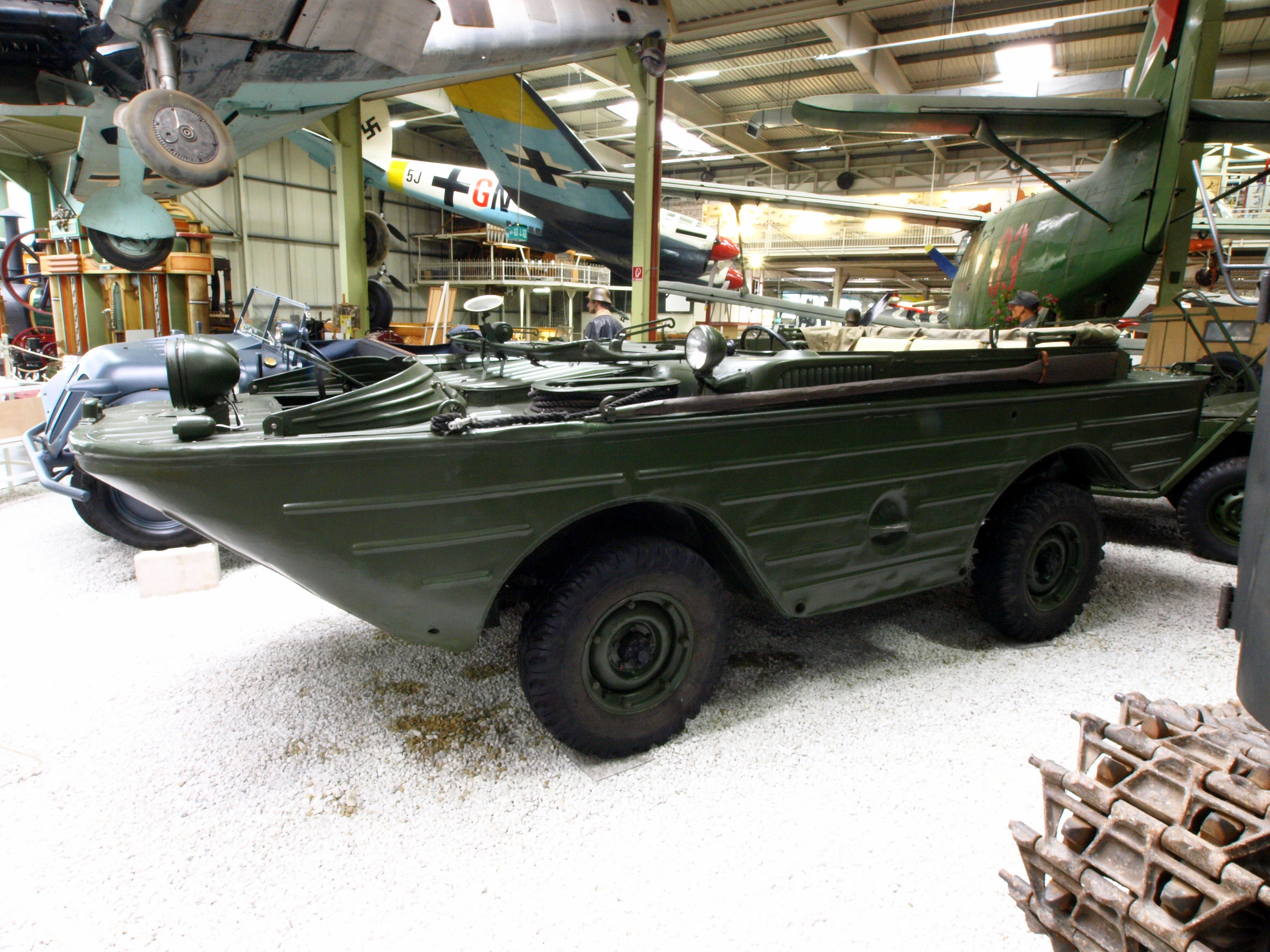
- A GAZ-46 at the Auto & Technik Museum Sinsheim, Germany (2009)

Overview
- Manufacturer: GAZ (Gorky Automobile Plant)
- Production: 1954-1958
- Assembly: Soviet Union

Body and chassis
- Class: 4×4 amphibious jeep
- Body style: waterproofed hull
- Layout: front engine, rear drive; part-time 4×4
- Platform: GAZ-69
- Related: Ford GPA

Powertrain
- Engine: 4 cyl petrol, 2112cc GAZ-69; 55 hp @ 2800 rpm, 170 nm @ 1400 rpm
- Transmission: 3-speed manual; 2-speed transfer case water: PTO propeller drive

Dimensions
- Wheelbase: 230 cm (91 inch)
- Length: 507 cm (200 inch)
- Width: 173,5 cm (68 inch)
- Height: 179 cm (70 inch)
- Curb weight: 1270 kg (GVW: 1770 kg)

The GAZ-46, army designation MAV (Russian, малый автомобиль водоплавающий, small floating car), is a Soviet-made light four-wheel drive amphibious military vehicle that entered service in the 1950s and has been used by many Eastern Bloc allied forces since.

== History ==
During the Second World War Canada, Britain and the United States forwarded large quantities of military materials to Russia. Among those were jeeps, trucks, and amphibious vehicles like the 6×6 DUKW and the 4×4 Ford GPA. The latter were used to help men and equipment get across the many rivers of Eastern Europe and combat the Germans. Seeing merits of such vehicles, after the war, Russia decided to develop two similar vehicles, using domestic automotive parts, the BAV, an equivalent of the DUKW, and the MAV, an equivalent of the Ford GPA.

Due to bad reception of the Ford GPA 'Seep' by Allied soldiers, most of them were routed to Russia under the US Lend-Lease program, before production was halted prematurely in 1943. The research institute NAMI developed a prototype NAMI-011, basing on GAZ-67B parts, in 1949. The authorities decided, that it should be manufactured in GAZ works, as GAZ-011, but the factory was reluctant, because a design needed much perfecting, while the GAZ-67B was obsolete and due to be replaced with GAZ-69.

As a result, an improved model GAZ-46 was built using the frame and parts of the GAZ-69 4×4 half-ton light truck, of which production started with the Gorky factory in 1952. The principal functions of the GAZ-46 MAV were to make light work of crossing lakes and rivers for men and materials, as well as performing river reconnaissance. As of the end of the fifties the latter role became reserved for the BRDM-1, a much more powerful 4×4 amphibious vehicle.

The GAZ-46 MAV used the mechanics of existing Russian GAZ 4×4 "jeeps" as well as being created somewhat bigger for better buoyancy, and its design is heavily inspired by that of the wartime Ford GPA. Just like the 'Seep', its hull is entirely out of steel, welded to a steel chassis. The layout is the same: engine compartment in the front, crew compartment in the center, and the spare wheel horizontally mounted on the rear deck. The driver and the commander of the vehicle have individual seats in the front with a three-seat bench behind them. The windshield can be folded down, and if necessary, a cover can be installed to close the cockpit. The engine is coupled to a manual three-speed gearbox and a two-speed transfer-case. Also, there is a screw-propeller for in the water propulsion, driven by a power take-off, and a proper rudder provides good maneuverability. Front and rear suspension is in the form of leaf-sprung rigid live axles. Thanks to its steeply raked front and rear and four-wheel drive, the GAZ can manage reasonably steep river banks before swimming across.

== See also ==
- Volkswagen Schwimmwagen
