= Volkswagen Kübelwagen =

VW Type 82 "Kübelwagen"
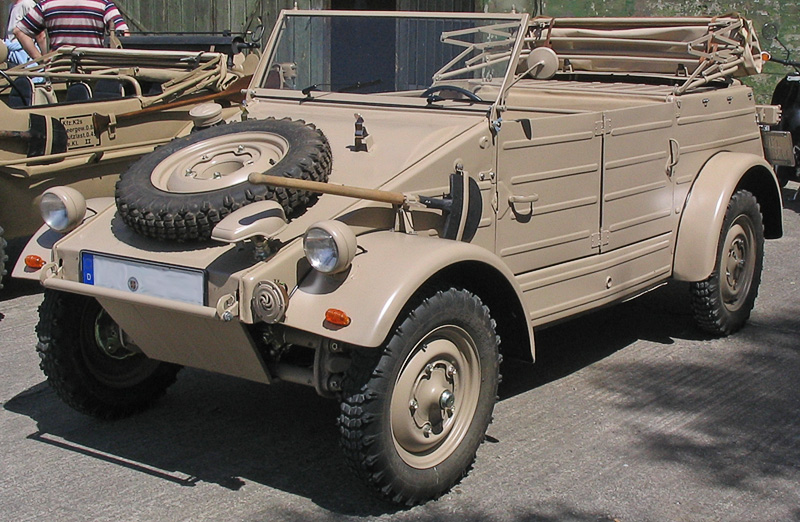

Overview
- Manufacturer: Volkswagenwerk GmbH
- Also called: Safari, 'Bucket/Tub car'
- Production: 1940–1945: ~53,000, comprising: 1940–1945: 50,435 for Wehrmacht and Waffen-SS; 1945: 2,490 for British Army
- Assembly: Stadt des KDF-Wagens, Germany
- Designer: Ferdinand Porsche

Body and chassis
- Class: Military vehicle
- Body style: 4-door utility roadster
- Layout: RR layout
- Platform: VW Type 1 Kdf-Wagen
- Related: VW 87 Kommandeurswagen; VW 166 Schwimmwagen; VW 276 Schlepperfahrzeug

Powertrain
- Engine: 985 cc (60.1 cu in) air-cooled H4; 1,131 cc (69.0 cu in) air-cooled H4
- Transmission: 4-speed manual; self-locking differential portal gear reduction by 1.4:1

Dimensions
- Wheelbase: 2,400 mm (94 in)
- Length: 3,740 mm (147 in)
- Width: 1,600 mm (63 in)
- Height: 1,650 mm (65 in) (top up); 1,110 mm (44 in) collapsible
- Curb weight: 725 kg (1,598 lb) empty GVW = 1,160 kg (2,560 lb)

Chronology
- Successor: DKW Munga (in German military); VW type 181 Thing / 182 Trekker

The Volkswagen Type 82 Kübelwagen, or simply Kübel, contractions of the original German word Kübelsitzwagen (translated: 'bucket-seat car' – but when the contractions are translated literally a back-formation of 'bucket' or 'tub'-car results), is a military light utility vehicle designed by Ferdinand Porsche and built by Volkswagen during World War II for use by the Nazi German military (both Wehrmacht and Waffen-SS). Based heavily on the Volkswagen Beetle, it was prototyped and first deployed in Poland as the Type 62, but following improvements entered full-scale production as the Type 82. Several derivative models, such as the Kommandeurswagen, were also built in dozens to hundreds.

The four-wheel drivetrain that was prototyped in the rejected Type 86 version went into mass production in the Schwimmwagen. The Type 86 performed better in comparative testing, but the additional costs of the more complex four-wheel drivetrain (both financial, as well as making the light car heavier and thirstier) did not outweigh the benefits from the German viewpoint. The Kübelwagen was intended to be able to be manhandled by its crew if they got stuck. Easily seating four men, the 725 kg (1,600 lb) empty weight Kübel was easier to lift than the 300 kg (660 lb) heavier jeep. The rear bench would seat three in a pinch, for a total of five inside.

Before the war, the term Kübelwagen became popular in Germany for light open-topped cross-country and military field cars without doors, because these were typically equipped with bucket seats to help keep occupants on board, necessary in an era before the adoption of seat belts. This body style had first been developed by Karosseriefabrik N. Trutz in 1923. The first Porsche Type 62 test vehicles had no doors and were therefore fitted with bucket seats as Kübelsitzwagen, later shortened to Kübelwagen. Despite later acquiring doors, and more regular, lower seats, the name Kübelwagen was retained. Besides the Volkswagen plant, Mercedes-Benz, Opel, and Tatra also built Kübel(sitz)wagen, though they were all rear-wheel drive models only.

The Kübelwagen's rolling chassis and mechanics were built at the Stadt des KdF-Wagens, ('city of the strength-through-joy-car', renamed Wolfsburg after 1945) and its body was built by US-owned firm Ambi Budd Presswerke in Berlin. The Kübelwagen's role as a light multi-purpose military vehicle made it the German equivalent to the Allied Willys MB jeep and the GAZ-67, after previous efforts to mass-produce standardized military four-wheel drives for the Wehrmacht had largely failed.

== History ==
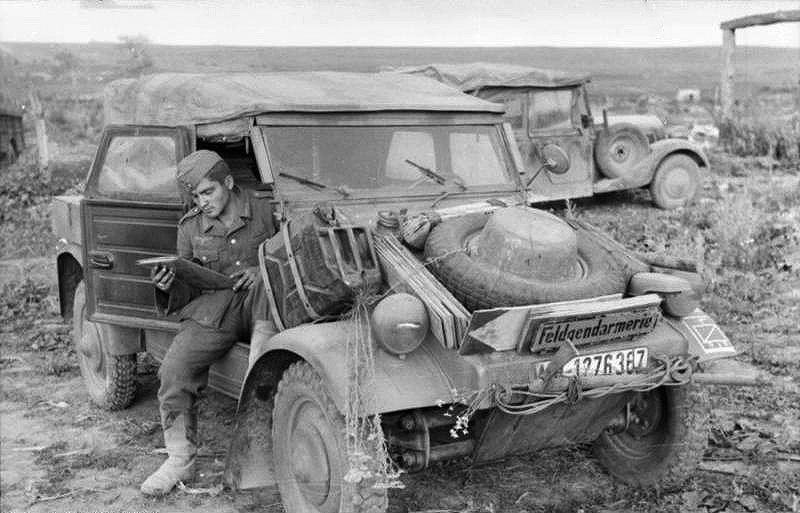
A Feldgendarmerie ('military police') Kübelwagen on the Eastern Front in 1943

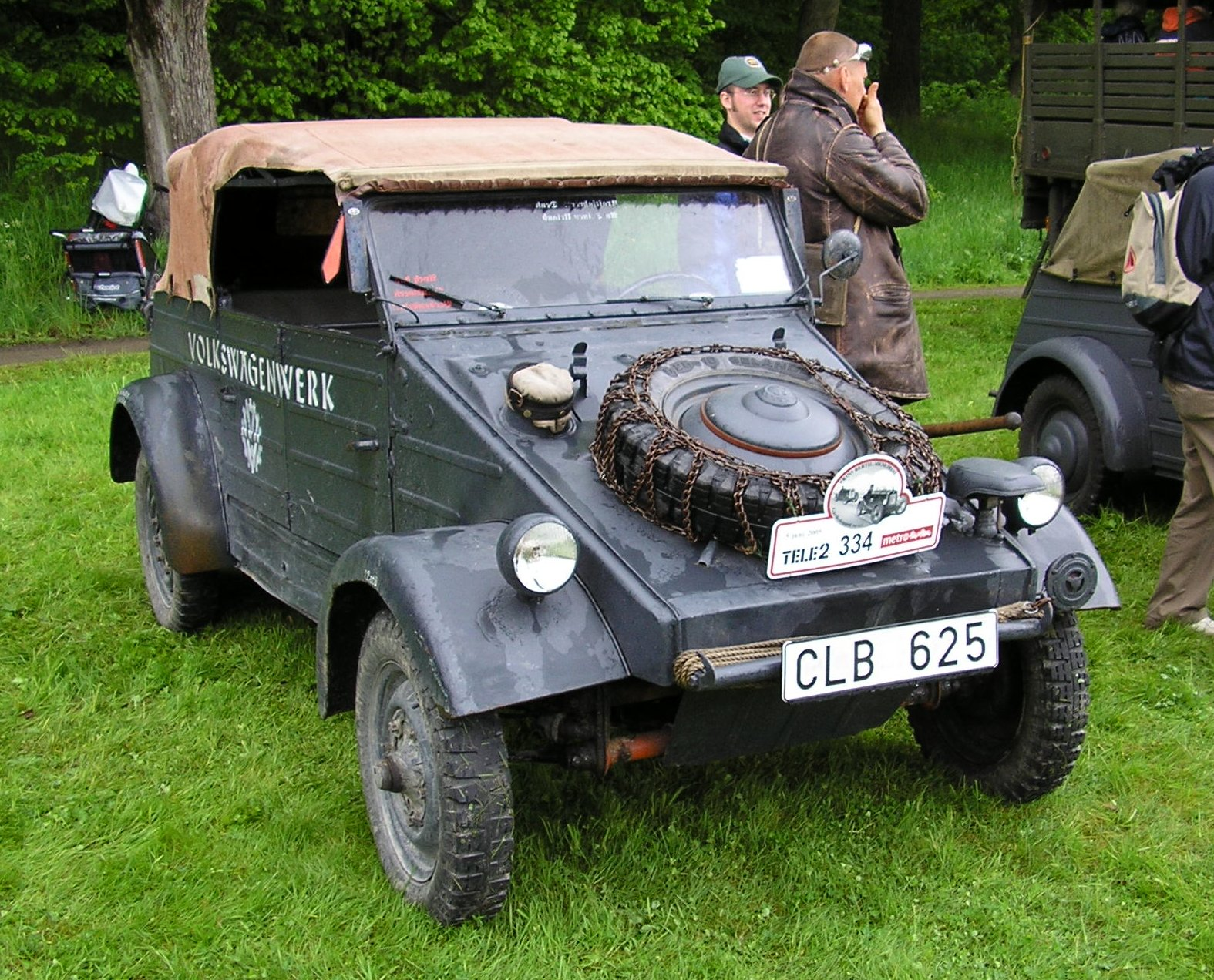
1951 Volkswagen Kübelwagen

Although Adolf Hitler had discussed the possibility of military application of the Volkswagen with Ferdinand Porsche as early as April 1934, it was not until January 1938 that high-ranking Heereswaffenamt officials formally approached Porsche about designing an inexpensive, lightweight military transport vehicle that could operate reliably both on- and off-road, in even the most extreme conditions.

Porsche began work on the project immediately, having a prototype of the vehicle ready within the month, but realized during development that it would not be enough to just reinforce the Beetle's chassis to handle the stresses that military use would place on it. In order to guarantee adequate off-road performance of a two-wheel-drive vehicle with a 1,000 cc (61 cu in) FMCV 1 engine, it would have to be lightweight. In fact, the army had stipulated a gross weight of 950 kg (2,090 lb), including four battle-dressed troops, which meant that the vehicle itself should not weigh more than 550 kg (1,210 lb). Porsche therefore sub-contracted Trutz, an experienced military coachbuilder, to help out with the body design.

Developmental testing by the military began after a presentation of the prototypes designated as Type 62 in November 1938. Despite lacking four wheel drive, the vehicle proved very competent at maneuvering its way over rough terrain, even in a direct comparison with a contemporary standard German Army 4x4, and the project was given the green light for further development. The vehicle's light weight and ZF self-locking differential compensated for the lack of a four-wheel drive.

Further development of the Type 62 took place during 1939, including a more angular body design, and pre-production models were field-tested in the invasion of Poland that started in September that year. Despite their overall satisfaction with the vehicle's performance, military commanders demanded a few important changes: the lowest speed of the vehicle had to be reduced from 8 km/h (5.0 mph) to 4 km/h (2.5 mph) as an adjustment to the marching pace of soldiers. (Note: The German army was not fully mechanised and most troops moved on foot or by horse) Second, it needed some further improvement of its cross-country mobility. Porsche responded to both requests by mounting new axles with gear-reduction hubs, providing the car with more torque while at the same time increasing its ground clearance. Revised dampers, 41 cm (16 in) wheels, and a limited-slip differential, as well as countless small modifications completed the specification. In order to reflect the changes, the vehicle was renamed Type 82.

Full-scale production of the Type 82 Kübelwagen started in February 1940, as soon as the VW factories had become operational. No major changes took place before production ended in 1945, only small modifications were implemented, mostly eliminating unnecessary parts and reinforcing others which had proved unequal to the task. Prototype versions were assembled with four-wheel-drive (Type 86) and different engines, but none offered a significant increase in performance or capability over the existing Type 82, so these designs went nowhere. As of March 1943, the car received a revised dash and the bigger 1,131 cc (69.0 cu in) engine, developed for the Schwimmwagen, that produced more torque and power than the original 985 cc (60.1 cu in) unit. Power of the original, 1-litre (61 cu in) engine is 23.5 PS (17.3 kW; 23.2 hp), while the larger, 1.1-litre (67 cu in) unit offered 25 PS (18.4 kW; 24.7 hp).

When Volkswagen production ceased at the end of the war, 50,435 Kübelwagen vehicles had been produced, and the vehicle had proven to be surprisingly useful, reliable, and durable.

Wolfsburg lies in what was the British occupation zone (●), close to the border with what was the Soviet occupation zone (●). (Note: The quadripartite area shown within the Soviet occupation zone is Berlin.) The American (●) and French (●) occupation zones were in the south.

=== Post-war ===
Upon conquest of Germany by the Allies, the country was occupied in four zones: American, Soviet, British and French. The massive Volkswagen factory and the town built for its workers, Wolfsburg, fell into the British occupation zone. Major Ivan Hirst was put in charge of the factory and workers. He is largely credited, upon discovering that debris covering parts of the factory had been put there to disguise the fact that it was still operational and that much of the machinery had survived the bombing, with resuming production and reopening the factory. Hirst organized the clearance of bomb damage, and had the buildings repaired. He recommissioned machine tools, body presses and assembly jigs; he concerned himself with improving the quality of the civilian car, including starting a sales and service network and starting exports. Despite a damning report of Volkswagens by engineers from the British Rootes Group stating that: "the vehicle does not meet the fundamental technical requirement of a motorcar", the British Army thought differently. When a surviving wartime Volkswagen was demonstrated to the British Rhine Army Group headquarters, the British military ordered a batch of 20,000 similar vehicles. By the end of 1945, the factory had managed to put together 2,490 cars. Many of them were then bartered in exchange for materials to make more cars. Hirst turned production around to export civilian Volkswagens; the first export went to the Netherlands in 1947.

Long after the end of the war, VW resurrected the basic Kübelwagen design as the 1969 Type 181, developed for the German Federal Armed Forces and later also produced this model for the civilian market, which was known as Thing in the US, Trekker in the UK, and Safari in Mexico. Although similar in looks and design, almost no parts were interchangeable with the original Type 82.

Intermeccanica of Canada has been producing a Kübelwagen replica since 1995.

== Technology and performance ==
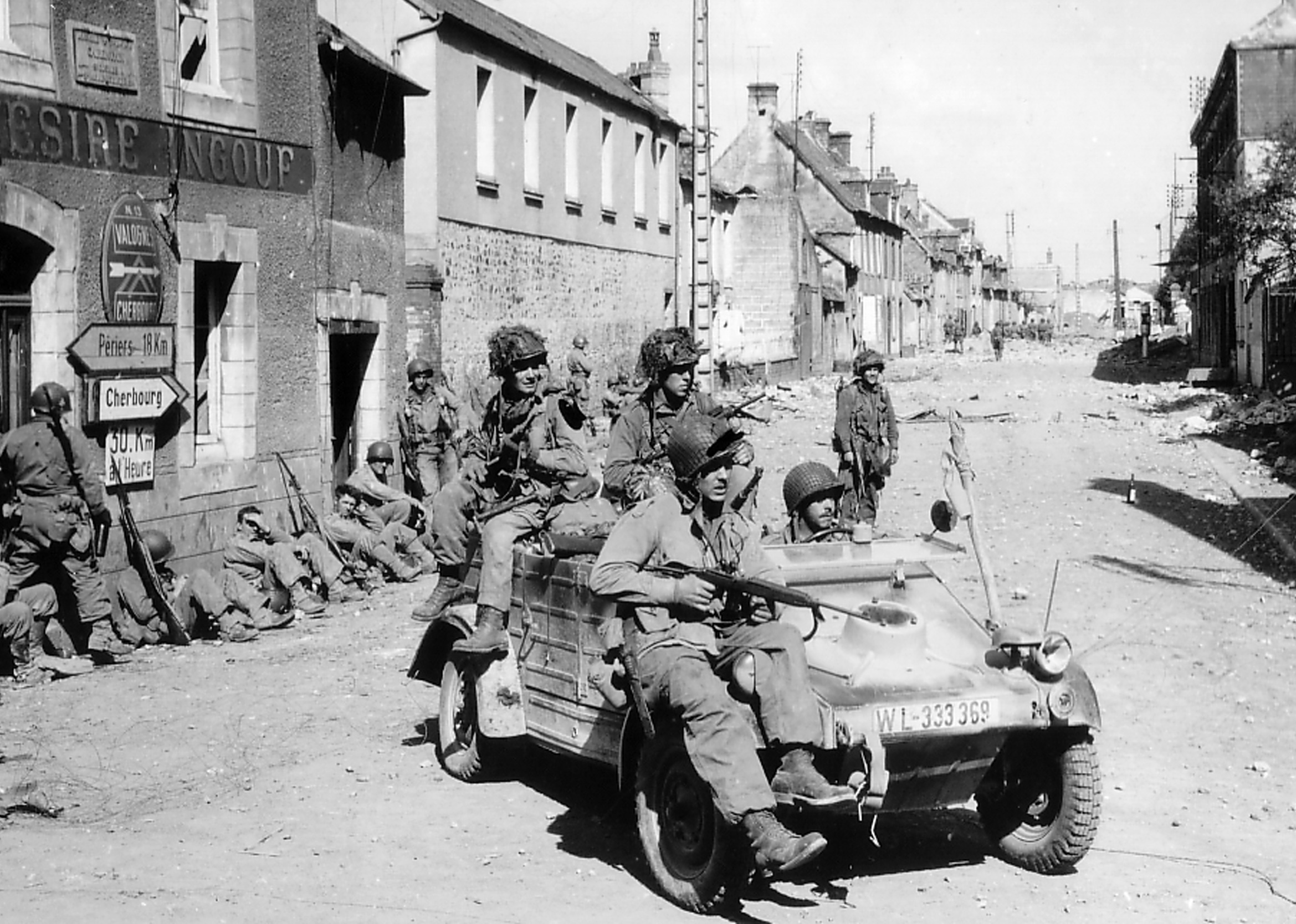
A Kübel seized by American paratroopers in Carentan during the Battle of Normandy, 1944

When the German military took delivery of the first vehicles, it immediately put them to the test on- and off-road in snow and ice to test their capability at handling European winters. Several four-wheel-drive vehicles were used as reference points. The two-wheel-drive Kübelwagen surprised even those who had been a part of its development, as it easily out-performed the other vehicles in nearly every test. Most notably, thanks to its smooth, flat underbody, the Kübel would propel itself much like a motorised sled when the wheels sank into sand, snow, or mud, allowing it to follow tracked vehicles with remarkable tenacity.

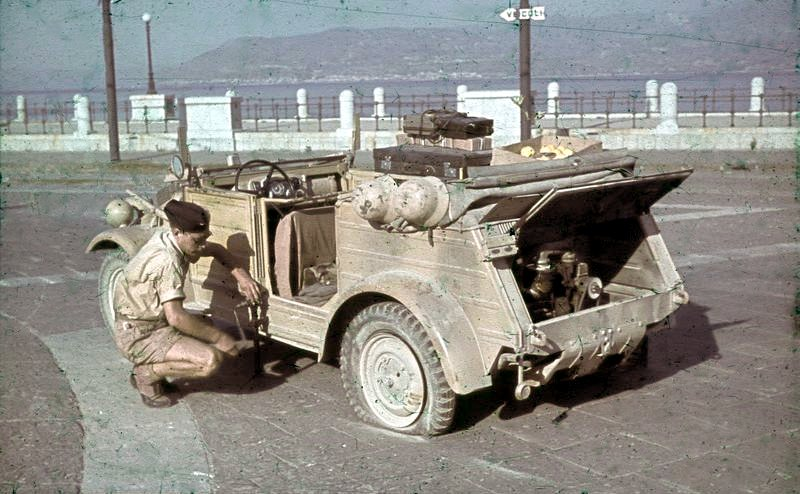
A soldier using a jack to change a Kübel's tire in Sicily, 1943

In November 1943, the US military conducted a series of tests as well on one or several Type 82s it had captured in the North Africa campaign. This evaluation, done at the Army's Aberdeen Proving Ground, resulted in the publication of War Department Technical Manual TM E9-803, 6 June 1944 (on D-Day). The manual's publication date (D-Day) is assumed to be coincidental, but its TM number was identical to that of the American jeep, with the prefix 'E' for 'enemy'. It was intended for distribution after the 6 June invasion of Normandy to US military personnel who might encounter ones that had been abandoned, possibly for lack of fuel or a minor technical problem, and with the help of this manual, might be put into service as additional vehicles. The TM calls the type 82 "a four-wheeled, rubbertyred, rear axle drive personnel carrier and reconnaissance car, comparable in purpose and size to the American 1/4-ton [230 kg] truck". So thorough was the analysis that it included information beyond what could be done as field servicing, plus ways of dealing with very low temperatures. A US War Department technical manual states: "The Volkswagen, the German equivalent of the American 'Jeep', is inferior in every way except in the comfort of its seating accommodations."

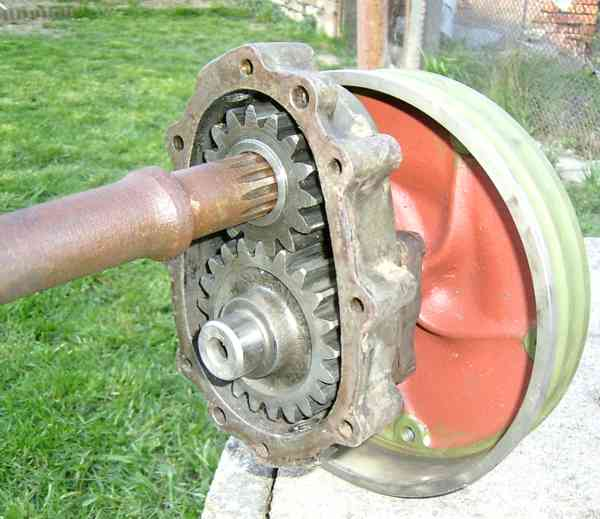
Two-gear reduction (15:21 teeth) portal hub of the VW Type 82 Kübel

At the same time, another Kübelwagen, also captured in North Africa, had been dissected in Britain by engineers of the Humber Car Company, whose report said it exhibited no "special brilliance" in design except in details and that "it is suggested that it is not to be regarded as an example of first class modern design to be copied by British industry".

Among the design features that contributed to the Kübelwagen's performance were:

- Light weight. While it was some 41 cm (16 in) longer than the Willys MB, it weighed more than 300 kg (660 lb) less.
- Very flat and smooth underbody that allowed the car to slide without snags over the surface it was traversing.
- Considerable ground clearance, roughly 28 cm (11 in), in part thanks to:
  - The use of portal gear hub reduction, providing more torque and ride height simultaneously.
  - Independent suspension on all four wheels.
  - Self-locking differential, limiting slippage and retaining traction.

In addition, the air-cooled engine proved highly tolerant of hot and cold climates alike, and was less vulnerable to bullets due to the absence of a radiator. For starting under winter conditions, a special, highly volatile starting fuel was supplied from a small auxiliary tank.

As the body was not a load-bearing part of the structure of the vehicle, it could easily be modified to special purposes, just like the jeep's.

The Kübelwagen, thanks to its geared hubs, could go as slow as marching troops 4 km/h (2.5 mph), yet reach a top speed of 80 km/h (50 mph).

== Variants ==
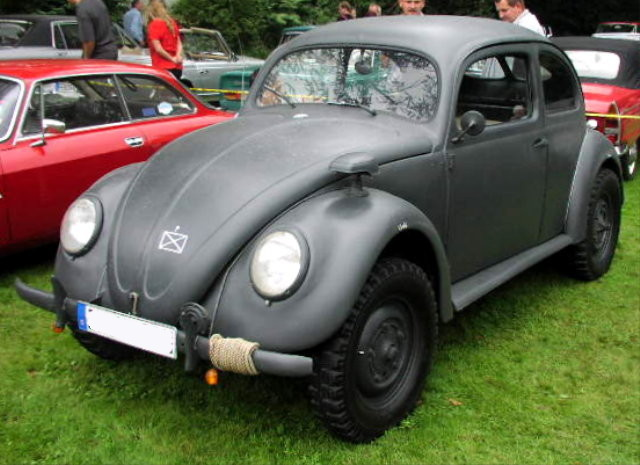
A VW Type 82E, a Kübelwagen chassis with a Beetle body

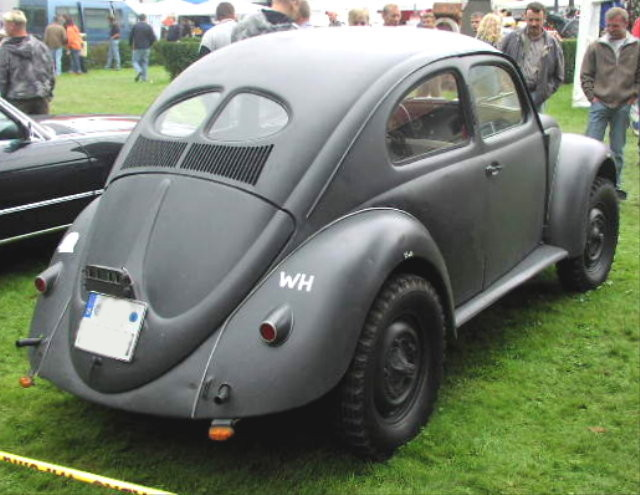
Rear of a VW Type 82E

The following body types and variants of the Type 82 were produced:

- Type 62: Prototype Kübelwagen, constructed from 15 May 1938; pre-production models (1939) field tested in the invasion of Poland
- Type 67: 2-stretcher ambulance; Type 60 Beetle chassis with modified Type 82 body
- Type 82/0: Basic, standard four seater
- Type 82/1: Three-seater; usually radio car
- Type 82/2: Sirencar (Siemens motor-driven siren mounted on passenger side in place of the rear seat)
- Type 82/3: Mock-up scout car / armoured vehicle, incl. gun-turret atop cabin – for decoy and training purposes
- Type 82/5: Kübelwagen chassis, with Type 60/LO (Note: LO for Lieferwagen offen ('open delivery van').) Pritschenwagen ('Beetle pickup-truck') body.
- Type 82/6: "Tropenwagen": Kübelwagen chassis, with Beetle panel-van / box-van body
- Type 82/7: Three-seat 'Command car': a Type 82 chassis, fitted with a Beetle body and roll-up canvas roof section. These three-seaters had a single rear seat behind the driver, and a co-driver's seat with fully reclining backrest for a commanding officer.
- Type 82/8: Like regular open Type 82/0 Kübelwagen, but with body made of wood, to save on scarce steel resources
- Type 82/E: (Note: From April 1943. Until then known as Type 92 (SS) for closed body, or 92/O(ffen) for convertible.) "Geländekäfer": Kübelwagen chassis with Beetle body (688 manufactured)
- Type 86: Four-wheel drive (six prototypes made)
- Type 87: "Kommandeurwagen": a Type 86 4WD Kübelwagen chassis with Beetle command car body. Fitted with running boards, under-hood-mounted spare tire (accompanied by a gas can, a jack, a small tool kit, and a shovel), and widened fenders for its larger-diameter Kronprinz (Crown Prince) off-road tires. Some were provided to high-ranking officers, who could push through virtually any kind of terrain with them. (667 produced)
- Type 89: Fitted with experimental automatic transmission
- Type 92/LO:deprecated — from April 1943 known as Type 82/5
- Type 92/O: "offen": Kübelwagen chassis, with Type 60/O (Beetle convertible) body
- Type 92/SS: (until April 1943): with interior attachments for fire-arms — from April 1943 deprecated, and known as Type 82/E
- Type 98: Beetle body with roll-up roof, on the Type 86 Kübelwagen 4×4 drive train
- Type 106: Fitted with an experimental transmission (assumed different from the Type 89)
- Type 107: Fitted with a turbocharger
- Type 115: Fitted with a supercharger
- Type 126: Fitted with a fully synchronized gearbox (assumed different from the Type 278)
- Type 155/1: Half-track / snow-track Kübelwagen prototype. Pictures of several track-set designs exist, although it is possible, that these were consecutively fitted to the same prototype. Trials proved, that the Type 155 was able to cover the most difficult terrain, but the modifications necessary to the standard Kübelwagen were extensive and the resulting vehicle was both very slow and forbiddingly inefficient.
- Type 157: Railway car equipment, used for Types 82 and 87
- Type 164: Six-wheeled, twin engine, dual-control prototype; never entered production
- Type 177: Fitted with a five-speed transmission (as opposed to the standard four-speed unit)
- Type 179: Fitted with fuel-injected Volkswagen engine
- Type 179-F: Later updated directly to the Schwimmwagen (mentioned above)—Could cross water and temporarily be used as a small boat and/or landing craft. Because of a thick and bulletproof skid plate, the engine was protected and all valves in the rear were airtight. The engine had a flush-activated 179 fuel injected engine, that would act as a drainer to push water out and prevent the engine from flooding.
- Type 198: Fitted with a PTO and auxiliary gearbox for starting the engines of armoured fighting vehicles
- Type 235: Fitted for power by an electric motor
- Type 239: Fitted for power by a wood-gas generator mounted on the nose (also listed as Type 230)
- Type 240: Fitted for power by bottled gas
- Type 276: "Schlepperfahrzeug": Type 82 fitted with a towing hook to pull a 3.7 cm 'PaK 36' gun
- Type 278: Fitted with synchronized gearbox
- Type 307: Fitted with a heavy-duty carburetor
- Type 309: Prototype fitted with a diesel engine
- Type 331: Prototype fitted for power by a "native fuel system" (acetylene gas) engine (also listed as Type 231)
- Type 332: Fitted for power by anthracite coal

== Gallery ==
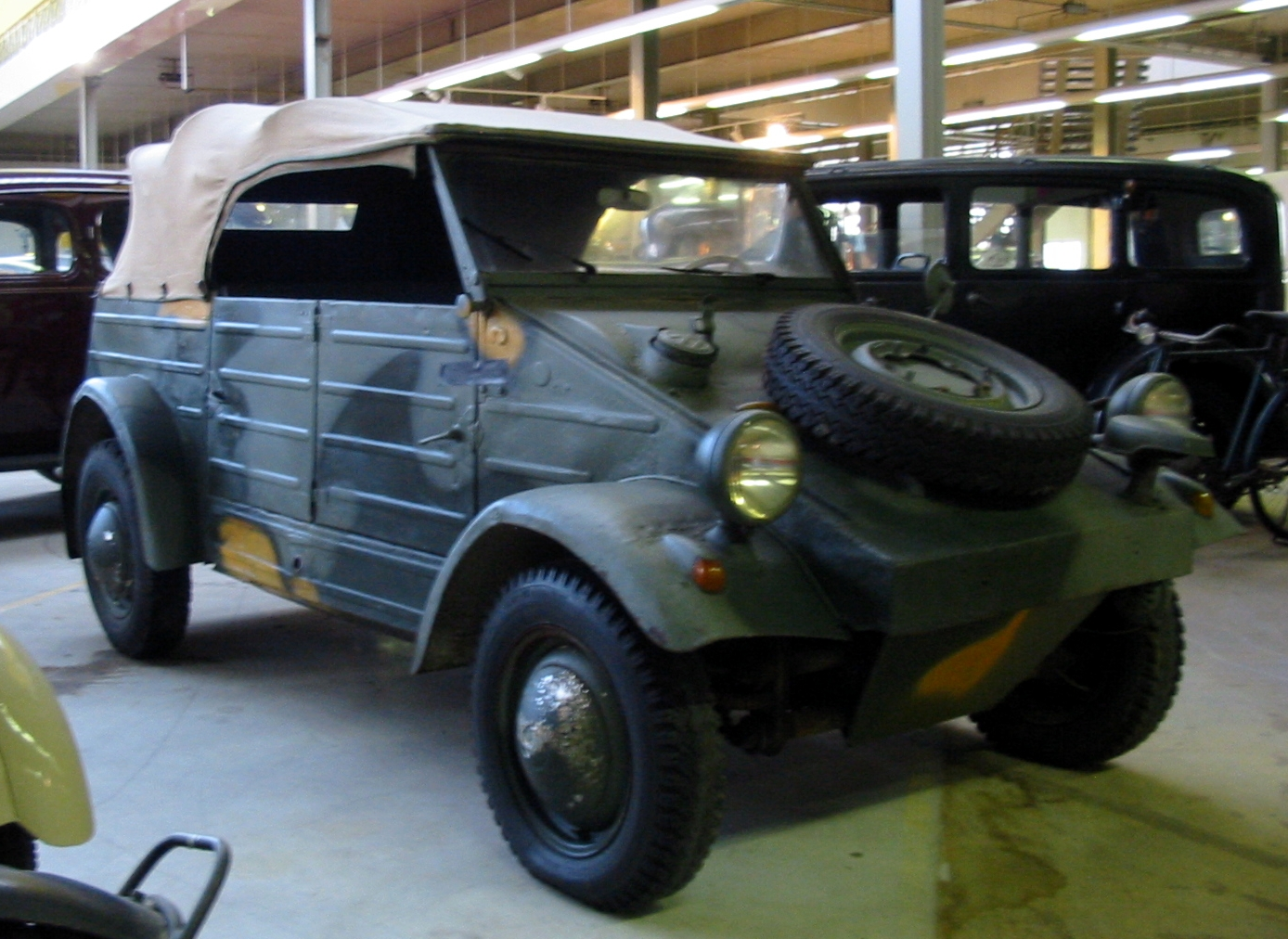
1943 Kübelwagen in grey camouflage

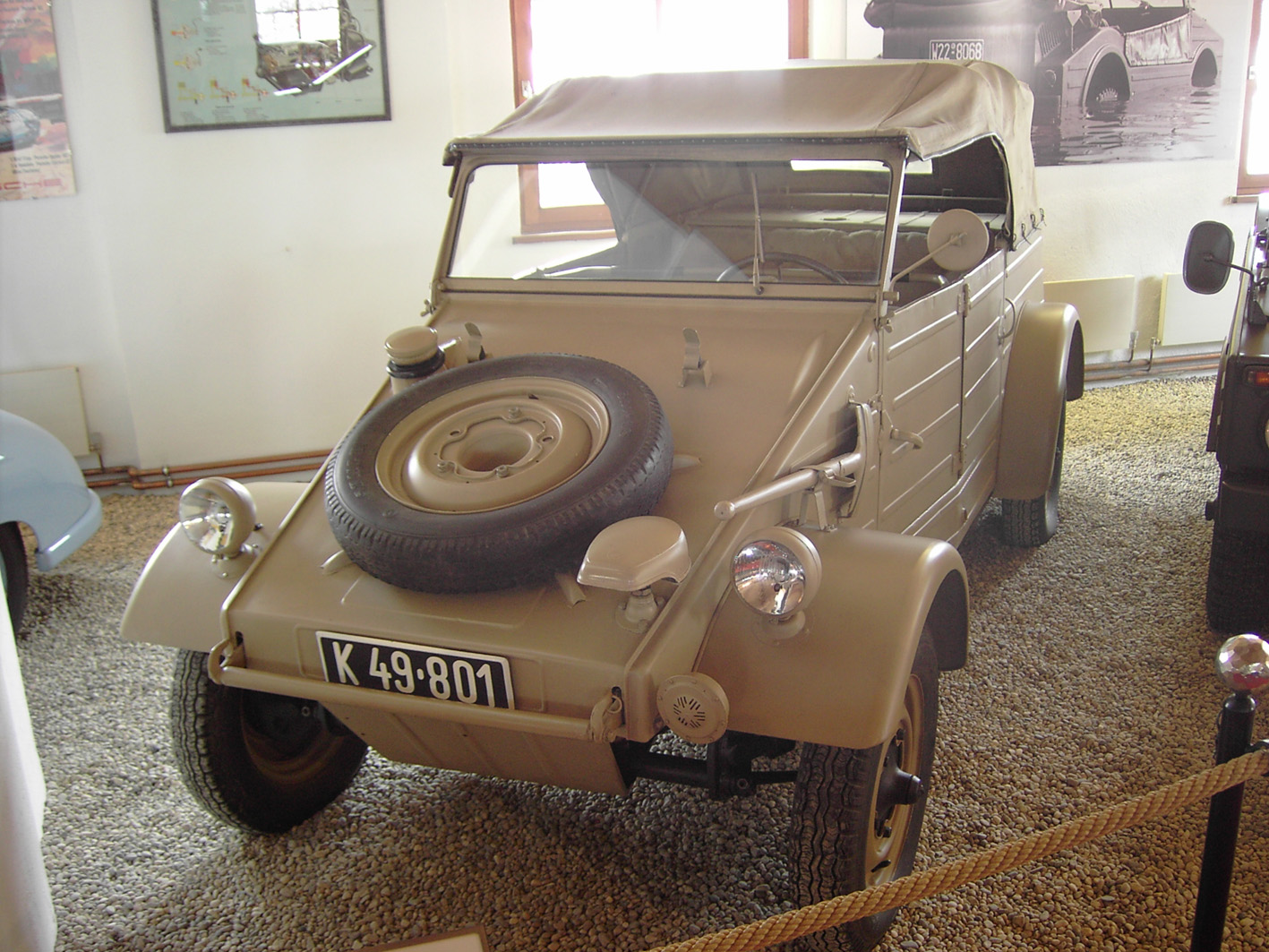
Type 82 on display at the Porsche museum Gmünd

Type 82 on display at the Texas Military Forces Museum

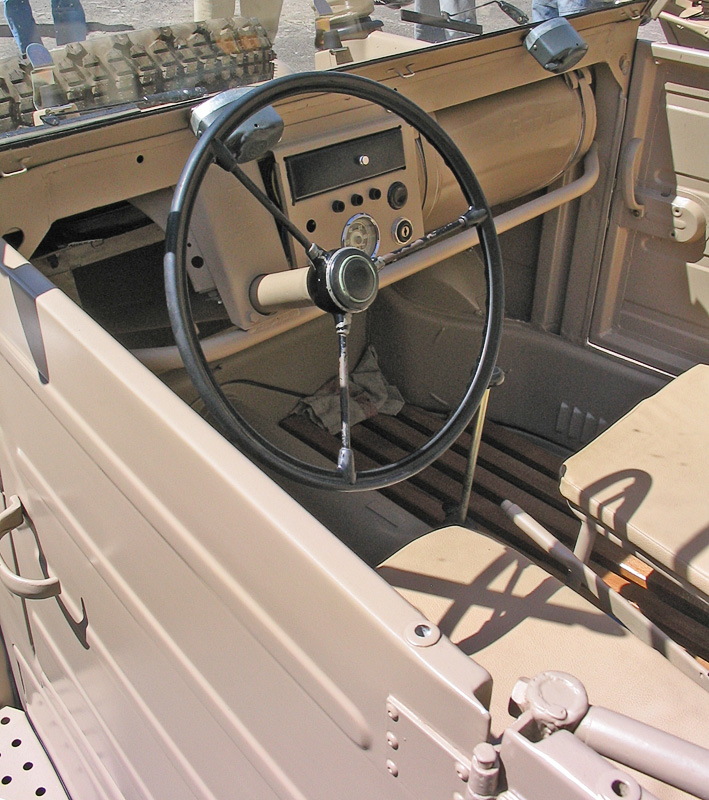
Interior detail

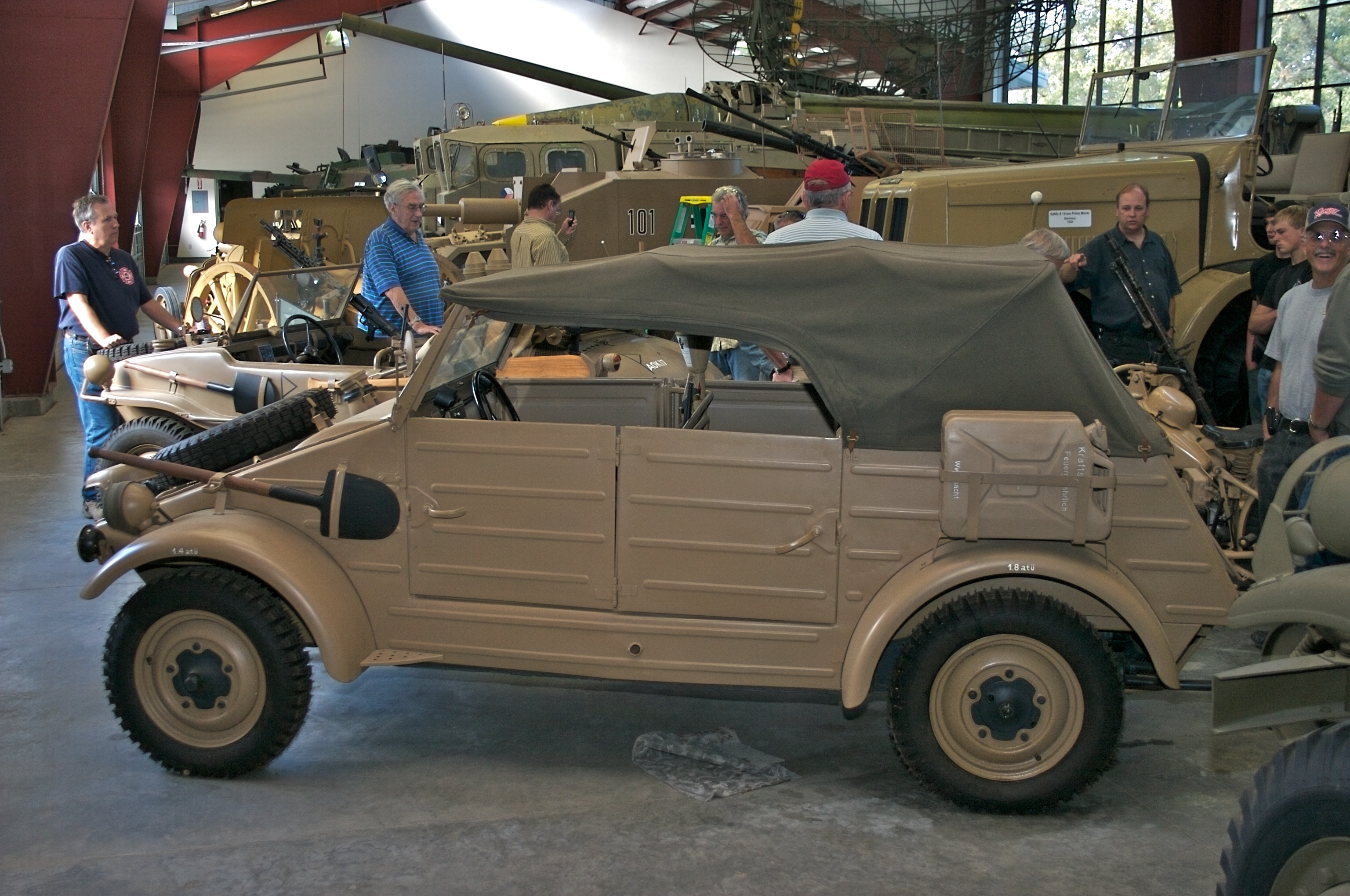
Side profile

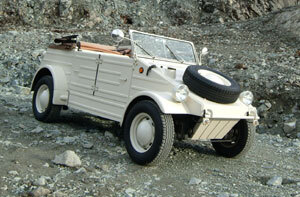
Type 82 replica built by Intermeccanica

== See also ==
- Einheits-PKW der Wehrmacht
- Military light utility vehicle
- Volkswagen Beetle
- Volkswagen Schwimmwagen
- Volkswagen 181
- FMC XR311
- Mercedes-Benz 170 VK
- Tatra 57K

== Sources ==
- Mayer-Stein, Hans-Georg (1993). Volkswagen Militärfahrzeuge 1938–1948 (PDF) (in German). Karl Müller Verlag. ISBN 3860708619.
