= Volkswagen Kommandeurswagen =

Volkswagen Typ 87
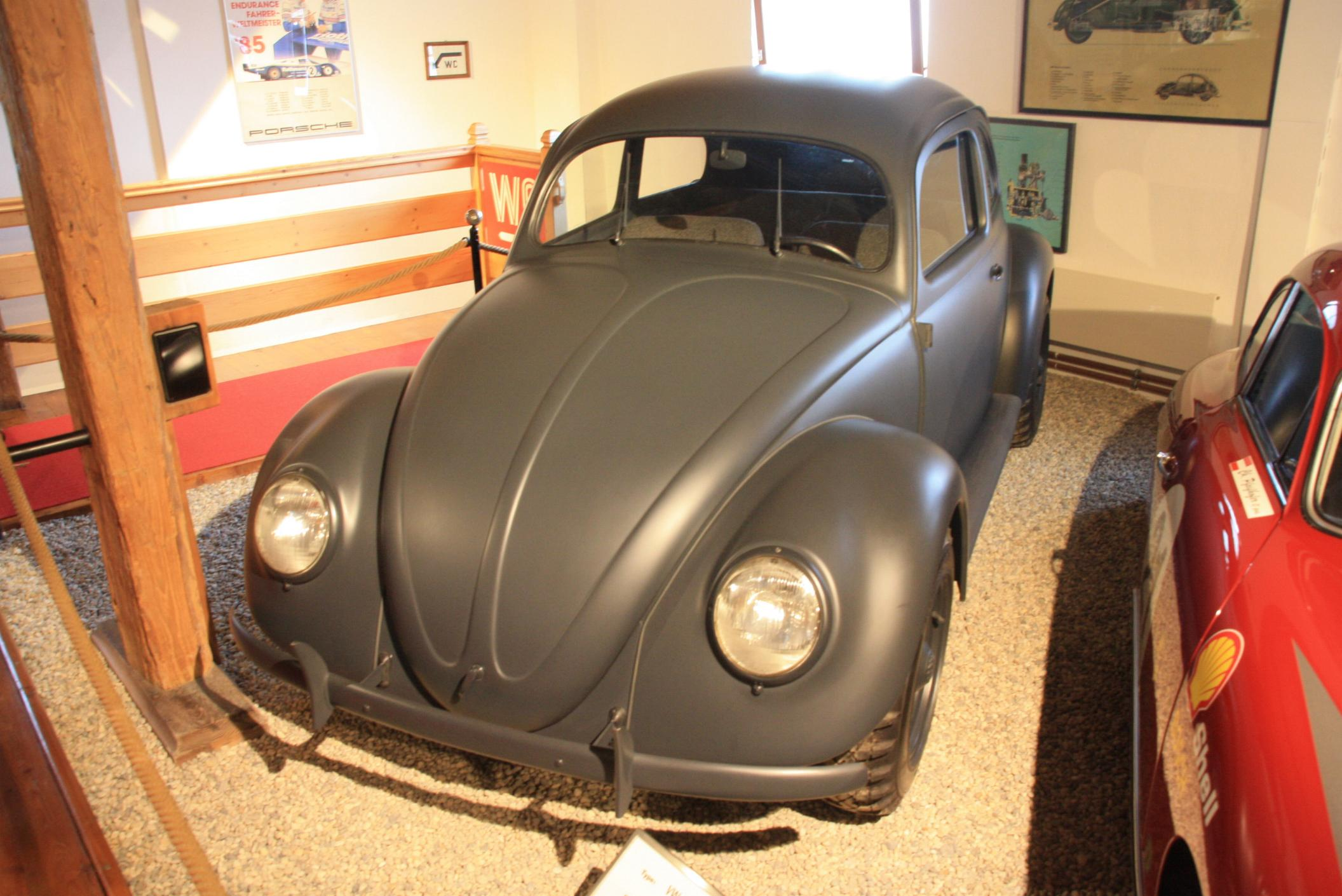
- VW Typ 87

Overview
- Manufacturer: Volkswagenwerk GmbH
- Also called: Kommandeurswagen
- Production: 1941–1944; 1946 (for UK army)
- Assembly: Germany: Stadt des KdF-Wagens
- Designer: Ferdinand Porsche

Body and chassis
- Class: Military vehicle
- Body style: 2-door saloon 2-door coupe utility
- Layout: Rear engine, four-wheel drive
- Platform: VW Typ 166 / KdF-Wagen
- Related: Volkswagen Typ 166 Schwimmwagen

Powertrain
- Engine: Volkswagen Type 1 petrol (1131 cc, 18 kW)
- Transmission: 4+1-speed manual

Dimensions
- Wheelbase: 2,400 mm (94.5 in)
- Length: 3,830 mm (12 ft 6.8 in)
- Width: 1,620 mm (5 ft 3.8 in)
- Height: 1,720 mm (5 ft 7.7 in)

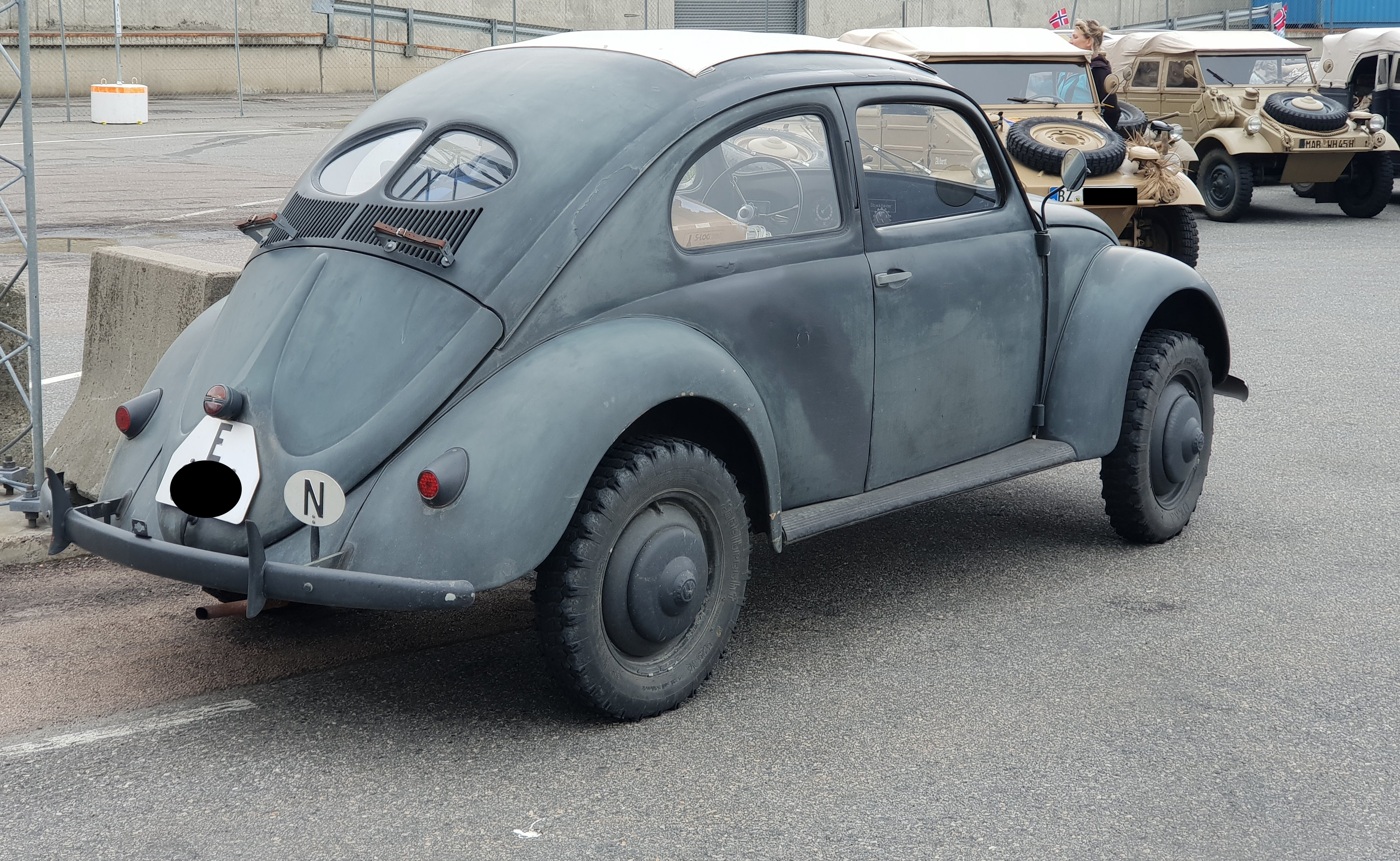
Kommandeurswagen in Oslo, Norway

The Volkswagen Typ 87, also known as the Kommandeurswagen, is a World War II, four-wheel-drive version of the Volkswagen Beetle. It was produced from 1941 to 1944 by the Volkswagen plant, primarily for high officers of the Wehrmacht (German armed forces). The Wehrmacht classified the Kommandeurswagen as leichter geländegängiger PKW, 4-sitziger, 4-radgetriebener Geländewagen Typ 87. ("light offroad passenger car, four seat, four-wheel drive offroad vehicle Type 87").

The engine and drive-train, including portal geared wheel hubs, are the same as in the Volkswagen Typ 166 Schwimmwagen amphibious vehicle. 564 units of the Kommandeurswagen were produced; in November 1946, the Volkswagen plant — by then under British control — produced two more vehicles using spare parts from stores.

== Description ==
The Typ 87 is a two-door offroad saloon. The visual appearance is similar to the KdF-Wagen, because the KdF-Wagen body was also used for the Typ 87. Due to the 5 1/4-16 offroad tyres, the wings had to be increased in width. The running boards were also made wider. While the boot of the KdF-Wagen holds a spare wheel in front of the fuel tank, the Typ 87 has an additional 20 L (4 1/2 imp gal; 5 1/2 US gal) fuel canister instead at the same place. The spare wheel is located on top of the 40 L (9 imp gal; 10 1/2 US gal) fuel tank, which has a modified filler neck. Chassis and body are connected with screws. By default, the Kommandeurswagen has a sunroof.

Like the VW Typ 166, the Typ 87 has a modified KdF-Wagen chassis. The backbone tube was increased in diameter to hold the additional drive shaft for the front wheels. A worm and sector steering was used, and the steering knuckles were modified to fit driveshafts for the front-wheel drive. The rear axle is equipped with reduction gears, both front and rear axle differentials are lockable. A single disc Fichtel & Sachs K10 dry clutch transmits the torque from the engine to the manual Porsche four-speed (plus reverse) gearbox, which is equipped with an additional offroad gear. The lever that engaged the offroad gear also engaged the front wheel drive. With four wheel drive engaged, the top speed is 10 km/h (6 mph) and the maximum slope climbing angle is 33.75°.

The Typ 87 is powered by an air-cooled flat four-cylinder 1,131 cc (69 cu in) four-stroke OHV petrol engine fed by a single Solex 26 VF3 carburettor. It is rated at 18 kW (24 PS; 24 hp).

Vehicles made for the German Afrika Korps were often equipped with tropical equipment which protected the air filter, the carburettor and the electrics from dust; in addition to that, they were fitted with Kronprinz sand tyres.

== Technical specifications ==
Specification
Engine
Engine type	Volkswagen air-cooled engine
Engine layout	Four-cylinder, flat engine (spark-ignition (Otto))
Cooling	Air-cooling with fan
Valvetrain	OHV
Fuel system	Carburettor Solex 26 VF3
Firing order	1-4-3-2
Bore × Stroke	75 mm × 64 mm (3.0 in × 2.5 in)
Displacement	1,131 cc
Rated power	18 kW (24 hp) at 3,000 rpm
Drivetrain
Clutch	Single disc dry clutch Fichtel & Sachs K10
Gearbox	Porsche 4-speed gearbox with additional offroad and reverse gear
Drive	Rear wheel drive with switchable front wheel drive and locking differentials
Chassis
Frame	Backbone tube chassis
Front springs	Torsion bar
Rear springs	Torsion bar
Steering	Worm and nut
Brake system	Drum brakes
Tyres	front and rear 5,25-16 or 200-16
Dimensions and weights
Dimensions (L × W × H)	3,830 mm (151 in) × 1,620 mm (64 in) × 1,720 mm (68 in)
Ground clearance	255 mm (10.0 in)
Wheelbase	2,400 mm (94 in)
Track width	front: 1,356 mm (53.4 in) rear: 1,360 mm (54 in)
Turning radius	5 m (16 ft)
Max. allowed weight	1,240 kg (2,734 lb)
Max. payload	450 kg (992 lb)
Additional data
Fuel consumption	8.5 L/100 km
Oil consumption	0.12 L/100 km
Fuel tank	40 L + 20 L canister
Top speed	80 km/h (50 mph)
Battery	Lead-acid, 6 V, 75 Ah
Starter	Bosch EED 0,4/6
Generator	Bosch REDK 130/6/2600

== Bibliography ==
- Hans-Georg Mayer: Der VW-Käfer im Kriege und im militärischen Einsatz danach. Band 114 aus der Reihe Waffen-Arsenal, Podzun-Pallas-Verlag, Dorheim 1988, ISBN 3-7909-0357-4. (in German)
