= Volkswagen Schwimmwagen =

Volkswagen Type 166 Schwimmwagen
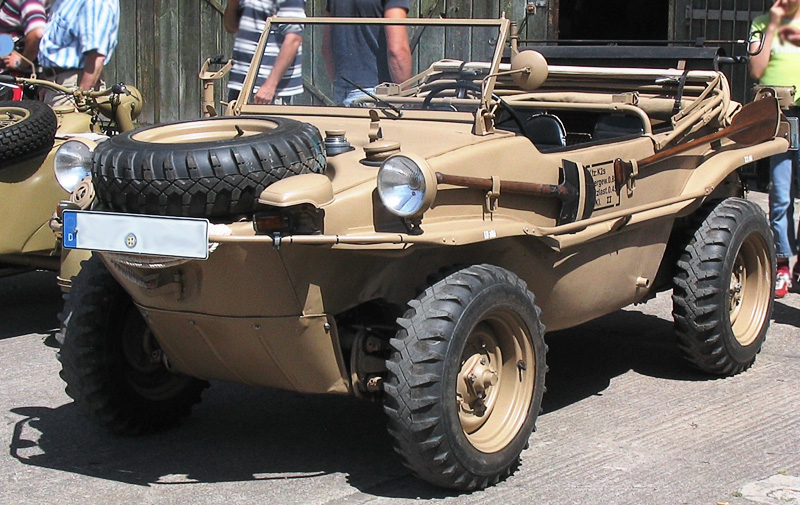
- Type: Amphibious military light utility vehicle
- Place of origin: Germany

Production history
- Manufacturer: Volkswagen
- Produced: 1942–1944
- No. built: 15,584 (14,276 at Fallersleben, 1,308 by Porsche in Stuttgart)

Specifications
- Mass: 910 kg (2,010 lb); 1,345 kg (2,965 lb) GVW
- Length: 3.825 m (12 ft 6.6 in)
- Width: 1.48 m (4 ft 10 in)
- Height: 1.615 m (5 ft 3.6 in)
- Engine: 4-cyl. boxer, air cooled 1,131 cc (69 cu in); 25 hp (19 kW) @ 3,000 rpm
- Transmission: 4-speed manual 2-speed transfer case; 4WD only on first gear or reverse

The Volkswagen Schwimmwagen ('swim car') is a light four-wheel drive amphibious car, used extensively by German ground forces during World War II. With over 15,000 units built, the Schwimmwagen is the most-produced amphibious car in history.

Prototyped as the Type 128, it entered full-scale production as the Type 166 in 1941, primarily for the Wehrmacht, and a small number for the Waffen-SS.

== Development ==
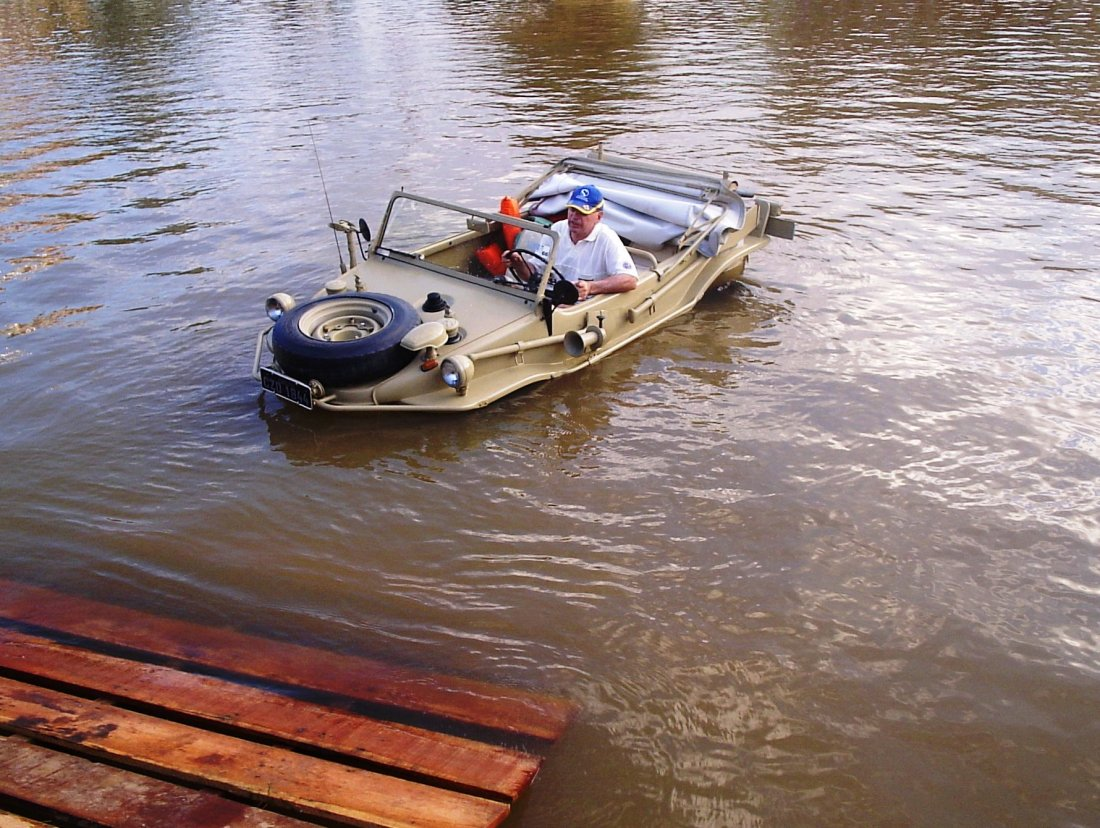
A Schwimmwagen demonstrated in 2004

The Schwimmwagen used the engine and mechanicals of the VW Type 86 four-wheel drive prototype of the Kübelwagen, also used for the Type 87 four-wheel drive 'Kübel/KDF' Command Car (Kommandeurswagen), which in turn were based on those of the civilian KDF-Wagen. Erwin Komenda, Ferdinand Porsche's first car-body designer, was forced to develop an all-new unitized bodytub structure, since the flat floorpan chassis of the existing VW vehicles was unsuited to smooth movement through water. Komenda patented his ideas for the swimming car at the German Patent office.

The initial Schwimmwagen, Type 128 prototype, was based on the full-length Kübelwagen wheelbase of 2.40 m (7 ft 10 in). Pre-production units of the 128, fitted with custom welded bodytubs, demonstrated that this construction was too weak for off-road use. It had insufficient torsional rigidity, and easily suffered hull-ruptures at the front cross-member, as well as in the wheel-wells. This was unacceptable for an amphibious vehicle. The large-scale production models (Type 166) had a reduced wheelbase of 2.00 m (6 ft 7 in) which resolved these issues.

Schwimmwagens were produced by the Volkswagen factory at Stadt des KdF-Wagens bei Fallersleben and Porsche's facilities in Stuttgart; with the bodies (or rather hulls) produced by Ambi Budd in Berlin. 15,584 Type 166 Schwimmwagen were produced from 1941 through 1944; 14,276 at Fallersleben and 1,308 by Porsche; the VW 166 is the most-produced amphibious car in history. The Schwimmwagen Registry lists 189 examples currently in existence of which 13 have survived without restoration work.

== Technology ==
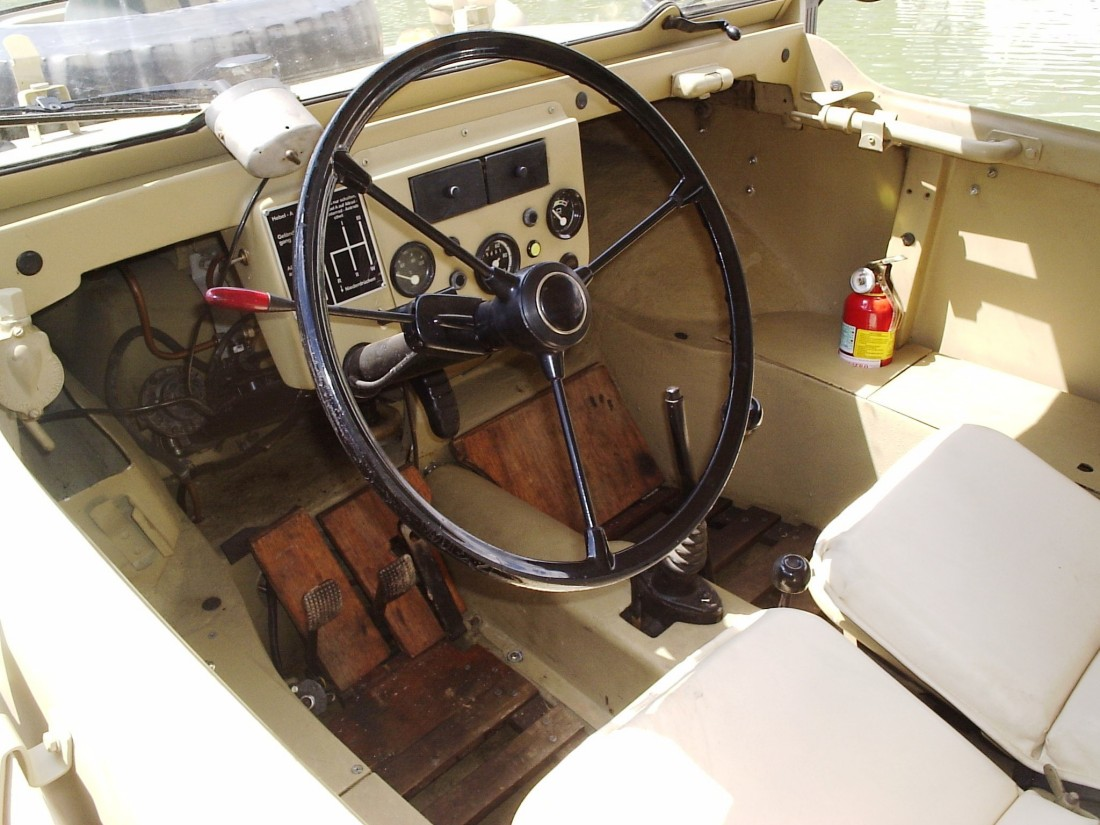
Spartan interior of the Schwimmwagen

All Schwimmwagens were four-wheel drive in first gear (and reverse gears on some models) only and had ZF self-locking differentials on the front and rear axles. As with the Kübelwagen, the Schwimmwagen had rear portal axles, which provided increased ground clearance, while at the same time reducing drive-line torque stresses with their gear reduction at the wheels. The Schwimmwagen had a top speed of 80 km/h (50 mph) on land.

When crossing a body of water a screw propeller could be lowered down from the rear deck/engine cover. When in place a simple coupling provided drive straight from an extension of the engine's crankshaft. This meant that screw propulsion always drove forward. The Schwimmwagen had a top speed of 10 km/h (6 mph) in the water. For reversing in the water there was the choice of using the standard equipment paddle or running the land drive in reverse, allowing the wheel-rotation to slowly take the vehicle back. The front wheels doubled up as rudders, so steering was done with the steering wheel both on land and on water. The Schwimmwagen could also be steered by the passengers using the paddle(s).

== Gallery ==
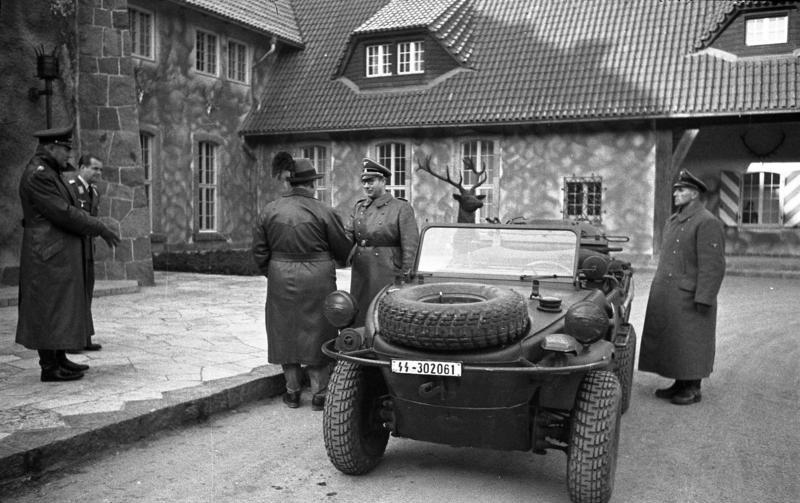
Hermann Göring with a Schwimmwagen at Carinhall

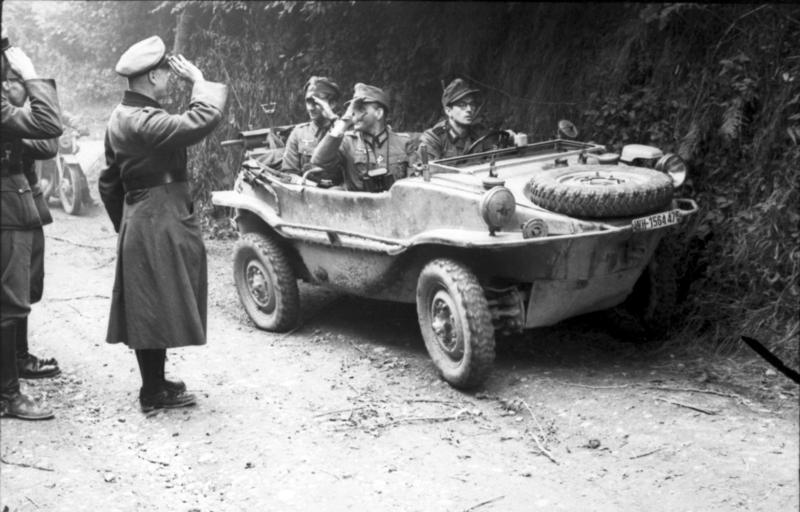
German officers in a Schwimmwagen in France in 1944

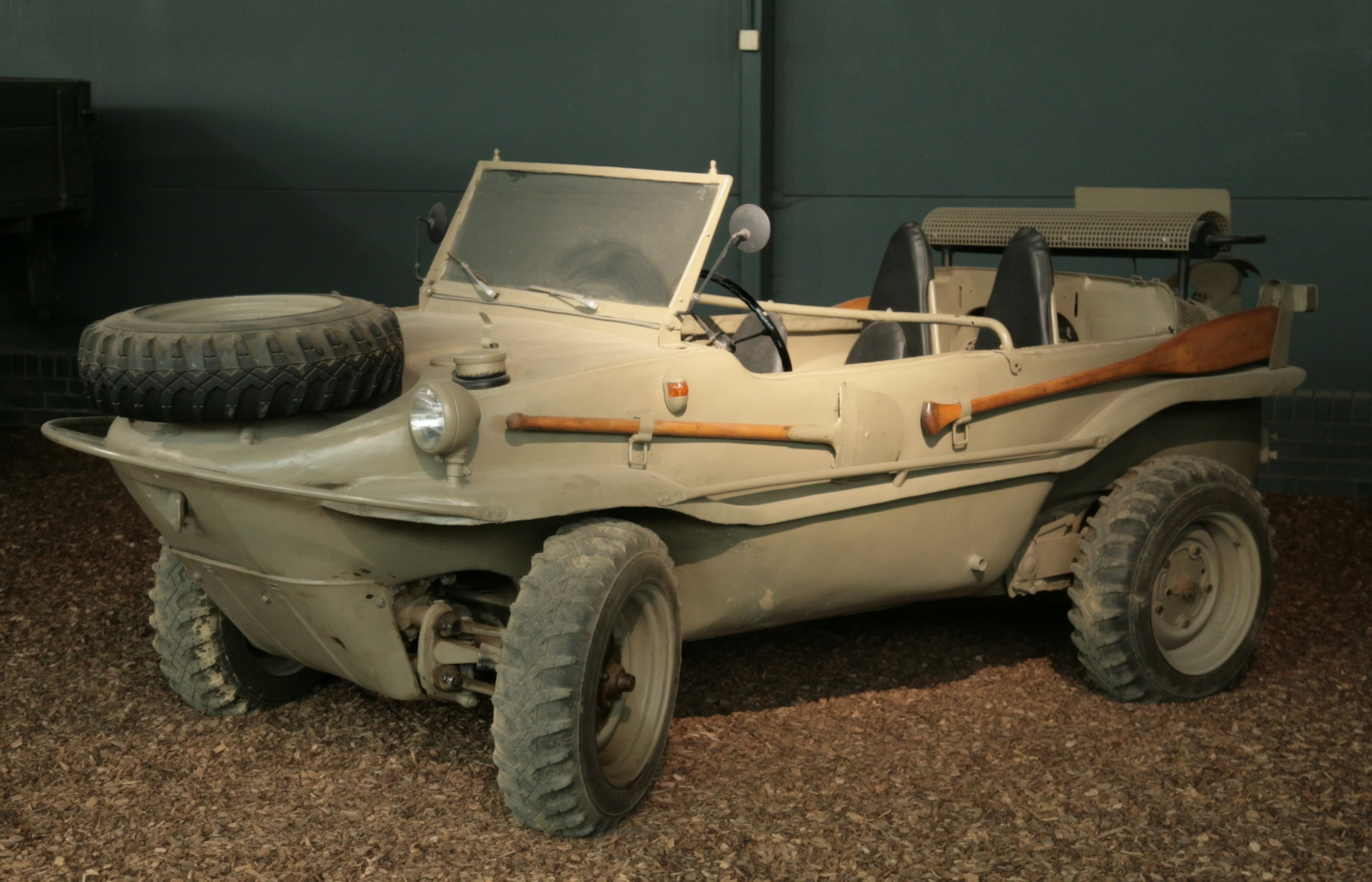
Schwimmwagen at the Imperial War Museum Duxford

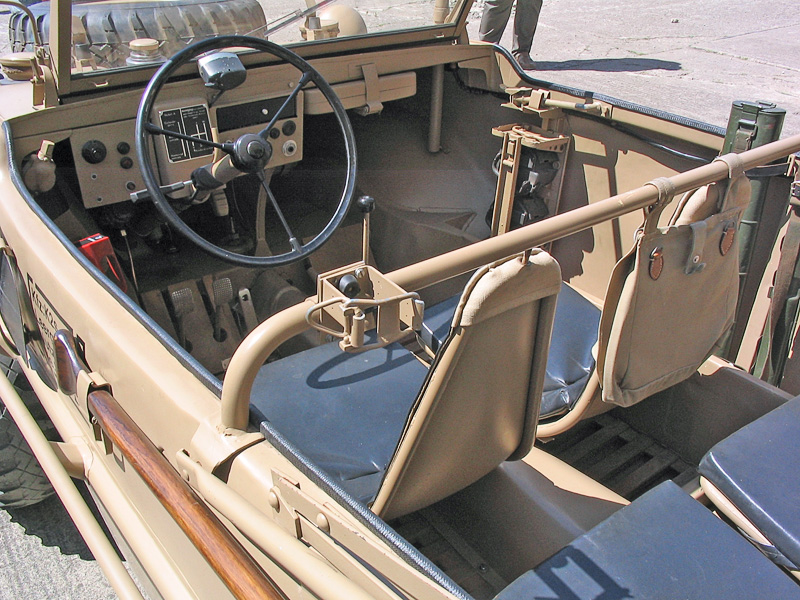
Schwimmwagen interior

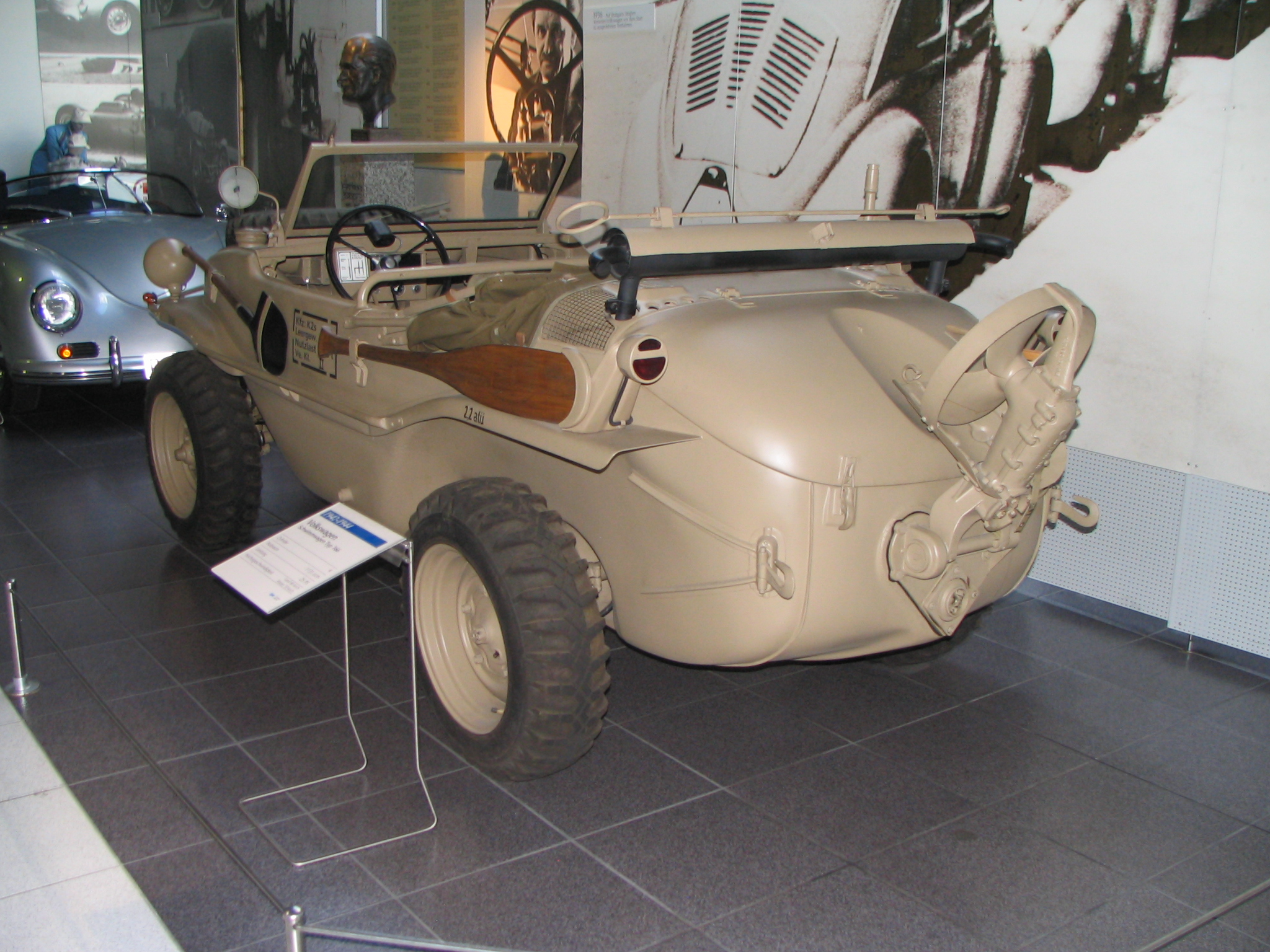
Type 166 Schwimmwagen

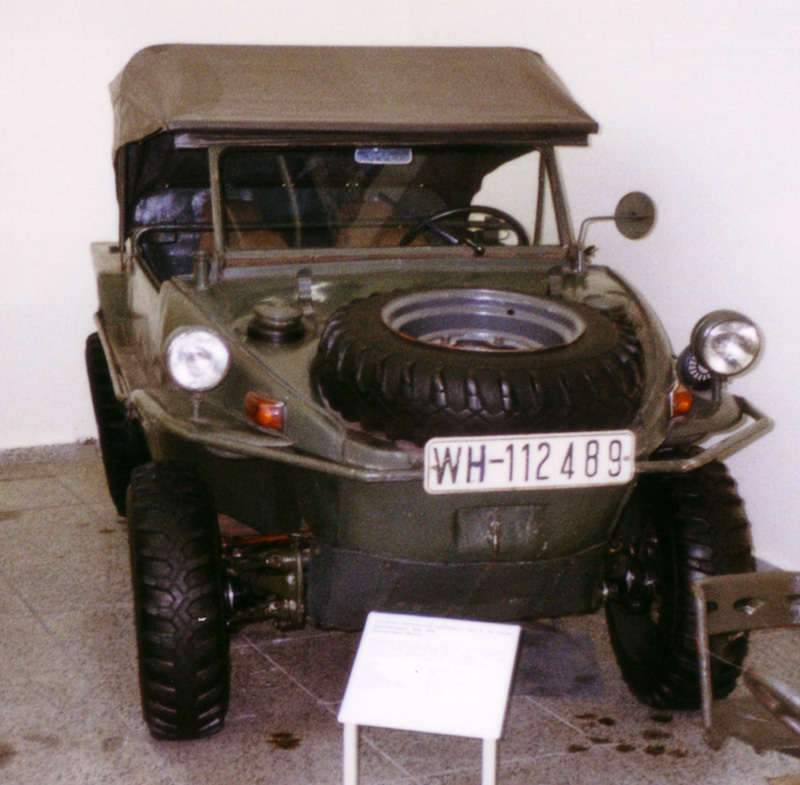
Schwimmwagen at the Army Museum Dresden

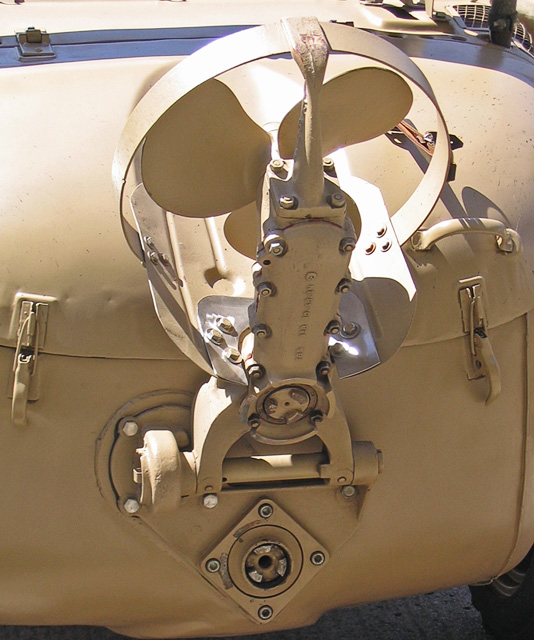
Detail of Schwimmwagen propeller

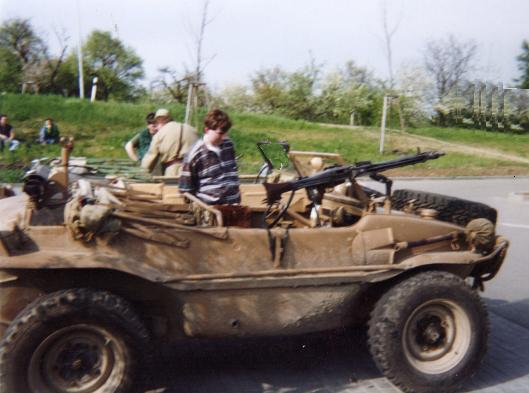
Schwimmwagen

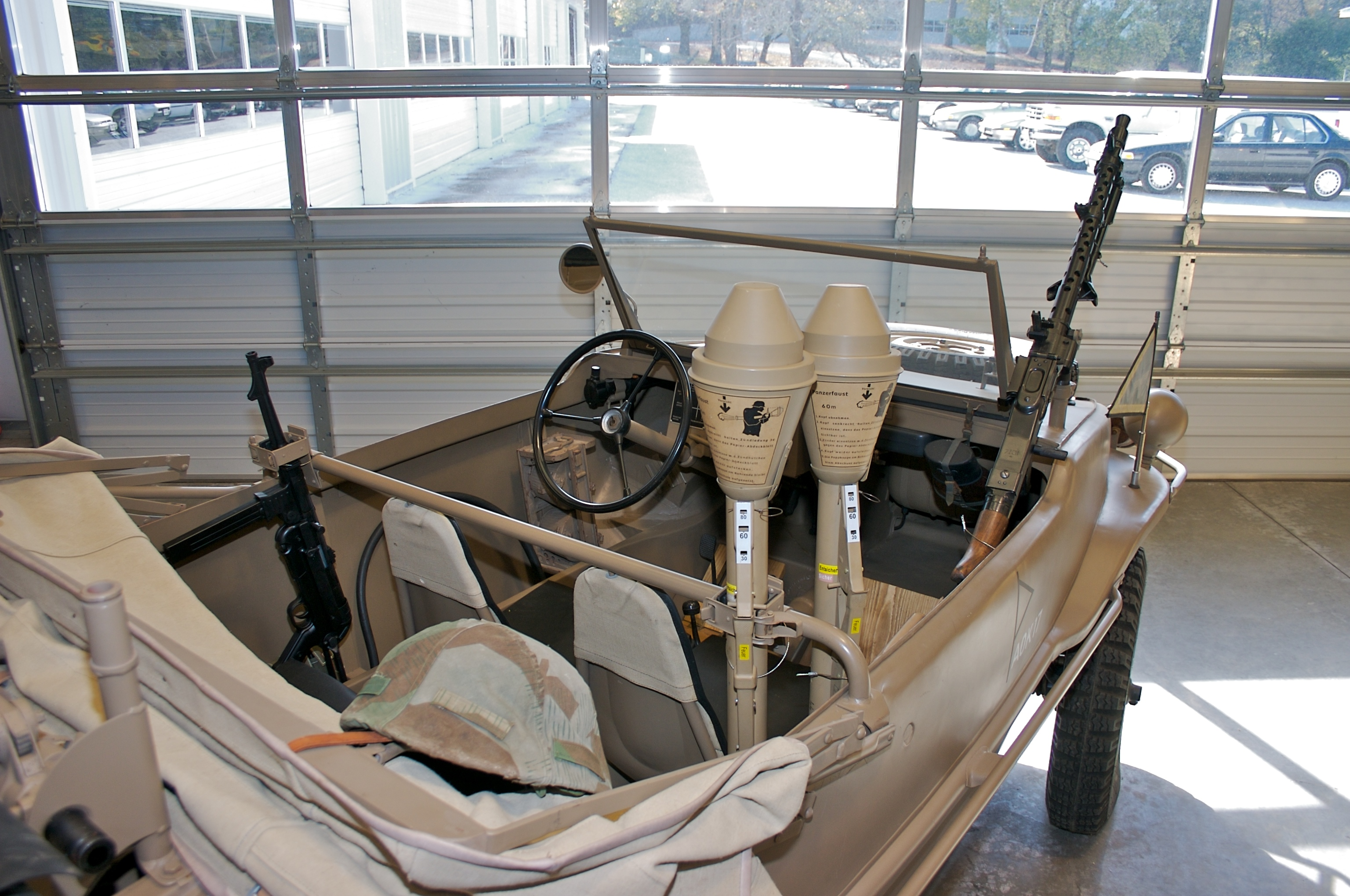
A Schwimmwagen loaded with two Panzerfaust 60 anti-tank weapons

== See also ==
- Trippel SG6 – another German amphibious car used during the World War II
- Amphicar
- GAZ-46 (MAV)
- DUKW – amphibious truck
- LuAZ-967
- Ford GPA – a similar Jeep-based vehicle used by the Allies
- Su-Ki – Japanese World War II boat-hulled amphibious truck

== General references ==
- Pohl, René (1998). Mit dem Auto baden gehen [Going for a Bath With the Car] (in German). Königswinter: Heel Verlag. ISBN 3-89365-702-9.
