= Landing operation =

Type of military operation

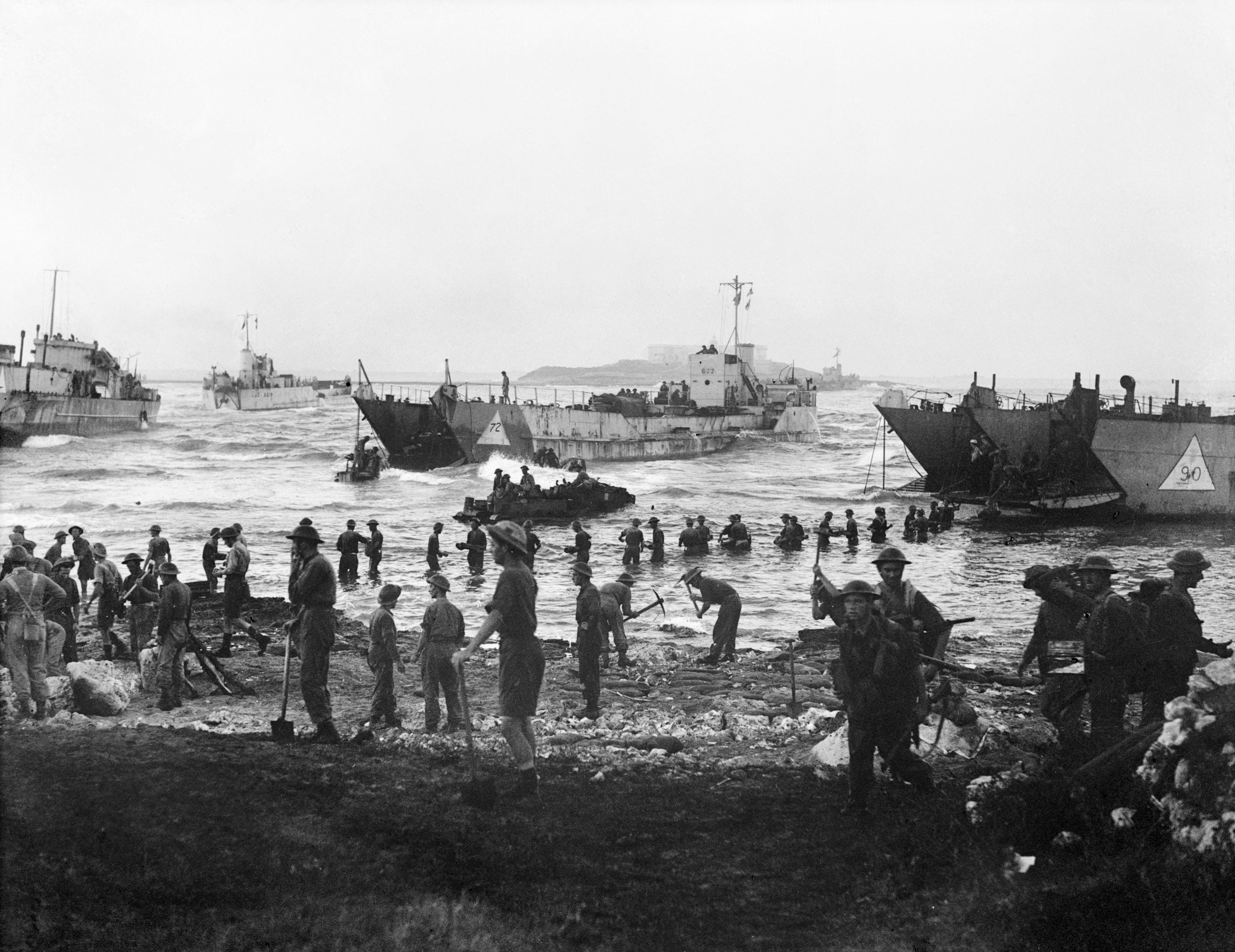
Allied invasion of Sicily, 1943

A landing operation is a military operation during which a landing force, usually utilizing landing craft, is transferred to land with the purpose of power projection ashore. With the proliferation of aircraft, a landing may refer to amphibious forces, airborne forces, or a combination of both.

== Naval landing ==
In a military invasion conducted by sea, the landing and establishment of a beachhead are critical phases. In the Iliad, the landing operation of the Achaean navy is described in book three. Since the Trojans had been warned of the invasion, the beach was defended. In Greek polytheism, the ἱερά ἐπιβατήρια were sacrifices offered to the gods after a successful landing. A λόγος ἐπιβατήριον was a dignified speech delivered upon disembarkation, contrasting with an ἀποβατήριον (apobaterion), the speech delivered upon departure.

During World War II, landing operations were used to great effect during the Normandy landings and the Allied invasion of Sicily on the Western Front, and across the Pacific through leapfrogging during the Pacific War. Later landing operations during the Cold War included the 1950 Battle of Inchon during the Korean War, the 1961 Bay of Pigs Invasion, and the 1983 United States invasion of Grenada.

== Aerial landing ==
Missions of air landing troops, as defined by the U.S. FM 100–5 Operations manual, include seizing, holding, or otherwise exploiting important tactical localities or installations in conjunction with or pending the arrival of other military or naval forces.

Such missions include seizure and clearance of landing fields, beachheads, strong points, and ports; seizure of essential observation or other critical terrain; severing hostile lines of communication and supply; destroying bridges, locks, public utility enterprises, and other designated demolitions; seizing river crossings, defiles, and other bottlenecks; blocking a hostile counterattack; interrupting the movements of hostile reserves; cooperating in the pursuit or breakthrough by ground forces by operating against enemy reserves and lines of communication, and blocking hostile avenues of retreat; and preventing the enemy from destroying essential installations, supplies, and material.

It may also include executing an envelopment from the air in conjunction with an attack by ground forces, executing surprise attacks as a diversion or feint in connection with other air landings or ground operations, or creating confusion and disorder among the hostile military and civilian personnel. Air landing can also provide an attack against an isolated enemy position that is impossible or impracticable to attack by ground forces.

== See also ==
- Amphibious warfare
- Airhead (warfare)
- Beach group
- Bridgehead
- Landing (water transport)
- Normandy landings
- Inchon landings
- Allied landing craft in World War II
