= Siege running =

Siege running mainly refers to naval blockade running, using ships, often minimally armed and armored to give the speed to bring cargo, e.g. food, across naval military blockades. However, it may refer to such procedure using other technology, e.g.:

- Airbridge (logistics), using airplane
- Ground transport
