= Allied landing craft in World War II =

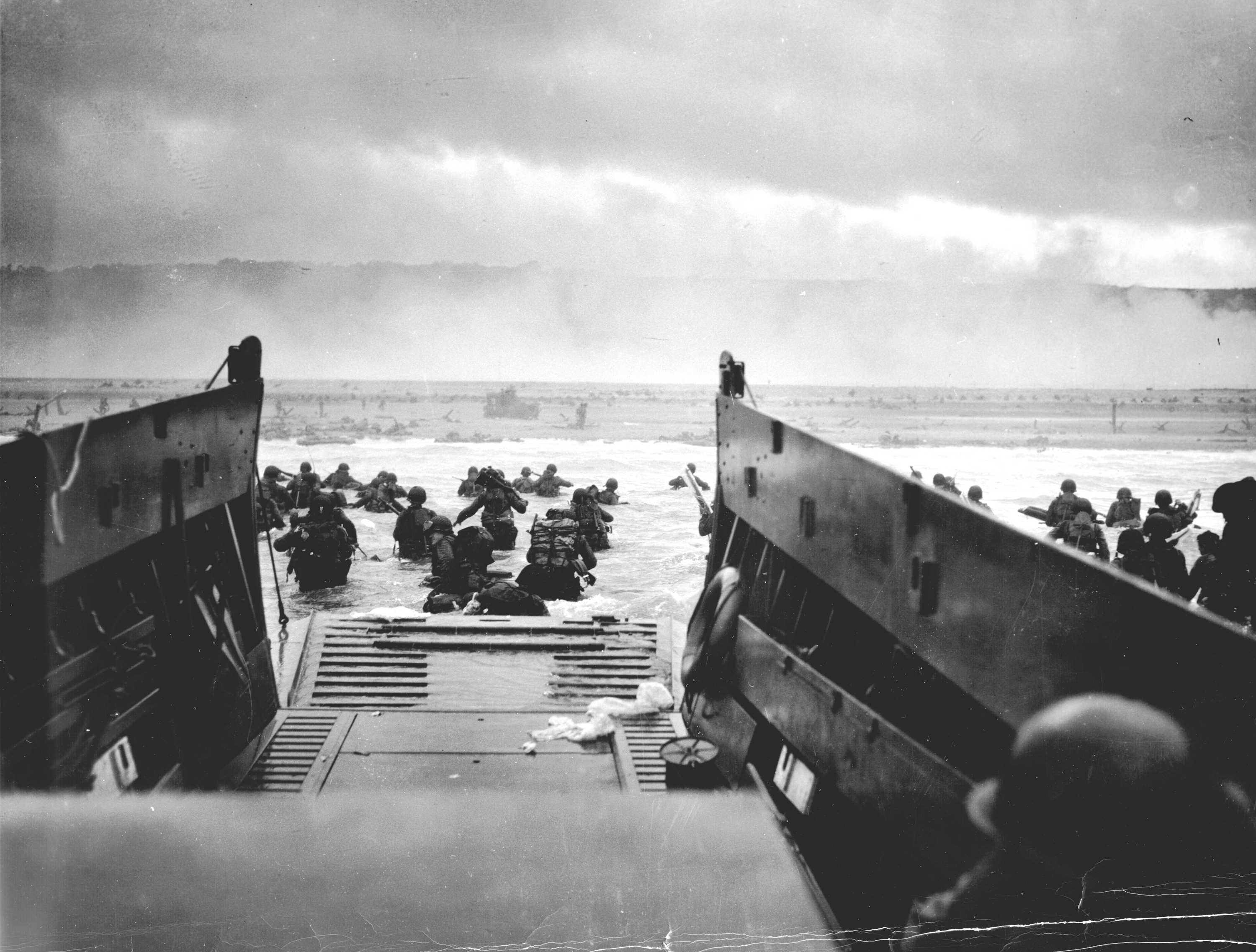
Omaha Beach, 6 June 1944. View from inside the LCM barge

During World War II, the Allies faced an unprecedented challenge with numerous landing operations required both in the Pacific and Europe. This necessitated the design and construction of various landing, supply, and support craft. According to incomplete and imprecise data, thousands of landing craft were built for these operations during the war. The most numerous were assault vehicles (over 20,000 LCA, over 14,000 LVT(1-4) Amtrac, and over 12,000 LCM(1-7)) and Infantry Landing Craft (over 12,000).

This immense effort was crucial in winning the war against Japan and enabled invasions in North Africa, the Italian Peninsula, and Normandy, significantly hastening the end of the war in Europe. The listing here prioritizes the craft involved in the initial stages of operations, attacking beaches and deploying the first waves of Marine infantry. Subsequently, various multipurpose and differently-sized landing craft are presented.

== Amphibious vehicles ==
=== LVT-1 – LVT-4 Amtrac ===
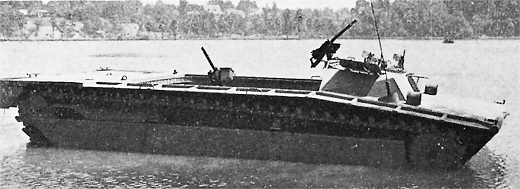
LVT(A)-2 (armored version of LVT-2)

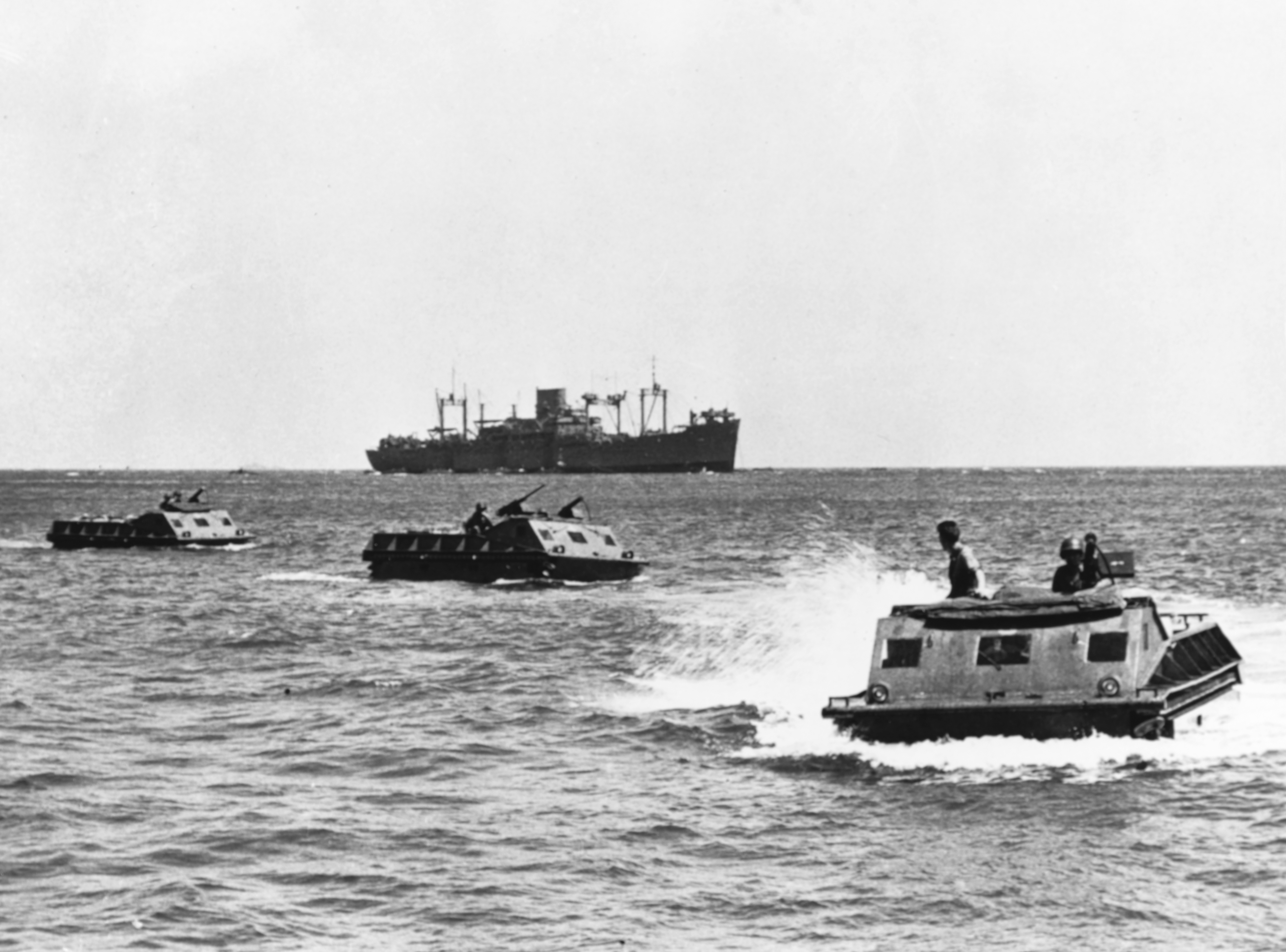
LVT-1 Amtracs during the landing on Guadalcanal

The amtrac was initially based on the chassis of the M3 Stuart tank and was not originally intended for combat. The first amtracs were designed for civilian purposes in the swampy areas of the Everglades in Florida. However, at the beginning of the war, as it became clear that US forces would need to conduct landing operations on the Pacific islands, there was a need to adapt the civilian design for military purposes. This led to the development of the LVT-1 vehicles, followed by the LVT-2 and LVT-4 (Landing Vehicle Tracked). These vehicles were equipped with a 250 HP Continental W970 gasoline engine, allowing a land speed of 32 km/h and a water speed of 12 km/h. The LVTs weighed about 11 tons (up to 13 tons with a load), with dimensions of 7.97 × 3.25 × 2.5 m and a range of 160 km. Armament included optionally mounted 12.7 mm and 7.62 mm machine guns. Some later or modified vehicles received light armor. An innovation in the LVT-4 version was the addition of a rear ramp to the cargo compartment. On their basis, floating fire support vehicles LVT(A)-1 with a 37 mm gun and LVT(A)-4 with a 75 mm howitzer in a turret were developed.

The British Army received a number of LVTs and used them during operations in Europe. They were named Buffalo and Sea Serpent (the latter equipped with two Wasp-type flamethrowers mounted at the front of the vehicle).

Introduced into the United States Marine Corps in 1945, the LVT-3 Bushmaster was a completely new design, particularly notable for its heavy armor, which increased the vehicle's weight to 12,065 kg (17,509 kg with a load). Two Cadillac engines with a total output of 164.1 kW allowed it to reach speeds of 27.3 km/h on land and 9.7 km/h in water. It also featured a rear cargo ramp. The armament was the same as in other amtrac types, and by the end of the Pacific campaign, 2,692 units had been built.

In total, more than 14,000 amtracs were produced during the war across all operational theaters in Europe, Africa, Asia, and the Pacific.

In addition to amtracs, a series of wheeled amphibious vehicles called DUKW, commonly known as "ducks", was developed by GMC, based on a three-axle truck. During the war, 21,147 DUKWs were produced. Many were sent to the Soviet Union, where they were found to be very useful.

The British equivalent of the DUKW was the Terrapin, a 4-axle vehicle with all-wheel drive and two propellers for water propulsion. The Terrapin weighed 6,909 kg, with a full load reaching 12,015 kg. Powered by two V-8 Ford engines, each with 63.4 kW, it had a maximum speed of 24 km/h on land and 8 km/h in water. Around 500 units were built.

=== LCA, LCP, LCV, LCVP ===
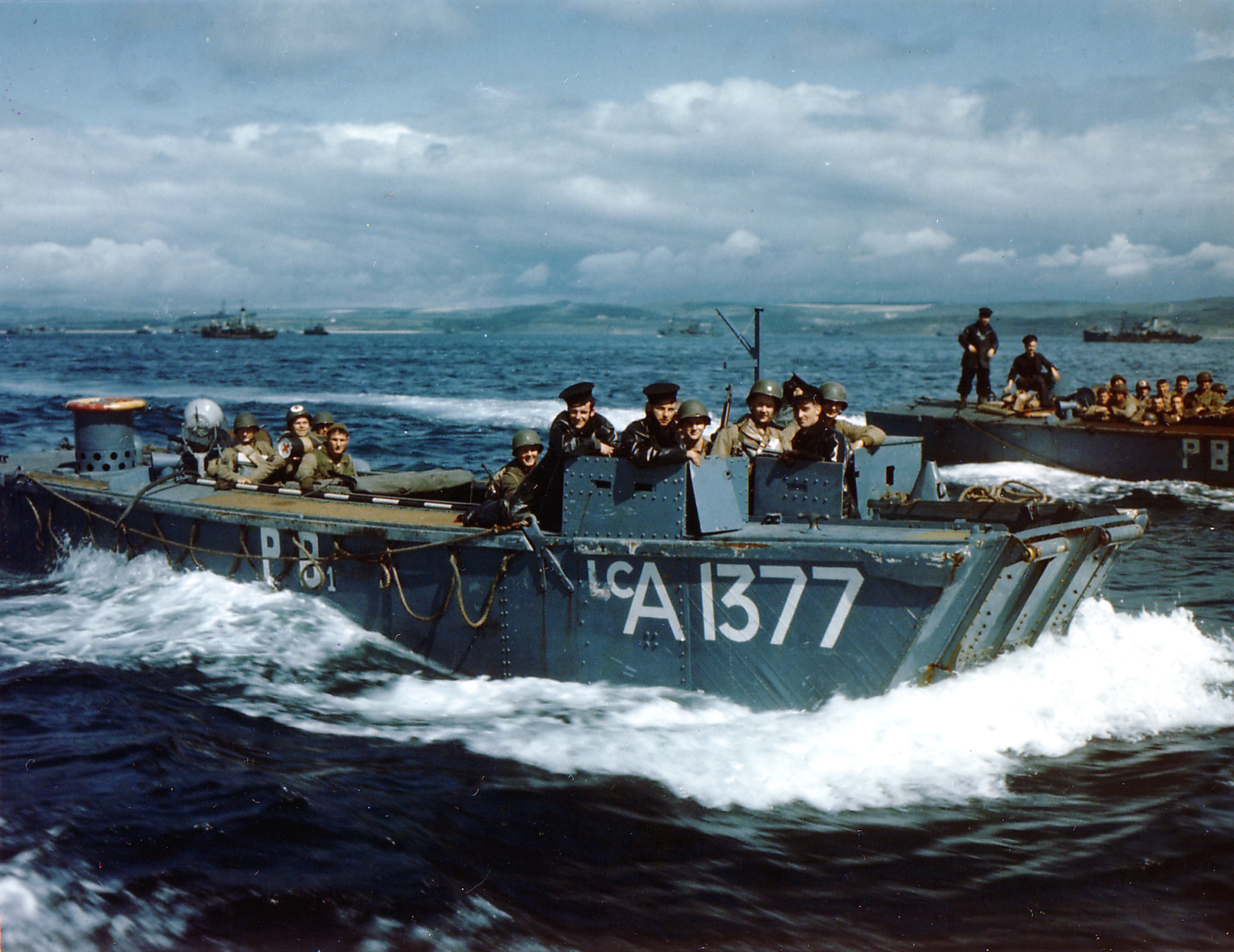
British LCA landing craft

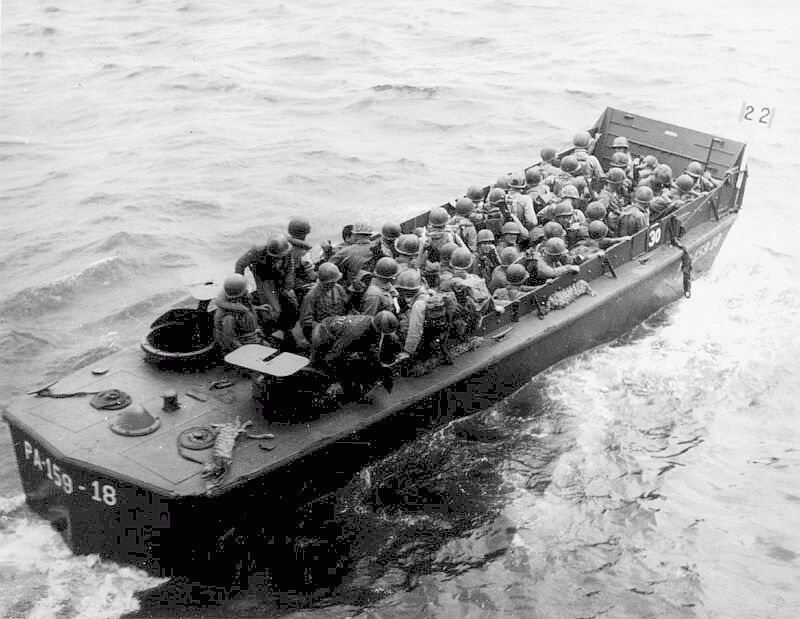
Image showing the cramped conditions on the deck of an LCVP

The basic amphibious vehicle used to transport the first wave of infantry to the beaches was humorously referred to by Marines as a shoe box pretending to be a motorboat. The British equivalent was the Landing Craft Assault (LCA). With a displacement of between 11 and 13.5 tons and a length of 41.5 ft (12.6 m), these craft could carry 35 soldiers. Between 1940 and 1944, 2,030 of them were built. Additionally, around 420 small boats, LCP(2) and LCP(S) (Landing Craft Personnel), with displacements of up to 5.5 tons, were also constructed in Britain.

Before the war, the US began designing landing craft that could be hoisted by the davits of the ships carrying them, capable of transporting a platoon of troops with equipment and arms and landing them near the shore. These craft were based on civilian boats produced by Higgins Industries, commonly known as "Higgins Boats". Initially, the US Marines ordered a 32-foot (9.8-meter) model that could carry 24 soldiers. However, this was soon replaced by a larger 36-foot version, ordered by the British in 1940, designated LCP(L) (Landing Craft Personnel (Large)), of which 2,140 were built in the US. These wooden craft were 11.2 meters long with a full displacement of 8 tons. They could carry 36 soldiers or about 4 tons of cargo, but disembarkation was difficult as troops had to jump over the sides or the bow.

The LCP(R), equipped with a bow ramp for easier disembarkation, was an evolution of this design, with 2,572 units built. Further development led to the LCV (Landing Craft Vehicle), with a large armored ramp, capable of transporting light vehicles; 2,366 of these were constructed. The final and most widely used version of the Higgins landing craft was the lightly armored LCVP (Landing Craft Vehicle, Personnel), with 22,942 produced during the war.

These craft had many flaws, including cramped space, water splashing over the low sides, leaks from the loading ramp, and poor visibility from the helmsman's position, yet they were widely used. The LCVP, with a light displacement of 8 tons and a length of 11 meters, could carry 36 soldiers or a vehicle or gun weighing up to 3 tons. Equipped with gasoline engines totaling between 220 and 450 horsepower, they could reach a speed of 8 knots. The armament included two M1918 Browning Automatic Rifle 7.62 mm machine guns and, in the LCA/HR support variant, four Hedgehog launchers, each with six grenades.

=== LCM(1) – LCM(7) ===
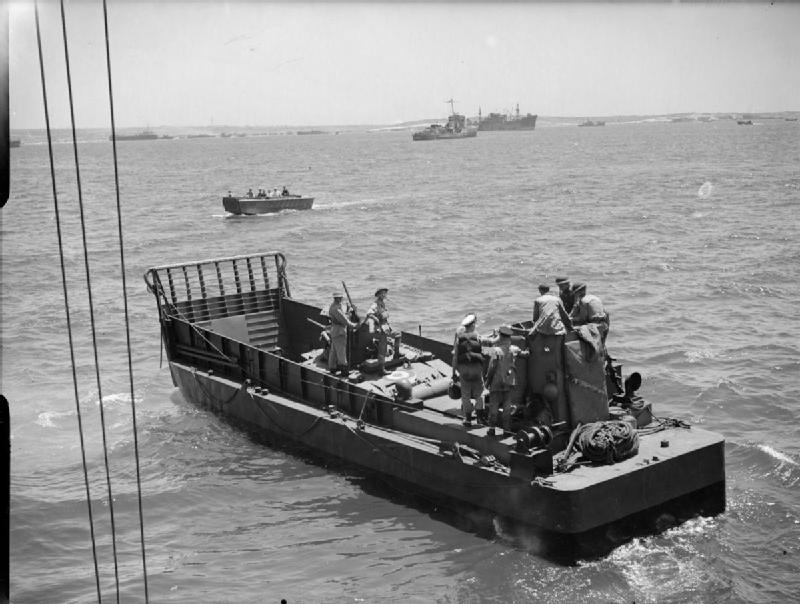
LCM(3) with an M3 Stuart tank

The steel pontoon with railings – that's how British designers praised their prototype of the Landing Craft, Mechanized (LCM), which was first developed in 1929. This initial version was 12.8 meters long, could reach speeds of 5 knots, and was capable of delivering a 12-ton light tank to the landing site. In 1940, the Thornycroft company delivered the production model LCM(1), which was slightly longer (14.8 meters), had a displacement of 36 tons, was a bit faster (7 knots), and could carry a 15-ton tank or 100 soldiers. Although sea trials weren't completed by the time of the Dunkirk evacuation, 12 units were ordered in advance. By 1944, around 600 had been built in Britain.

Meanwhile, the US Marines had their own plans, focusing on the ability to navigate shallow and narrow river mouths in the Pacific. The LCM(3) was designed by Higgins Industries based on an enlarged LCVP design. The LCM(3) was 15.2 meters long, had a displacement of 23 tons empty and 52 tons fully loaded, and could carry a 26.8-ton tank or another military vehicle, or 60 soldiers. Between 1942 and 1945, more than 8,631 LCM(3)s were built. It was the heaviest craft that could still be launched from larger ships using davits.

The LCM(6) was a version that was extended by 1.83 meters amidships to increase cargo capacity and carry 30-ton tanks like the M4 Sherman. A total of 2,513 LCM(6)s were built in the US. The LCM(4), (5), and (7) were British versions. The final British variant, the LCM(7), had a displacement of 63 tons, a length of 18.4 meters, and could transport a 40-ton tank; 150 units were built between 1943 and 1944.

=== Sherman DD ===
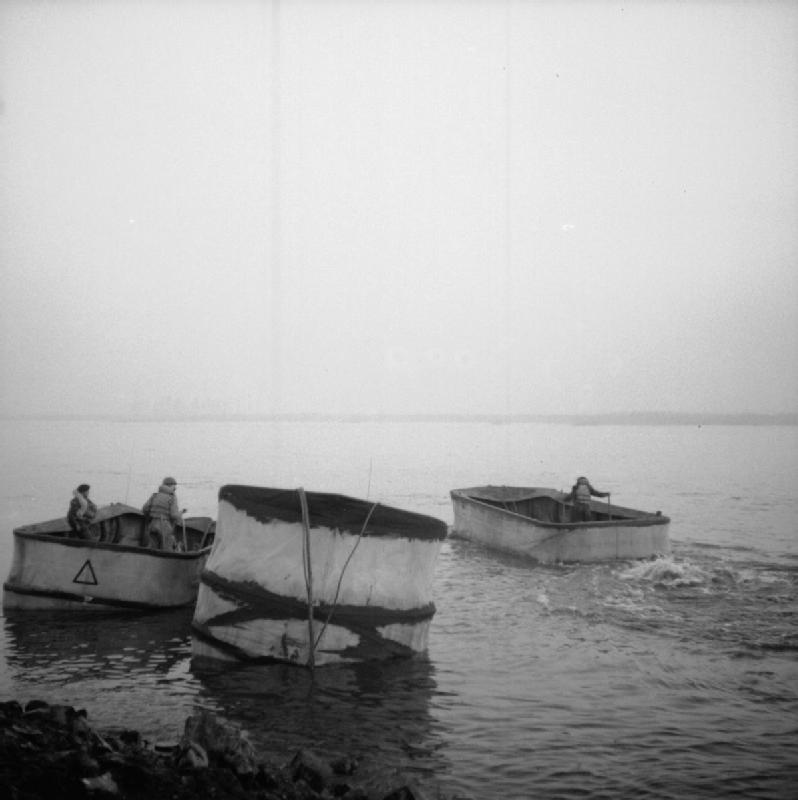
Sherman DD tanks crossing the Rhine

Since 1941, the British had been considering the production of an amphibious tank, which would be invaluable during invasion operations. Trials with Tetrarch and Valentine tanks were unsatisfactory, so they decided to use the design for American Sherman medium tanks. This led to the development of the DD (Duplex Drive) tank, which involved sealing the lower hull, adding a propeller and rudder, and installing a 97 cm tall rubber screen around the hull and turret, which could be erected by the crew in about 15 minutes. The performance of the Sherman DD tanks was not exceptional and was highly dependent on sea conditions (Note: They moved slowly, unsteadily, didn’t respond well to the helm, and often took on water.) – out of 32 tanks deployed too far from the shore on Omaha Beach, 28 sank along with their crews. However, their use during Operation Overlord surprised the Germans, who did not have a similar capability and did not expect tanks in the first wave of the Normandy beach landings.

A total of 560 Sherman DD tanks were built, but production ceased after the liberation of the Netherlands when they were no longer needed to cross the flooded areas of the Scheldt and other large water obstacles. Overall, these tanks proved to be of limited combat utility – their psychological impact was more significant when they appeared on a beach defended by infantry with light weapons.

=== M29C Weasel ===
The smallest amphibious vehicle used by the Allies during the war was the M29C Weasel, a light tracked floating transporter weighing 2,195 kg (2,740 kg fully loaded). It was primarily used for transporting the wounded and resupplying infantry. Due to its low ground pressure, it was also used for crossing minefields. About 8,000 were built during the war. Originally, Weasels were designed as snow vehicles and were not amphibious in their initial M29 version. The performance of the Weasel included a Studebaker Mod. 16-170 gasoline engine with 56 kW, allowing a speed of 60 km/h on roads and 6.5 km/h in water. The vehicle had a crew of three.

== Landing ships ==
=== LSH and AGC ===
British LSH (Landing Ship, Headquarters) and American AGC (Amphibious Force Flagship) were command ships used in numerous amphibious operations in the Pacific and Europe. These were typically converted freighters or passenger liners, appropriately equipped (especially with communication apparatus) and armed (with strong anti-aircraft artillery). They were an essential element of landing operations. Typically, at least two LSH/AP ships participated in such operations because the enemy quickly recognized the importance of these vessels and prioritized attacking them. An example of an AP ship was the USS Ancon, a passenger ship initially adapted as a troop transport and later as a command ship. In this role, it participated in the landing operations in Sicily, Salerno, Normandy, and Okinawa; it also played a part (as one of the escorting ships) in the signing of Japan's surrender in Tokyo Bay.

=== APD ===
High-speed transport ships were converted from old "flush-deck" destroyers or new destroyer escorts. They were used exclusively in the Pacific.

=== LSI(L/M)/AP-APD ===
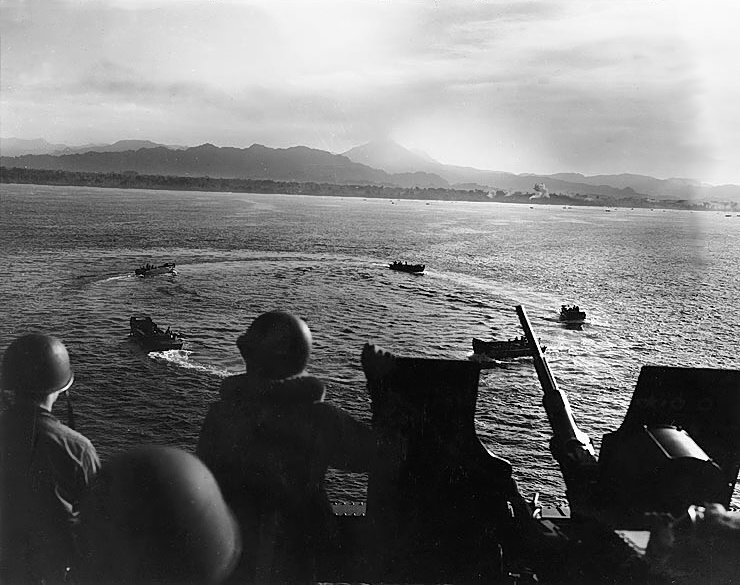
Landing craft – seen from the deck of an APD-type ship – form a convoy before landing on Bougainville Island

Large infantry landing ships (LSI(L), Landing Ship, Infantry (Large), later designated as attack transports (AP), were intended to deliver landing troops and amphibious vehicles to the landing site. In 1941, three passenger ships from the Blue Funnel, Glen and Shire Lines – Glenearn, Glengyle, and Glenroy – were adapted for this purpose, capable of carrying up to 1,300 soldiers, 12 LCA landing craft, and 2 larger LCM landing craft. These units were characterized by very strong anti-aircraft armament.

AP-type ships were built as landing ships. They had a displacement of 11,500 tons (in the General series) or 12,700 tons (in the Admiral series). They could reach speeds of 18 knots, and their range was 22,000 km.

Medium infantry landing ships (LSI(M), Landing Ship, Medium) – converted from medium-sized passenger ships and freighters, mostly Belgian and Dutch, which had taken refuge in British ports after the German invasion – were intended for small-scale landing operations, carrying up to 600 people (own crew, crews of 6 amphibious vehicles, infantry). Such units participated in the Dieppe Raid. Meanwhile, American high-speed transports (APD), converted from old four-funnel destroyers, could carry up to 150 soldiers, 4 amphibious vehicles, four 75 mm howitzers, and 255 m^{3} of supplies. They mainly participated in the war in the Pacific, where – thanks to their strong armament – they were less dependent (than other landing units) on escort ships.

=== LST ===
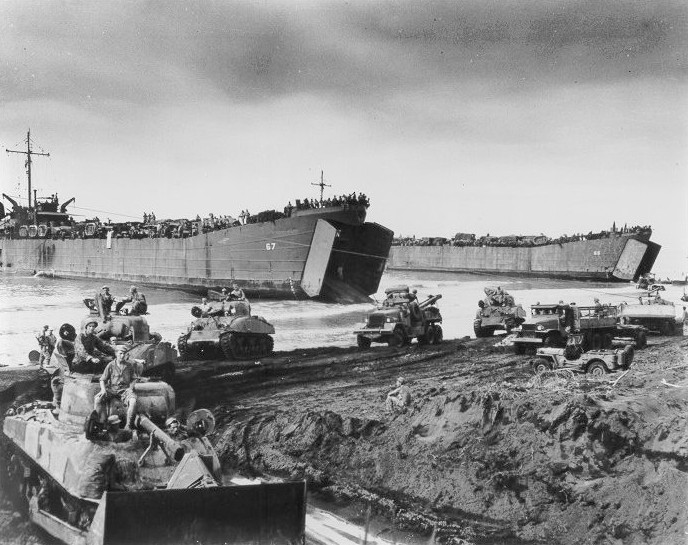
American LST landing ships after unloading combat equipment in New Guinea, 1944

Tank landing ships (LST, Landing Ship, Tank) were built in many types and variants, including the British Maracaibo and Boxer types and Mk 1-3 variants, as well as the American LST(2).

In 1940, following the evacuation of British troops from Dunkirk, Winston Churchill demanded the construction of ships capable of transporting weapons and vehicles across beaches anywhere in the world. (Note: From a speech in the House of Commons on 31 May 1940.) However, designers faced technical difficulties in creating a large, ocean-going vessel that was also flat-bottomed and equipped with a long enough loading ramp for vehicles to drive straight onto the shore. Initially, they focused on three tankers built between 1936 and 1937 specifically for the shallow waters of Lake Maracaibo in Venezuela, with a draft of just 3 meters. During the reconstruction work, it was found that the Maracaibo-type ship could carry 2 LCMs or 20 25-ton tanks and 207 people below deck. A double-leaf door was installed on the bow, from which a two-part ramp, 38 meters long in total, was extended. The weak point was the low speed (10 knots), which is why the Maracaibo ships never progressed beyond the testing phase.

The Boxer project units, which reached a speed of 17 knots and could carry 20 medium or 13 heavy tanks, or 27 trucks with cargo and 193 soldiers, proved to be much better. Four radio antennas provided excellent communication and the ability to direct aircraft to targets, which is why they were reclassified in 1943 as LSF (Landing Ship Fighter-direction).

The next and most successful type was the LST(2), produced in the US according to a British design. By the end of the war, 1,077 such units were built, with a total displacement of 2,160 tons, a length of 100 meters, a width of 15.2 meters, and a draft of 0.9/2.9 meters. Two diesel engines with 670 kW each allowed a maximum speed of 10.4 knots (which this time was no longer a concern, as the entire concept of landing operations had changed – it was no longer about quickly landing a small force but about massive, sea and air-supported landing operations where the speed of units delivering infantry to the beaches was no longer as crucial). Capacity was 2 LCIs or 18 medium tanks, or 27 trucks and 163 soldiers. The British-Canadian LST(3), faster than its predecessor by 3 knots and with greater carrying capacity (5 LCAs or 15 heavy/27 medium tanks, or 14 trucks and 168 soldiers), was a further development. 80 units were built, but they entered service after the war.

=== LSD ===
Landing Ship, Dock (LSD) vessels originated from a British order under the Lend-Lease program. The agreement was for 7 units, but the Americans built 27, keeping the surplus for themselves. The idea came from the fact that the first LCTs had difficulties in high seas and needed to be transported somehow close to the landing site. The Americans used standard floating docks, to which they added a bow and superstructures. These units had low seakeeping but functioned relatively well, especially after lowering the center of gravity. A typical LSD had a displacement of 4,270 tons (7,950 tons fully loaded), was 139.5 meters long, 22 meters wide, and had a draft of 5.3 meters. Two turbines with 8,203 kW provided a maximum speed of 17.5 knots. Capacity was 2-3 LCTs with their crews and 663 soldiers. The ship's own crew numbered 254 sailors and officers.

== Second-line and support vehicles ==
=== LCT(1) – LCT(4) ===
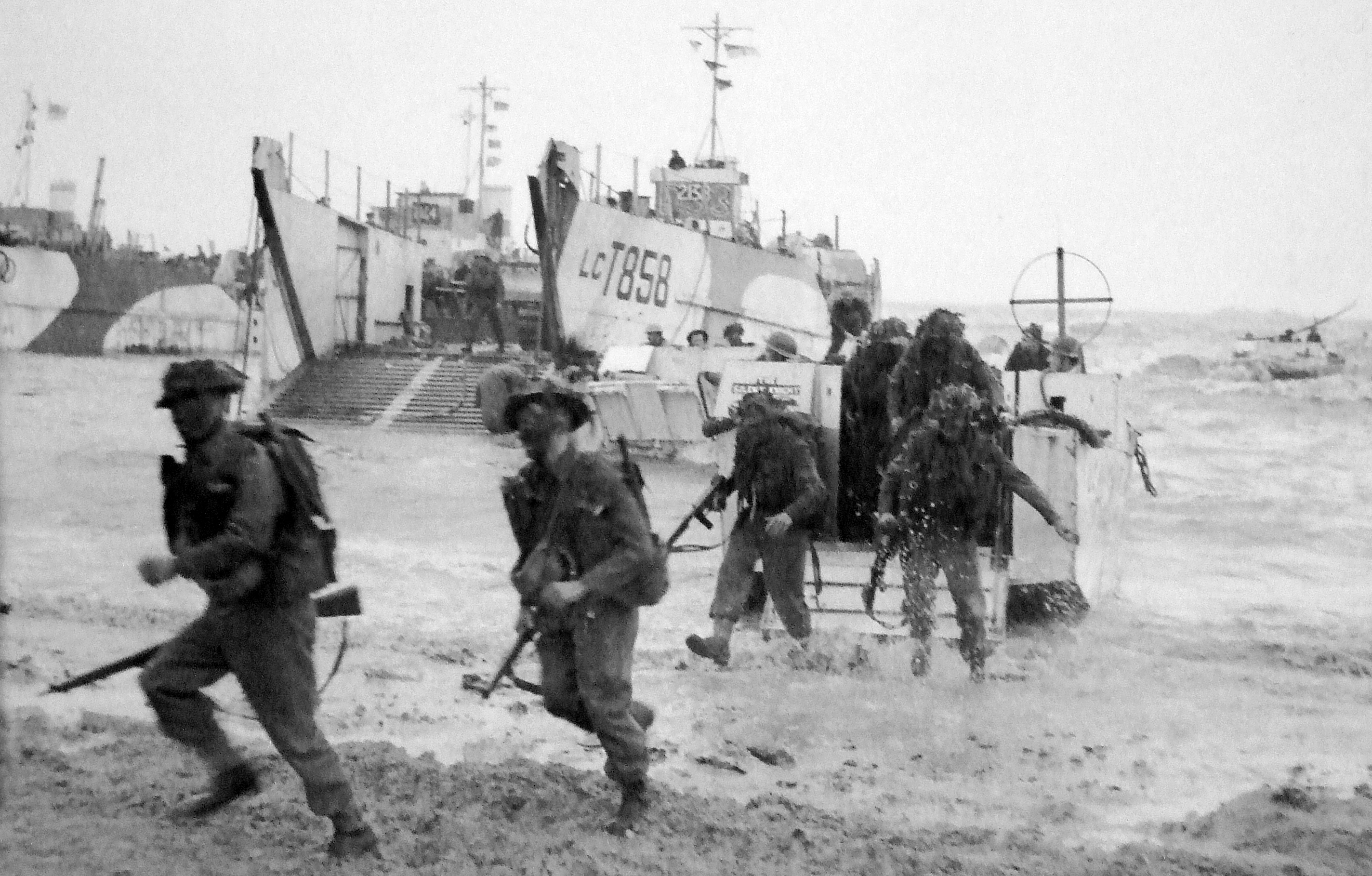
Unloading soldiers from LCA on Gold Beach in Normandy; in the background, LCT(6) landing craft

Among the second-line landing craft, particular attention should be given to tank landing craft (LCT – Landing Craft, Tank) designed to transport tanks and other vehicles. The first LCT models were quite similar to one another. The concept was conceived before the war, but the true impetus came after the lesson learned by the British at Dunkirk when dozens of British tanks, desperately needed back home, were left stranded on the French beaches. Churchill ordered the immediate development of a craft capable of landing or retrieving three 40-ton tanks from a beach. This led to the creation of the British LCT(1) landing craft, which, with only minor modifications, remained in use almost until modern times. The tank compartment was surrounded on the bottom and both sides by fuel tanks, equipment, and armament storage. Initially, the tanks were not covered from above, a flaw later corrected with the addition of a canvas roof. (Note: To reduce the amount of the unit's exhaust that, with the wind from the stern, entered the hold.) The front gate-ramp was not watertight, so it was secured with an additional pair of watertight doors.

The LCT(1) was powered by two Hall-Scott gasoline engines, providing a speed of 10 knots. It had a displacement of 372 tons and a length of 46.3 meters, with 30 units produced. A similar series was the LCT(2), followed by the larger LCT(3) and LCT(4) models, with displacements of up to 640 tons and lengths of between 57 and 58.5 meters. These barges were constructed on land (in automobile or wagon factories) in four (later five) sections, which were then assembled in shipyards. The LCT(4) could transport 6 heavy or 9 medium 30-ton tanks. The draft of early British LCTs ranged from 1.3 to 1.6 meters. The LCT(4) was armed with two 20-mm Oerlikon anti-aircraft guns.

=== LCT(5) – LCT(8) ===
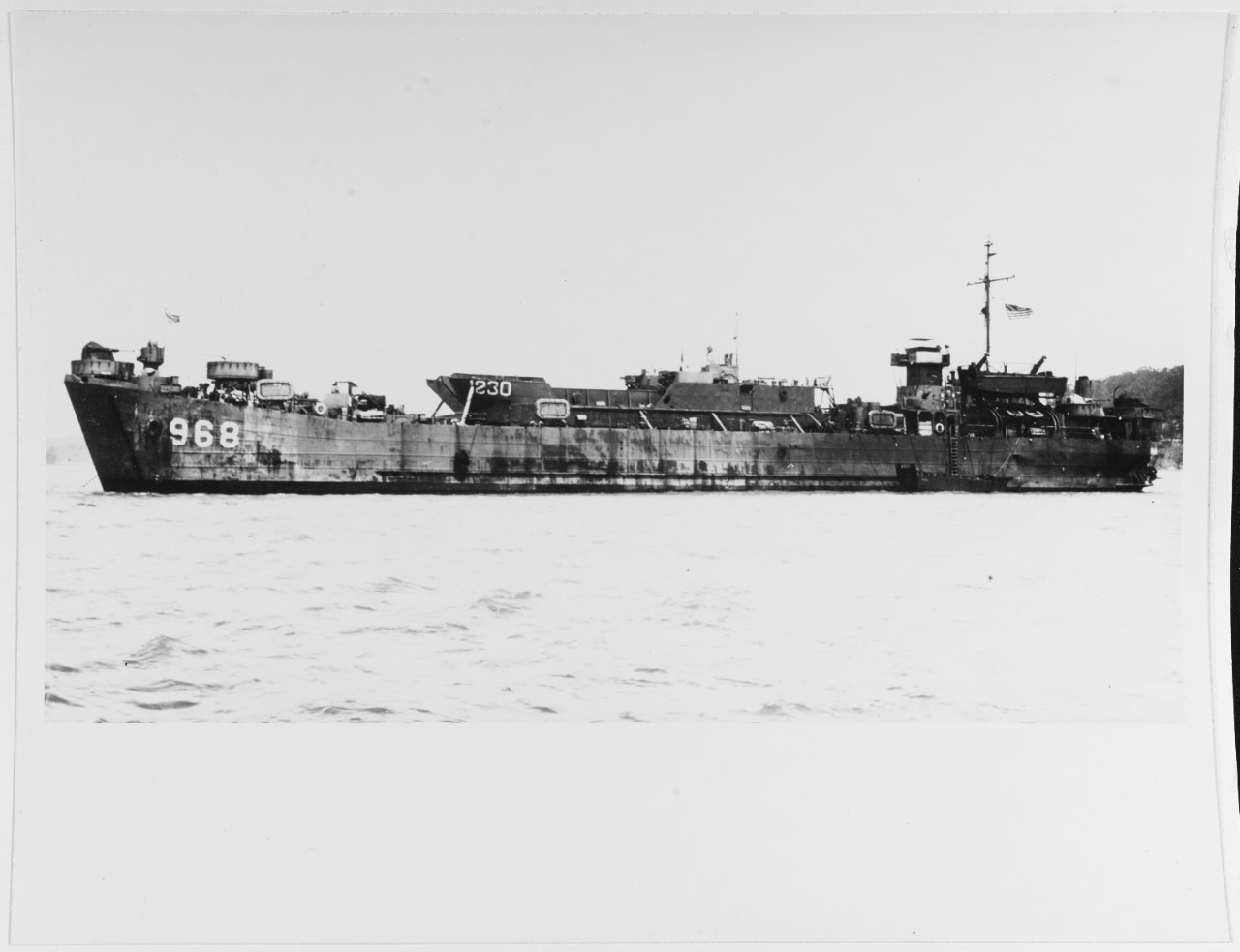
Landing Ship LST-968 carrying LCT-1230 landing craft

The American LCT(5), designed at the British request, measured 34.8 meters in length, had a displacement of 283 tons, and lacked a stern gate. It could carry 4 medium or 3 heavy tanks, with 500 units produced. The slightly larger LCT(6) featured a rear ramp, allowing tanks to pass through from an LST ship; 965 units were built. Both types of craft were smaller than their predecessors, allowing them to be transported on the upper deck of an LST landing ship and launched into the water before loading personnel and military equipment. They landed directly on the beach, which was crucial during the Normandy landings. The LCT(7) was initially designated as a faster landing craft capable of ocean travel, eventually classified as LSM (Landing Ship Medium), with a displacement of between 520 and 1,095 tons, a length of 62 meters, and capable of carrying 3 heavy or 5 medium tanks. The LCT(8) was an enlarged British design (810 tons) but did not enter operational service before the war ended. By the end of the war, over 4,000 LCTs of all types were built.

=== LCI(L) and LCI(S) ===
In 1942, two types of amphibious units appeared almost simultaneously: the Large Infantry Landing Craft (LCI(L)) and the Small Infantry Landing Craft (LCI(S)). The difference in the number of soldiers they could carry was minimal: the LCI(L) could hold 210, while the LCI(S) could hold 200. The actual difference lay in the bow hull construction; the "small" version had a reinforced steel hull to reach as close to the beach as possible, while the "large" version had a wooden construction covered with steel plating.

Another significant difference was the system for delivering infantry to the beach: the "small" version used a bow gate, while the "large" version had two or four ramps lowered on either side of the bow. The British also ordered compartments for 12 bicycles. The armament of both types of units was similar, consisting of between 5 and 6 anti-aircraft machine guns. Their speed, for landing craft, was relatively high – between 14 and 15 knots.

=== LCF and LCS ===
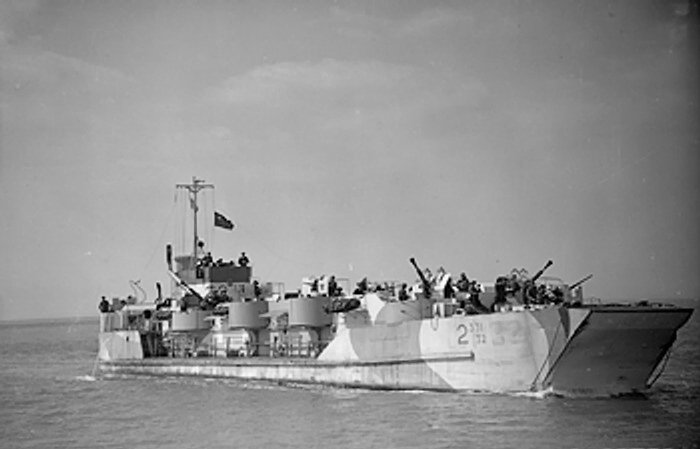
LCF Anti-Aircraft Craft in action

Anti-Aircraft Landing Craft (LCF) and Support Landing Craft (LCS) were generally modified versions of several LCT types, with an additional deck built over the tank compartment, and the bow gate sealed off. The armament varied, sometimes depending on the creativity of the invasion flotilla commander or even the crews themselves. The difference was that LCFs provided (primarily) anti-aircraft support, while LCSs targeted ground and surface targets, armed not only with machine guns but also with 75 mm or even 120 mm guns.

=== LCG and LCT(R) ===
Two more types of support amphibious vehicles were the Gun Landing Craft (LCG) and the Rocket Landing Craft (LCT(R)). These were built on the same hulls as the LCFs, with anti-aircraft armament replaced by powerful artillery (e.g., 120 mm guns from old destroyers) or unguided rocket launchers. The LCT(R) could hold 1,000 rockets in two side launchers, firing in 24 volleys. The impact area of a single volley was 685 x 145 meters, weighing 1.7 tons, with a range of 3.2 kilometers. The rocket launchers were not reloaded during action (as it would take too long), so after the last salvo was fired, the craft served as a ferry between landing ships and landing craft. During the war, 23 such ships were built in the Pacific and 10 in Europe.

== Summary ==
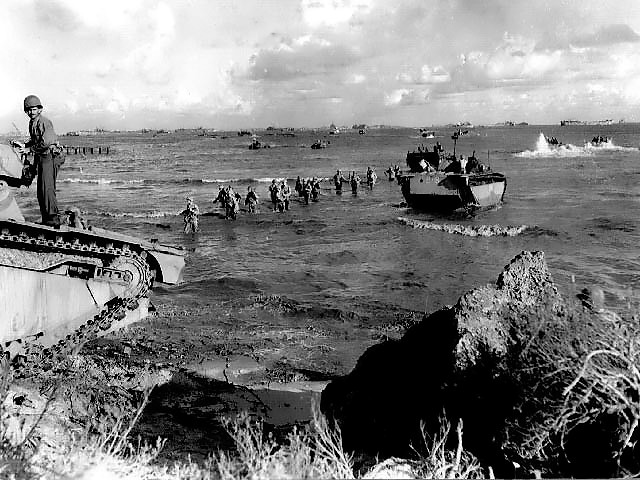
Landing operation on Tinian Island

While work on landing craft was underway in future Allied countries long before the outbreak of World War II, it was the heavy losses suffered by the British on the beaches of Dunkirk that significantly spurred interest in such vessels, leading to numerous orders placed in the US under the Lend-Lease agreement. This, along with growing awareness of the looming war with Japan, pushed the Americans to ensure they had the proper combat means to seize island territories should they fall into enemy hands. In fact, by the time of the attack on Pearl Harbor on 7 December 1941, American engineers had already gained considerable experience in constructing basic types of ships, vehicles, and landing craft. In total, tens of thousands of ships and landing craft of all types were built, with at least several thousand (often with their crews) lost. The smallest vehicles, like the Weasel, were manned by just three people, larger landing craft by four or five, support units by up to 50, and landing ships by between 100 and over 300 personnel. These were members of the US Navy and Home Fleet, but they were treated as second-class sailors, even though they risked their lives equally with the infantry attacking the beaches. According to various estimates, between 40,000 and 48,000 of them were killed or wounded during the war.

=== Participation in the war ===
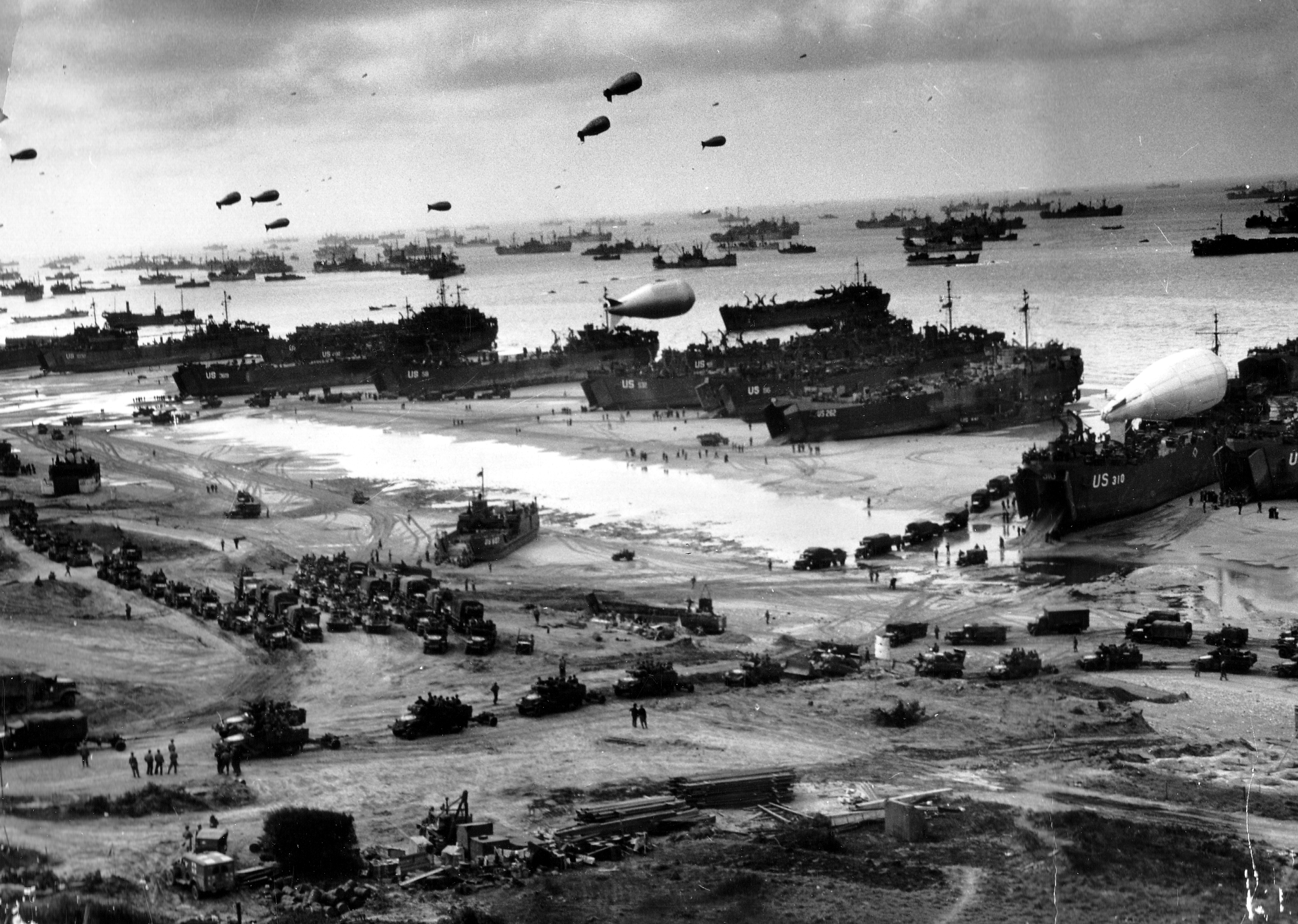
Normandy landings – American LST landing ships at the shore

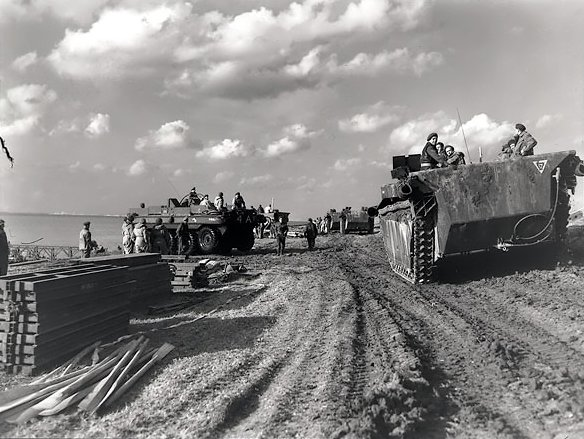
Amtracs (Alligator variant) and British Terrapin vehicles on the Scheldt in October 1944

Produced landing craft and equipment
Assault vehicles
| LVT(1-4) Amtrac | 14,000+ |
| LCVP | 20,000+ |
| LCM(1-7) | 12,000 |
| DD Sherman | 550 |
| M29C Weasel | 8,000 |
Landing ships
| LSH and AGC | 60 |
| LSI(L/M)/AP-APD | 95 |
| LST | 1,077 |
| LSD | 27 |
Second-line and support vehicles
| LCT(1-4) | 2,300+ |
| LCT(5-8) | 1,700+ |
| LCI(L) and LCI(S) | 12,000+ |
| LCF and LCS | 33 |
| LCG and LCT(R) | 624 |

Allied landing craft were present wherever water obstacles had to be crossed, without which gaining an advantage over the enemy would have been impossible. On the Western Front, their first large-scale use (and general rehearsal) took place on 19 August 1942 during the raid on Dieppe, where 9 LCI and 10 LCT were used for the landing, along with 179 other (civilian) barges and boats. At the same time (August 7), the Americans began their Pacific offensive by successfully landing on Guadalcanal. From then on, until the final landing (carried out after the Japanese surrender, with no enemy resistance) on the Japanese Islands, all military operations in that theater began with the landing of amphibious units. Similarly, the American operations in North Africa (Operation Torch), Sicily, Italy, southern France, and even as far as Madagascar began with amphibious landings.

The largest landing operation of all time, however, was Operation Overlord, in which 224 transport vessels and 4,012 landing craft of all types were directed towards the beaches of Normandy. This vast landing armada was supported by a fleet consisting of 6 battleships, 2 monitors, 22 cruisers, 93 destroyers, and over 950 smaller vessels.

Less well-known is the use of landing craft during land battles on the European continent, particularly in the Netherlands (e.g., the landing on Walcheren island at the mouth of the Scheldt) and in the Aegean Sea, where German-held islands were captured, and landings were made in Greece (near Corinth and Patras).

The vast armada of amphibious vehicles that was created between 1942 and 1945 did not meet the standards of pre-war shipbuilding regulations. These units were not designed to be safe or comfortable – their purpose was to deliver troops and equipment to the selected landing sites and provide those troops with the necessary supplies and support, both logistical and military. As General Thomas Holcomb put it, This motley armada could not win the war on its own, but the war could not have been won without it.

== Bibliography ==
- Bishop, Chris, ed. (1998). The Encyclopedia of Weapons of World War II. New York: Barnes & Noble. ISBN 0-7607-1022-8.
- Jane's Fighting Ships of War World II. London: S Studio. 1989. ISBN 1-85170-494-9.
- Piekałkiewicz, Janusz (1999). Kalendarium wydarzeń II wojny światowej (in Polish). Warsaw: Morex. ISBN 83-86510-78-1.
- Gardiner, Robert; Chesneau, Roger, eds. (1980). Conway's All the World's Fighting Ships 1922–1946. London: Conway Maritime Press. ISBN 0-85177-146-7.
