= Terrapin (amphibious vehicle) =

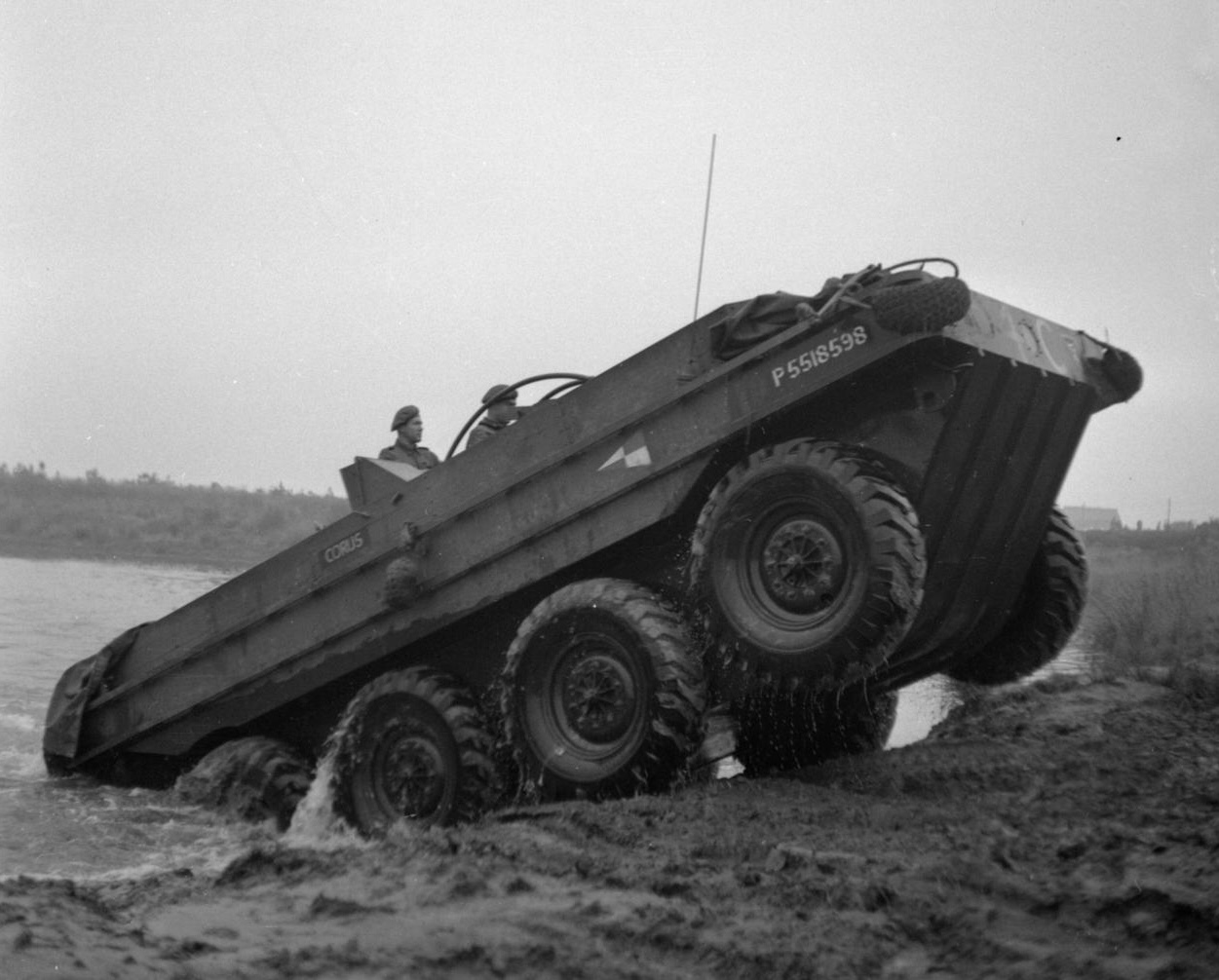
- A Terrapin Mark 1 under test (October 1944)
- Type: Amphibious load carrier
- Place of origin: United Kingdom

Production history
- Designer: Thornycroft
- Manufacturer: Morris Commercial
- Produced: 1943–1944 (Mark I)
- No. built: 500

Specifications
- Mass: 7 tonnes (6.9 long tons)
- Length: 7.01 m (23 ft 0 in)
- Width: 2.67 m (8 ft 9 in)
- Height: 2.92 m (9 ft 7 in)
- Crew: 2
- Main armament: None
- Secondary armament: None
- Engine: 2 x Ford V8; 190 horsepower (140 kW) in total
- Power/weight: hp/tonne
- Suspension: None
- Operational range: 240 km
- Maximum speed: 24 km/h 5 mph (8.0 km/h) in water
- Steering system: Wheel braking

The Terrapin (officially 4-ton amphibian) was a British-manufactured amphibious transport vehicle of the Second World War. It was first used in 1944 at Antwerp during the Battle of the Scheldt.

Terrapins served with the Royal Engineer assault teams of the 79th Armoured Division and were used to carry infantry units (Canadian and British) over rivers.

== Development ==
Due to a shortage of US-manufactured DUKWs, the British Ministry of Supply commissioned Thornycroft to design an amphibious vehicle capable of ferrying supplies and troops from ship to shore for the D-Day landings. Some 500 Terrapin Mark 1 were built by Morris Commercial, the vehicle side of Morris Motors Limited. A Mark 2 Terrapin with a number of improvements reached the prototype stage, but the war ended before it entered production.

== Mark I ==
The Terrapin was powered by two Ford V8 engines mounted side by side, with each motor driving the wheels on one side. Wheel braking was used to steer, the brakes being operated by levers. On a level surface, the vehicle was supported on the four middle wheels, the front and rear wheels remaining clear of the surface (the front pair being raised significantly, the rear pair only slightly). The front and rear wheels provided support and traction on soft surfaces and when climbing slopes, such as riverbanks. When driven in the water, it was propelled by two rear-mounted propellers.

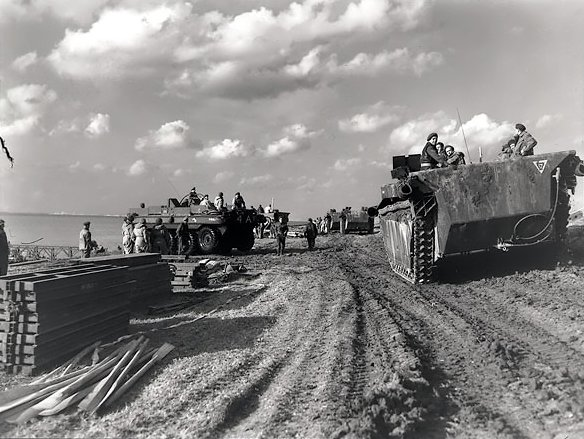
A column of "Alligator" amphibious vehicles passing Terrapin amphibious vehicles (to the left) during the Battle of the Scheldt, 13 October 1944.

The two centrally located engines split the cargo compartment in two and, though rated as a 4-ton vehicle, this prevented large loads, such as heavy artillery or vehicles, from being carried. In addition, the driver had poor visibility as he was centrally located inside the middle of the vehicle. This was compounded by the installation of a canvas cover over the forward hold. As a result, another crew member typically had to stand behind the driver and provide directions. In use, the vehicle was found to be rather slow, and was easily swamped in rough seas. The specification had limited the length to 23 feet (7.0 m) and this made its seagoing characteristics inferior to the American DUKW.

== Mark II ==
The Mark II was similar to the Mark 1, but had a forward driving position. It was a much longer vehicle, being 31 feet (9.4 m) long compared with the 23 feet (7.0 m) length of the Mark I, and had a 5-ton rating. Only five of these vehicles were built.

== Use ==
During the operations against Walcheren, Terrapins and Buffalo transports carried the 9th Canadian Infantry Brigade in what was intended to be a diversionary attack across a mile wide inlet on 9 October 1944. A sufficiently large bridgehead was made that the attack became the main attempt and the German defences were turned.

Terrapins were used in Operation Vitality II on 26 October 1944 to carry units from the British 52nd (Lowland) Division across the Scheldt; Amphibious Sherman DD tanks led the attack.

After the war, Terrapins, together with DUKWs, were used as a form of public transport on the inundated island of Walcheren until circa 1946.

== See also ==
- DUKW
- Su-Ki
- Landing Vehicle Tracked, known as (Water) Buffalo in British service.
- Alvis Stalwart
- Argo (ATV manufacturer)
