= Su-Ki =

Amphibious truck "Su-Ki"
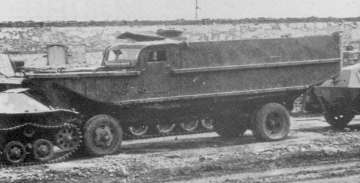
- Place of origin: Empire of Japan

Production history
- Manufacturer: Toyota
- Produced: 1943–1944
- No. built: 198

Specifications
- Mass: 6.4 tonnes
- Length: 7.6 m
- Width: 2.2 m
- Height: 2.4 m
- Engine: 6-cylinder gasoline 65 PS (64 hp; 48 kW)
- Maximum speed: 65 km/h

The Amphibious truck "Su-Ki" was a World War II Japanese military vehicle manufactured by the Toyota Motor Co., Ltd, similar in concept to the GMC DUKW. It entered service in 1943 and was used by Japanese forces in the Pacific during World War II.

== Background ==
The Guadalcanal campaign demonstrated to the Imperial Japanese Army the need for vehicles that could transport supplies directly from cargo ships to the shore and beyond. While the Imperial Japanese Navy had several vehicles (including the Type 4 Ka-Tsu amphibious landing craft) the army had no such vehicles. The Su-Ki was a stop-gap measure until larger and better designed vehicles could be developed.

== Design ==
The vehicle was an amphibious truck based on the Toyota KCY (To-Ki) 4×4 truck. The engine was a inline-six 3.4l Type B engine with power being transmitted to the rear axle via Hotchkiss drive and water propulsion was via PTO drive prop. It could operate in either 2-wheel or 4-wheel drive.

The body was made up of steel and had a "boat shaped" hull, with the hull and other body panels having a 5mm thickness, primarily for protection against rough seas and small arms. The Su-Ki had an unladen weight of 6.4 tonnes and a carrying capacity of 2 tonnes. The cargo was carried on the rear deck with tall sides and an open top, loaded at the rear via a loading ramp.

Between November 1943 and August 1944, 198 Su-Ki trucks were produced by Toyota.

== Usage ==
Su-Ki amphibious trucks were used by the Japanese military forces on Pacific islands during World War II. The vehicle saw use in the Solomon and Gilbert Island campaigns, as well as operations on Ellice Island. The experience of using the vehicle in operations, especially on Ellice, highlighted the need for better design and Toyota developed the experimental "LVT" from the Su-Ki.

== Survivors ==
The only known survivor is a rusted hulk that remains on the Micronesia island of Ponape. The island was not invaded by the Allies in combat, and during post-war occupation the Su-Ki (and other equipment) was not worth the effort to remove from the island.

== See also ==
- DUKW
- Terrapin (amphibious vehicle)
- Schwimmwagen
- Ford GPA "Seep" (Seagoing Jeep)
