= DUKW =

US amphibious transport

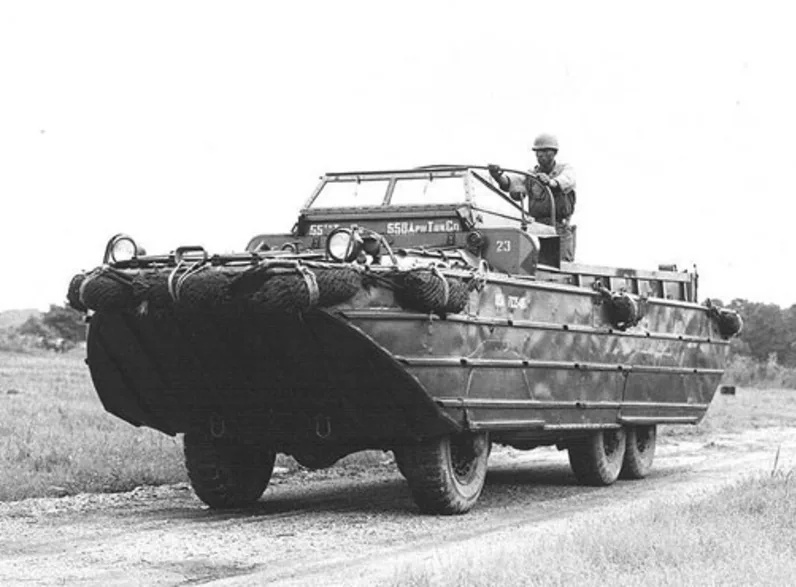
- A DUKW in use by American troops
- Type: Amphibious transport
- Place of origin: United States

Production history
- Manufacturer: GMC Truck and Coach; Chevrolet
- Produced: 1942–1945
- No. built: 21,147

Specifications (Yellow, 1942 ·)
- Mass: 13,600 lb (6,200 kg) empty
- Length: 31 ft (9.45 m)
- Width: 8 ft (2.44 m)
- Height: 8 ft 10 in (2.69 m) with top up 7 ft 1 in (2.16 m) minimum
- Crew: 1
- Main armament: Ring mount for .50in (12.7mm) M2 Browning machine gun fitted to one out of four DUKWs
- Engine: GMC Model 270; 91 hp (68 kW)
- Payload capacity: 5,000 lb (2,300 kg) or 24 troops
- Suspension: Live axles on leaf springs
- Operational range: 400 mi (640 km) on road
- Maximum speed: 50 mph (80 km/h) on road, 6.4 mph (6 kn; 10 km/h) in water

The DUKW (GMC type nomenclature, colloquially known as Duck) is a six-wheel-drive amphibious modification of the GMC CCKW "deuce-and-a-half" 2½-ton trucks used by the U.S. military during World War II and the Korean War.

Designed by a partnership under military auspices of Sparkman & Stephens and General Motors Corporation (GMC), the DUKW was used for the transportation of goods and troops over land and water. Excelling at approaching and crossing beaches in amphibious warfare attacks, it was intended only to last long enough to meet the demands of combat. Surviving DUKWs have since found popularity as tourist craft providing travel across aquatic areas.

== Etymology ==
The name DUKW comes from General Motors Corporation model nomenclature:

- D, 1942 production series
- U, Utility
- K, all wheel drive
- W, tandem rear axles, both driven

Decades later, the designation was explained erroneously by writers such as Donald Clarke, who wrote in 1978 that it was an acronym for "Duplex Universal Karrier, Wheeled".

The U.S. Navy-Marine Corps alternative designation of LVW (Landing Vehicle, Wheeled) was seldom used.

== History ==
The DUKW was designed by Rod Stephens Jr. of Sparkman & Stephens, Inc. yacht designers, Dennis Puleston, a British deep-water sailor resident in the U.S., and Frank W. Speir from the Massachusetts Institute of Technology. Developed by the National Defense Research Committee and the Office of Scientific Research and Development to solve the problem of resupply to units which had just performed an amphibious landing, it was initially rejected by the armed services. When a United States Coast Guard patrol craft ran aground on a sand bar near Provincetown, Massachusetts, an experimental DUKW happened to be in the area for a demonstration. Winds up to 60 knots (110 km/h; 69 mph), rain, and heavy surf prevented conventional craft from rescuing the seven stranded Coast Guardsmen, but the DUKW had no trouble, and military opposition to the DUKW melted. The DUKW later proved its seaworthiness by crossing the English Channel.

The final production design was perfected by a few engineers at Yellow Truck & Coach in Pontiac, Michigan. The vehicle was built by Yellow Truck and Coach Co. (GMC Truck and Coach Div. after 1943) at their Pontiac West Assembly Plant and Chevrolet Div. of General Motors Corp. at their St. Louis Truck Assembly Plant; 21,147 were manufactured before production ended in 1945.

== Description ==
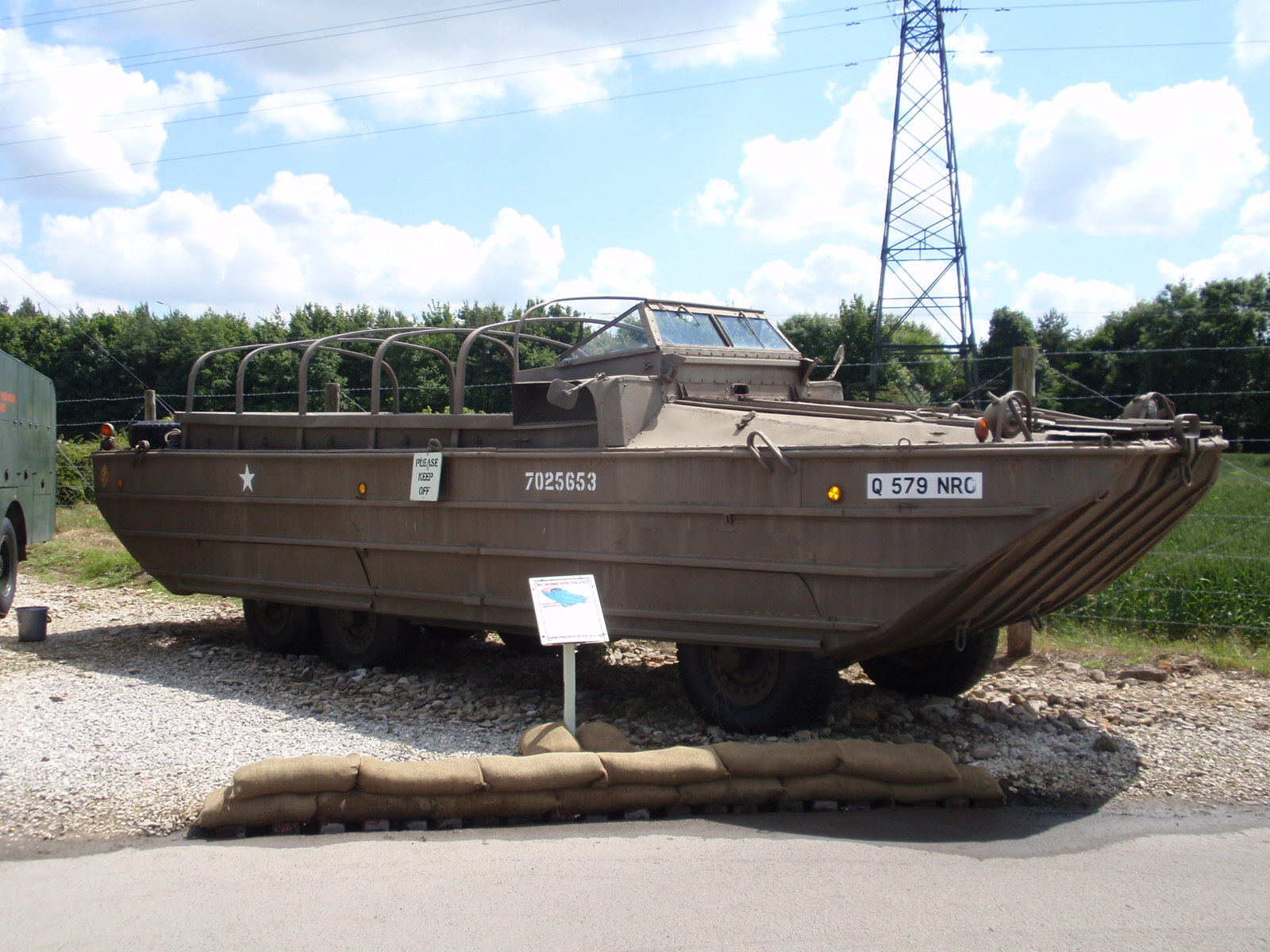
A DUKW at the Eden Camp Museum in Yorkshire, England

The DUKW was built around the GMC AFKWX, a cab-over-engine (COE) version of the GMC CCKW six-wheel-drive military truck, with the addition of a watertight hull and a propeller. It was powered by a 269.5 cu in (4,416 cc) GMC Model 270 straight-six engine. A five-speed overdrive transmission drove a transfer case to drive the axles, then a two-speed transfer case for the propeller. The propeller and front axle were selectable from their respective transfer cases. A power take-off on the transmission drove an air-compressor and winch. It weighed 13,000 lb (5,900 kg) empty and operated at up to 50 miles per hour (80 km/h) on road or 5.5 knots (6.3 mph; 10.2 km/h) on water. It was 31 feet (9.45 m) long, 8 feet 3 inches (2.51 m) wide, 7 feet 2 inches (2.18 m) high with the folding-canvas top down and 8 feet 9 inches (2.67 m) high with the top up.

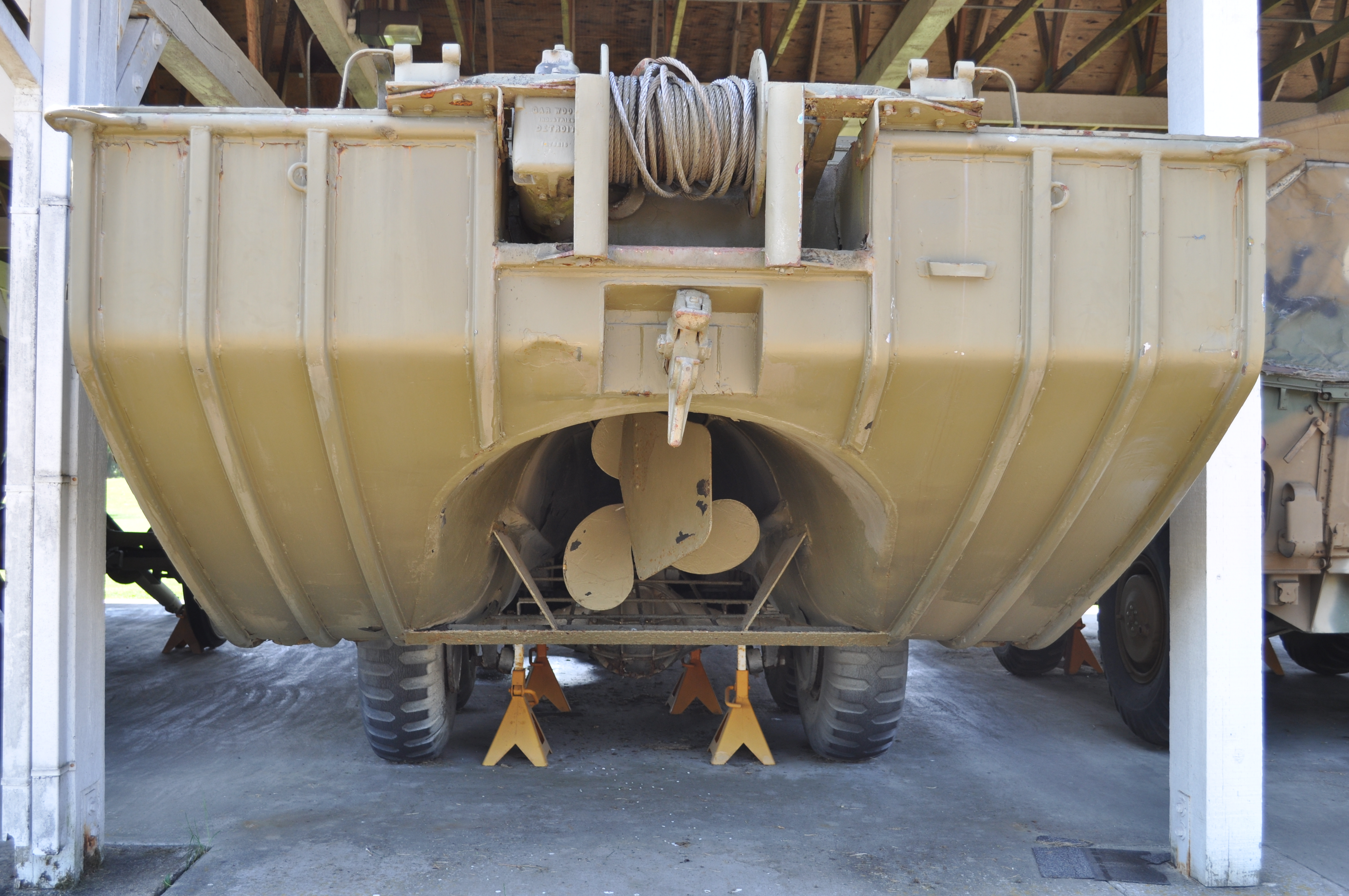
Rear view of a DUKW preserved at the Fort Lewis Military Museum, Washington. The propeller tunnel, propeller, and rudder can be seen (2009).

It was not an armored vehicle, being plated with sheet steel between 1/16 and 1/8 inch (1.6 and 3.2 mm) thick to minimize weight. A high-capacity bilge pump system kept it afloat if the thin hull was breached by holes up to 2 inches (50 mm) in diameter. One in four DUKWs mounted a .50-caliber Browning heavy machine gun on a ring mount.

The DUKW was the first vehicle to allow the driver to vary the tire pressure from inside the cab. The tires could be fully inflated for hard surfaces such as roads and less inflated for softer surfaces, especially beach sand. This added to its versatility as an amphibious vehicle. This feature is now standard on many military vehicles.

== Service history ==
=== World War II ===
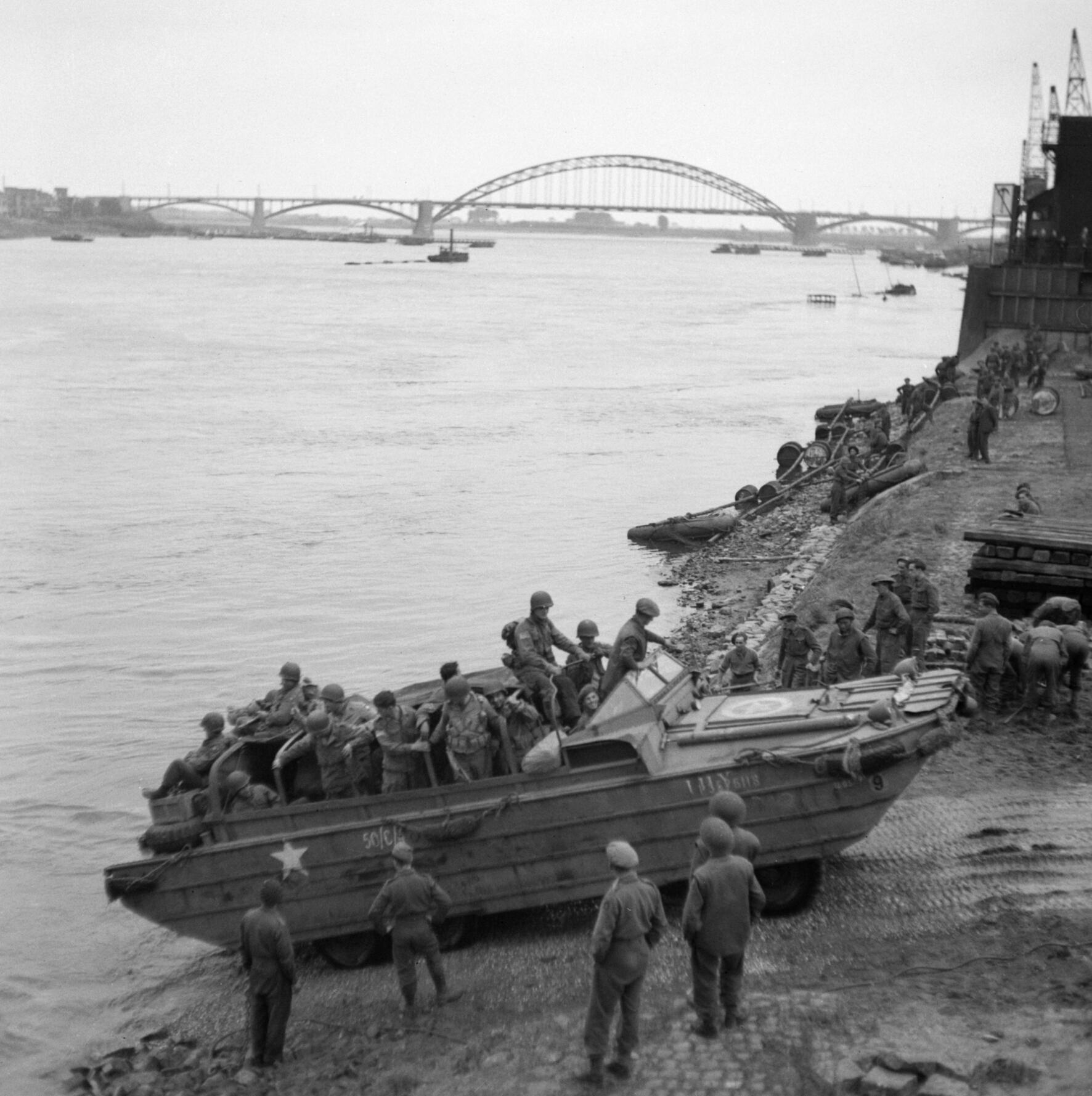
A British DUKW carries American airborne troops and supplies across the River Waal at Nijmegen, 30 September 1944.

The DUKW was supplied to the U.S. Army, U.S. Marine Corps and Allied forces, and 2,000 were supplied to Britain and Canada under the Lend-Lease program; 535 were acquired by Australian forces, and 586 were supplied to the Soviet Union, which built its own version, the BAV 485, after the war. DUKWs were initially sent to Guadalcanal in the Pacific theater, but were used by an invasion force for the first time in the European theater, during the Sicilian invasion, Operation Husky and the invasion of Italy, Operation Shingle, in the Mediterranean.

They were used on the D-Day beaches of Normandy and in the Battle of the Scheldt, Operation Veritable, and Operation Plunder.

In the Pacific, USMC DUKWs were used to cross the coral reefs of islands such as Saipan and Guam and the tires were not affected by the coral.

Some DUKWs used in WWII were reported to have capsized while landing at Omaha Beach during the Normandy invasion.

DUKWs were also used in Lake Garda in Italy by the 10th Mountain Division in the final days of the war. One sank while crossing from Torbole sul Garda to Riva del Garda on the evening of 30 April 1945, drowning 25 out of the 26 onboard. A documentary about the event, The Lost Mountaineers, premiered in 2023. Two other DUKWs used in operation sank without casualties.

=== After the war ===
After World War II, reduced numbers were kept in service by the United States, Britain, France, and Australia, with many stored pending disposal. Australia transferred many to Citizens Military Force units.

The U.S. Army reactivated and deployed several hundred at the outbreak of the Korean War with the 1st Transportation Replacement Training Group providing crew training. DUKWs were used extensively to bring supplies ashore during the Battle of Pusan Perimeter and in the amphibious landings at Incheon.

Ex-U.S. Army DUKWs were transferred to the French military after World War II and were used by the Troupes de marine and naval commandos. Many were used for general utility duties in overseas territories. France deployed DUKWs to French Indochina during the First Indochina War. Some French DUKWs were given new hulls in the 1970s, with the last being retired in 1982.

Britain deployed DUKWs to Malaya during the Malayan Emergency of 1948–60. Many were redeployed to Borneo during the Indonesia–Malaysia confrontation of 1962–66.

=== Later military use ===
The Royal Marines used five of these vehicles for training at 11 (Amphibious Trials and Training) Squadron, 1 Assault Group Royal Marines at Instow, North Devon. Four were manufactured between 1943 and 1945. The fifth is a DUKW hull copy manufactured in 1993 with unused World War II-vintage running gear parts. In 1999, a refurbishment programme began to extend their service life to 2014. DUKWs were removed from service in 2012.

The DUKWs were used for safety, allowing all ranks to undertake training drills for boat work for the landing craft ranks, and drivers undertaking wading drills from the Landing Craft Utility.

=== Principal military users ===
- United States
- Australia – 535
- Argentina
- Brazil
- Canada – about 800
- Dominican Republic
- France
- Philippines
- Iraq
- Soviet Union – 586
- United Kingdom – about 2,000

== Developments ==
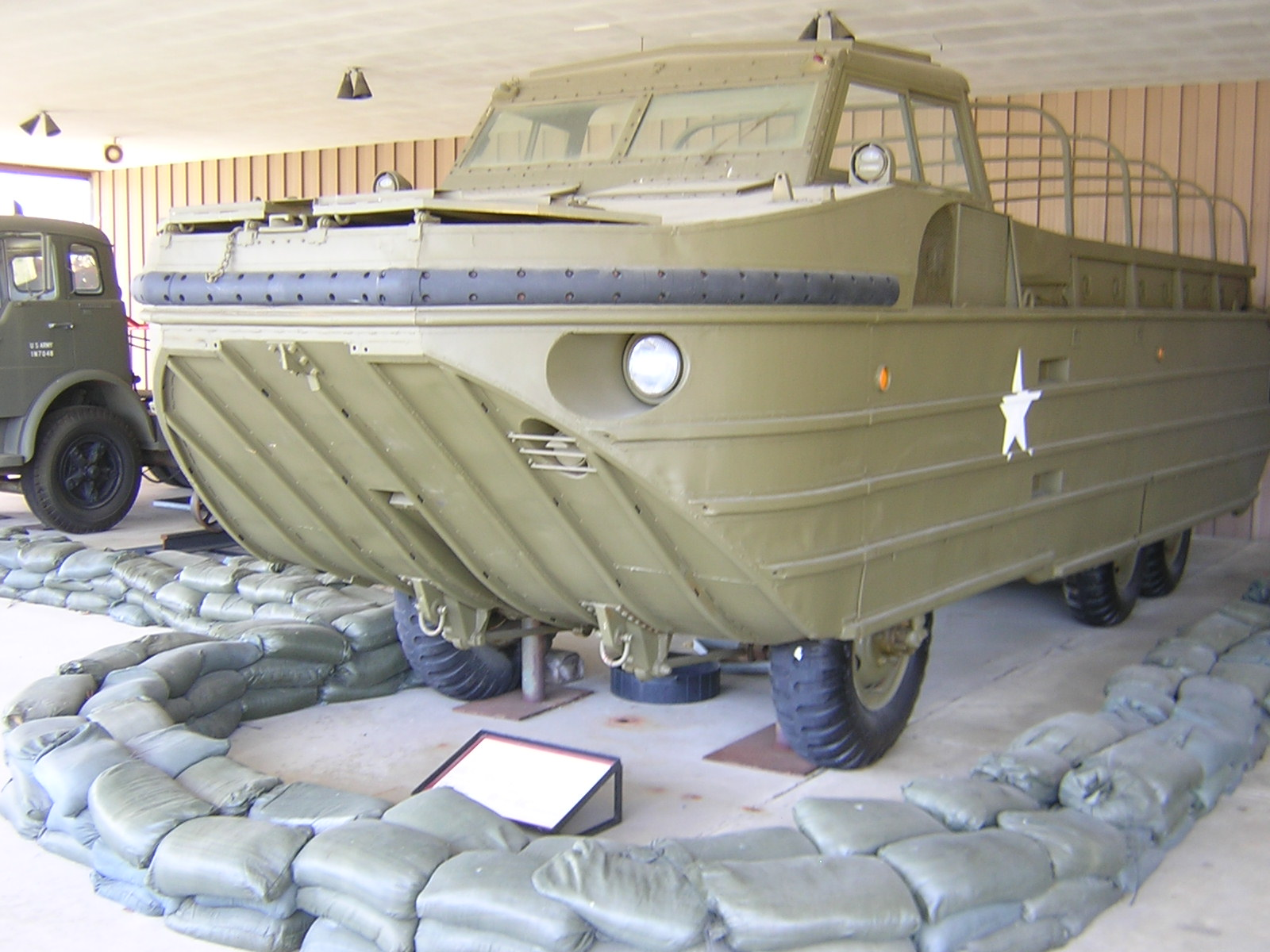
Superduck prototype

In the latter 1940s and throughout the 1950s, while Speir, now project engineer for the Army's Amphibious Warfare Program, worked on "bigger and better" amphibious vehicles such as the "Super Duck", the "Drake", and the mammoth BARC (Barge, Amphibious, Resupply, Cargo), many DUKWs were made surplus and used as rescue vehicles by fire departments and Coast Guard stations.

In 1952, the Soviet Union produced a derivative, the BAV 485, adding a rear loading ramp. The Zavod imeni Stalina factory built it on the structure of its ZiS-151 truck, and production continued until 1962, with over 2,000 units delivered.

== Civilian use ==
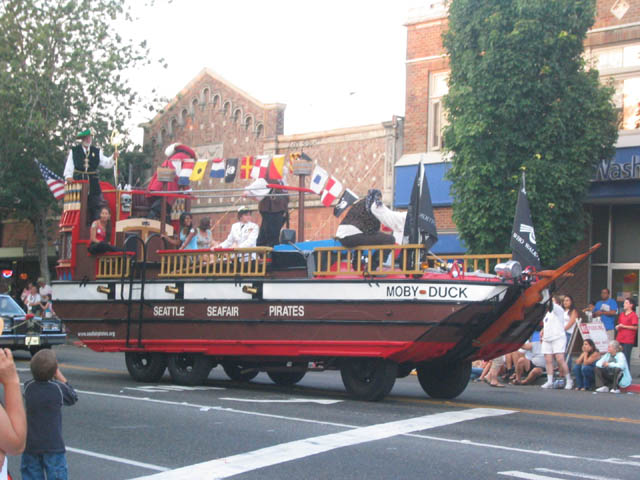
The "Moby Duck" at a parade in Seattle (2006)

Many were used after WWII by civilian organizations such as the police, fire departments, and rescue units. DUKWs were used for oceanographic research in Northern California, as related by participant Willard Bascom. Drivers learned that DUKWS were capable of surfing large winter Pacific waves, with care (and luck).

The Australian Army lent two DUKWs and crew to Australian National Antarctic Research Expeditions for a 1948 expedition to Macquarie Island. Australian DUKWs were used on Antarctic supply voyages until 1970. From 1945 to 1965, the Australian Commonwealth Lighthouse Service supply ship Cape York carried ex-Army DUKWs for supplying lighthouses on remote islands.

One DUKW is in use by the Technisches Hilfswerk (THW) of Germersheim in Germany, a civil protection organisation.

== Tourist attractions ==
DUKWs are still in use as tourist transport in harbor and river cities across the globe. The first "duck tour" company was started in 1946 by Mel Flath in Wisconsin Dells, Wisconsin. The company is still in operation under the name Original Wisconsin Ducks.

== See also ==
- Ford GPA, four-wheel amphibious jeep
- GAZ-46
- LARC-V
- Landing Vehicle Tracked, tracked supply and combat amphibious vehicle
- List of U.S. military vehicles by supply catalog designation
- Landwasserschlepper
- PTS
- Su-Ki, a Japanese equivalent vehicle
- Terrapin (amphibious vehicle), a British equivalent vehicle
- ZiS-485
