= Lodgement =

Enclave taken by and defended by force of arms

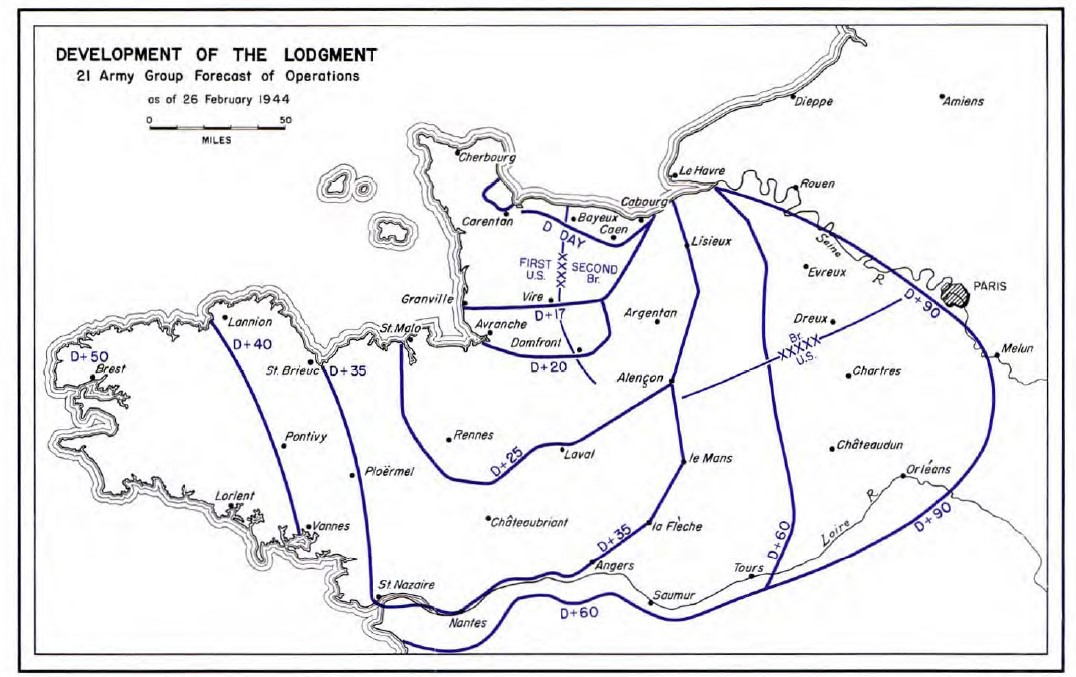
A map showing the pre-invasion Allied plans for the development of the lodgement area in France during Operation Overlord

A lodgement or lodgment is an enclave, taken and defended by force of arms against determined opposition, made by increasing the size of a bridgehead, beachhead, or airhead into a substantial defended area, at least the rear parts of which are out of direct line of fire. An example is Operation Overlord, the establishment of a large-scale lodgement in Normandy during World War II. Another example is the Second Punic War, in which Gnaeus Cornelius Scipio Calvus, and later Publius Scipio, established a well-sized lodgement in North Eastern Spain.
