= Airhead =

Designated area in hostile territory for landing transport aircraft

An airhead is a designated area in a hostile or threatened territory which, when seized and held, allows the air landing of further teams and materiel via an airbridge, and provides the maneuver and preparation space necessary for projected operations. Normally, it is the area seized in the assault phase of an airborne operation. It may also be used as a staging or refueling point for less permanent operations.

Typically, an airhead is established by helicopter-landed or paratrooper forces, and often will take place at an airport (to allow conventional transport to land later on) or at a helicopter or glider-accessible area.

Notable airhead operations include Battle of Crete and Operation Market Garden during World War II, and Operation Just Cause in Panama in 1989. Operation Castor was intended to establish an offensive airhead, but quickly degenerated into the Siege of Dien Bien Phu. Another recent example includes the Battle of Hostomel Airport.

== See also ==
- Beachhead
- Bridgehead
- Lodgement
