= Airbridge (logistics) =

Logistics and military term

An airbridge is the route and means of delivering material from one place to another by an airlift.

An airbridge is the means by which an airhead is kept supplied by flying over enemy held territory. An airlift over an airbridge can also be used when the most convenient means of transport is by air, or as an additional supplement to other forms of transport.

During the Second World War, the Germans used air bridges on three major occasions: the Demyansk Pocket, the Battle of Stalingrad and the Kuban bridgehead. As Demyansk turned into a German victory with the success of the bridge, Hermann Göring convinced Hitler a similar method could be used to supply the Sixth Army at Stalingrad. However, the Luftwaffe was never able to send in the necessary 800 tons of supplies per day. The Kuban Airlift from February–March 1943 was much more successful as the German air units in the Taman Peninsula had access to established airfields with good supply and maintenance facilities, the weather was more favorable and Soviet opposition was much weaker than at Stalingrad. In February 1943, the Germans evacuated 50,000 men by air from the northwestern Caucasus to the Crimea and Ukraine. German units within the Kuban bridgehead received by air a daily ration of 500 tons of ammunition, food, fuel and other supplies, which would have been enough to keep 6th Army in Stalingrad operational. Some 2,000 men were airlifted every day from the Kuban bridgehead. At maximum effort, the Caucasus airlift brought in 700 tons of supplies and evacuated 5,000 men on a daily basis.

During Croatian War of Independence and Bosnian War, Croatian government supplied Bosnian 5th Corps in Bihać enclave surrounded by Serb forces. The Fifth Corps was supplied by materiel using Mi-8/17 helicopters and smaller airplanes. The missions were flown by foreign mercenary pilots from Ukraine, Russia and Hungary for a fee of 5000 Deutsche Marks per flight as these missions were considered very dangerous. Out of 101 organized flights, 91 were successful and 10 failed.

Two of the largest airbridges in history were: The Hump, (the name given by Allied pilots in the Second World War to the eastern end of the Himalayan Mountains over which they flew from India to China to resupply the Chinese Government forces of Chiang Kai-shek) and the US XX Bomber Command (during Operation Matterhorn); and the Berlin Airlift, to overcome the Berlin Blockade from 24 June 1948 through to 11 May 1949.

Following the 1982 Falklands War, the United Kingdom established the Falklands Airbridge (also known as the RAF Airbridge or South Atlantic Airbridge) between RAF Brize Norton in the UK and RAF Mount Pleasant in the Falkland Islands (via RAF Ascension Island). The service facilitates both civilian and tourist air connectivity and reinforces the British Forces South Atlantic Islands garrison.

== See also ==
- Blockade runner, a means of delivering material by ship to a port in naval blockade.
- Airlift, an organized delivery of supplies or personnel primarily via aircraft.
