= Bridgehead =

Strategically important position on a river crossing which enemy forces seek to control

In military strategy, a bridgehead (or bridge-head) is the strategically important area of ground around the end of a bridge or other place of possible crossing over a body of water which at time of conflict is sought to be defended or taken over by the belligerent forces.

Bridgeheads typically exist for only a few days, the invading forces either being thrown back or expanding the bridgehead to create a secure defensive lodgement area, before breaking out into enemy territory, such as when the U.S. 9th Armored Division seized the Ludendorff Bridge at Remagen in 1945 during World War II. In some cases a bridgehead may exist for months.

== Etymology ==
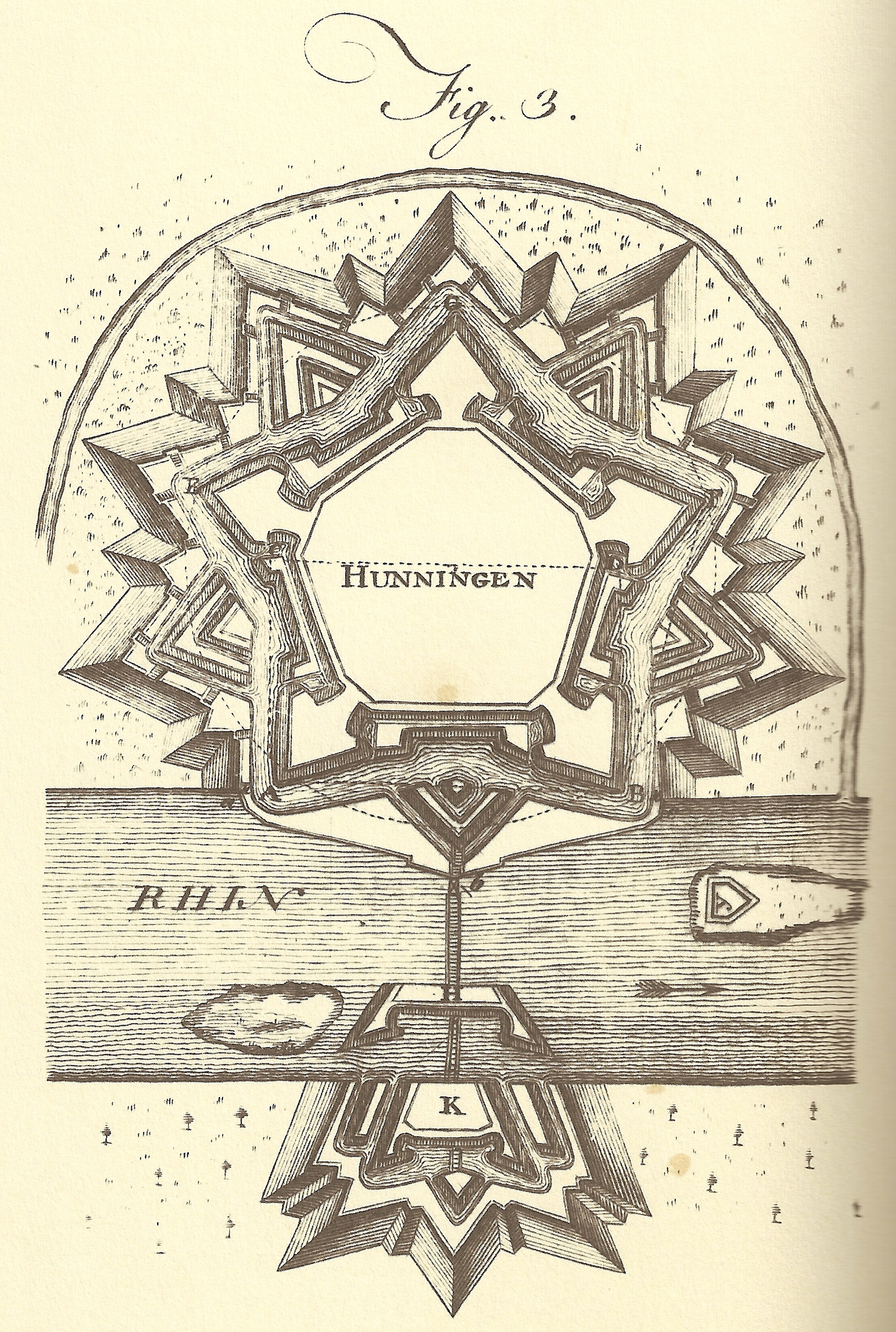
A diagram of Huningue's former fortifications. Built by Vauban (1679–1681) with a bridge and bridgehead across the Rhine. It was demolished under the terms of Article III of the Treaty of Paris (1815).

Bridgehead (French tête de pont) is a High Middle Ages military term, which before the invention of cannons meant the military fortification that protects the end of a bridge. Like many older terms, the meaning of the word drifted with the passage of time, becoming used for something not exactly true to its initial usage.

With the introduction of cannons, the term was morphed to a generalized term for field fortifications lying some distance beyond the ends of the bridge that were emplaced to protect both the bridge and any troops crossing it to the far bank. This term was used in that era when referring to both the fortifications and the small lodgement on the bank which was closest to the enemy. As the process of moving an army over bridges is slow and complicated, it is usually necessary to secure it from hostile interruption, and the works constituting the bridgehead must therefore be sufficiently advanced to keep the enemy's artillery out of range of the bridges. As artillery grew in power, so did the size of the lodgements necessary. In addition, room is required for the troops to form up on the further bank. Formerly, with short-range weapons, a bridgehead was often little more than a screen for the bridge itself, but modern conditions have rendered necessary far greater extensions of bridge defenses.

When armies and military formations grew, more lodgement area was required to organize a force large enough to stage a break out against a determined enemy. The technical meaning of the term expanded once again, referring to a large fortified area about at bridge end. With the advent of modern warfare capabilities, including long-range tube artillery and high-powered rifles with effective ranges measured in the thousands of yards (metres), the term of art again had to expand in area, but now morphed to be just an area defended and controlled by ample firepower, with or without constructed fortifications.

The term in colloquial usage refers to any kind of defended area that is extended into hostile territory, also called a foothold and sometimes the technically incorrect 'beachhead', which is frequently mistaken colloquially as synonymous terminology. The technical term refers in particular to the specific area on the far side of a defended river bank or a segment of a lake or riverine coastline held by the enemy forces, like the Bridge at Remagen. The term is especially applied when such a territory is initially seized by an amphibious assault with the tactical intent of establishing a supply line across the geographic barrier feature to allow further operational manoeuvring. In that sense, it has much in common with the popular misconception of a beachhead.

== See also ==
- Airhead (warfare)
- Beachhead
- Lodgement
