= ZIS-5 =

ZiS-5 may refer to:

- F-34 tank gun, used on the T-34 tank
- ZiS-5 (truck), produced at Zavod imeni Stalina; see also ZiS-6
