= PTS (vehicle) =

Soviet tracked amphibious transport

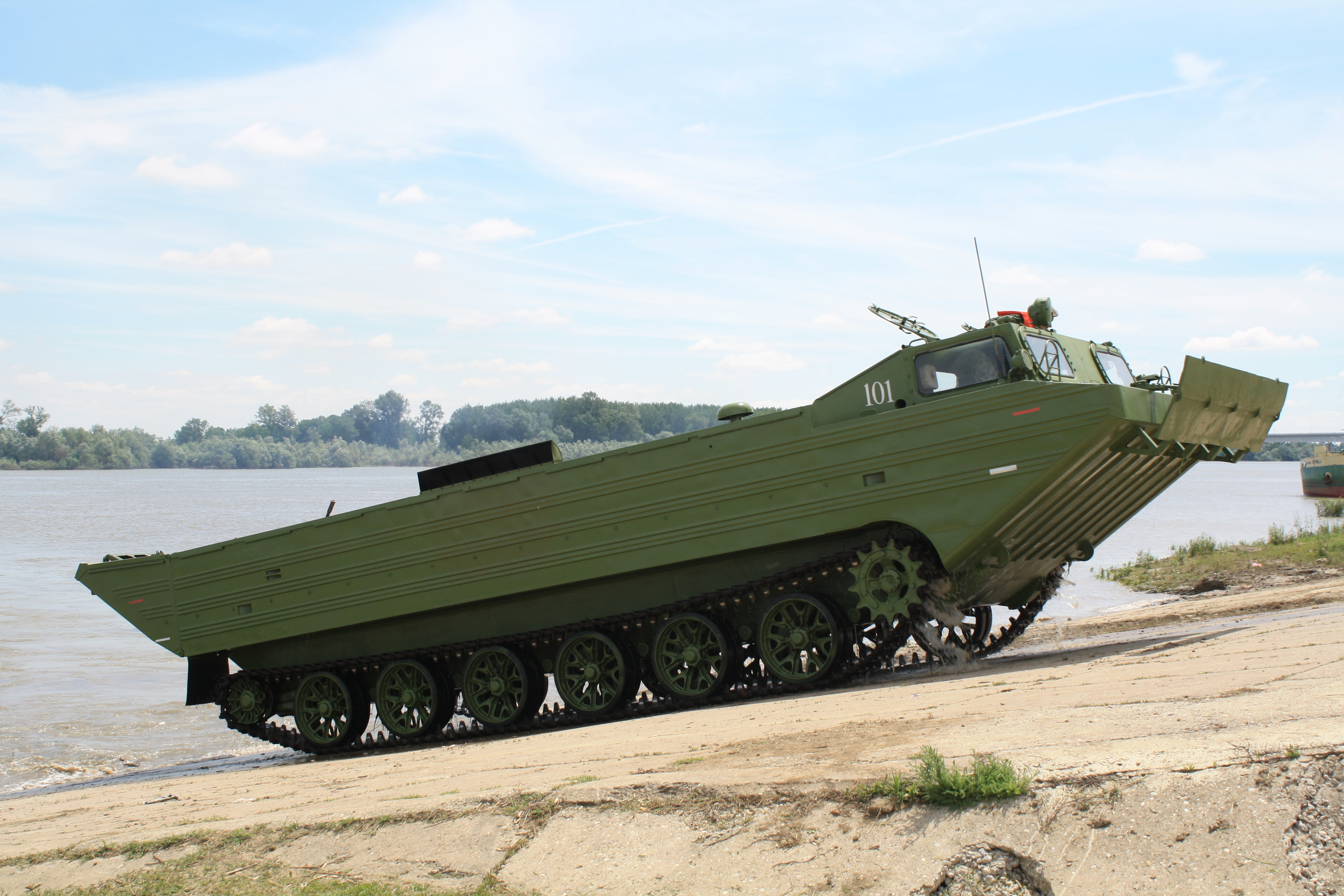
- PTS-M of the Serbian River Flotilla

Service history
- In service: 1965−present
- Used by: See Users
- Wars: Yom Kippur War; Iran-Iraq War; Russo–Ukrainian War

Production history
- Unit cost: US$ 130,000 (PTS-2, 1994 export price)
- Variants: See Variants

Specifications (PTS)
- Mass: 17,700 kg (39,000 lb) (empty)
- Length: 11.5 m (38 ft)
- Width: 3.3 m (11 ft)
- Height: 2.65 m (8 ft 8 in)
- Crew: 1+1
- Passengers: 70 troops
- Engine: V-54P diesel 350 hp (260 kW) at 1,800 rpm
- Payload capacity: 5,000 kg (11,000 lb) (land); 10,000 kg (22,000 lb) (water)
- Suspension: Torsion bar
- Ground clearance: 0.4 m (1 ft 4 in) (loaded)
- Fuel capacity: 705 L (155 imp gal; 186 US gal)
- Operational range: 300 km (190 mi)
- Maximum speed: 42 km/h (26 mph) (land); 10.6 km/h (6.6 mph) (water)

The PTS (Russian: ПТС, Плавающий транспортёр средний, romanized: Plavayushchij Transportyer Sryednyj, lit. 'medium amphibious transport') is a Soviet tracked amphibious transport vehicle. Its industrial index was Ob'yekt 65.

== Development ==
The PTS was introduced in 1965, to replace the earlier K-61 (GPT). Improvements over its predecessor includes a higher water-speed and being capable of carrying 10,000 kg (22,000 lb) on land for 3 km (1.9 mi) before entering the water.

The PTS and PTS-M are both based on the T-55 main battle tank chassis, while the PTS-2 is based on the MT-T tracked transport vehicle, which uses some components of the T-64 MBT. The PTS-2 also uses a V-64-4 diesel engine derived from the T-72 MBT engine. The driving cab of the three models provide the crew with NBC protection.

== Description ==
The PTS has a boxy, open watertight hull, with six road wheels per side, front drive sprocket, rear idler sprocket, and no return rollers. Like the BAV 485, and unlike the DUKW, it has a rear loading ramp. The crew is seated at the front, leaving the rear of the vehicle open for a vehicle, which can be driven (or backed) in, rather than lifted over the side. The engine is under the floor. Propulsion in water is by means of twin propellers, in tunnels to protect them from damage during land operations. Two rudders at the rear of the vehicle provide steering on water. The crew enter the cab via two circular hatches on the roof. The cargo area can be covered by bows and a tarpaulin cover and was sometimes used as an ambulance.

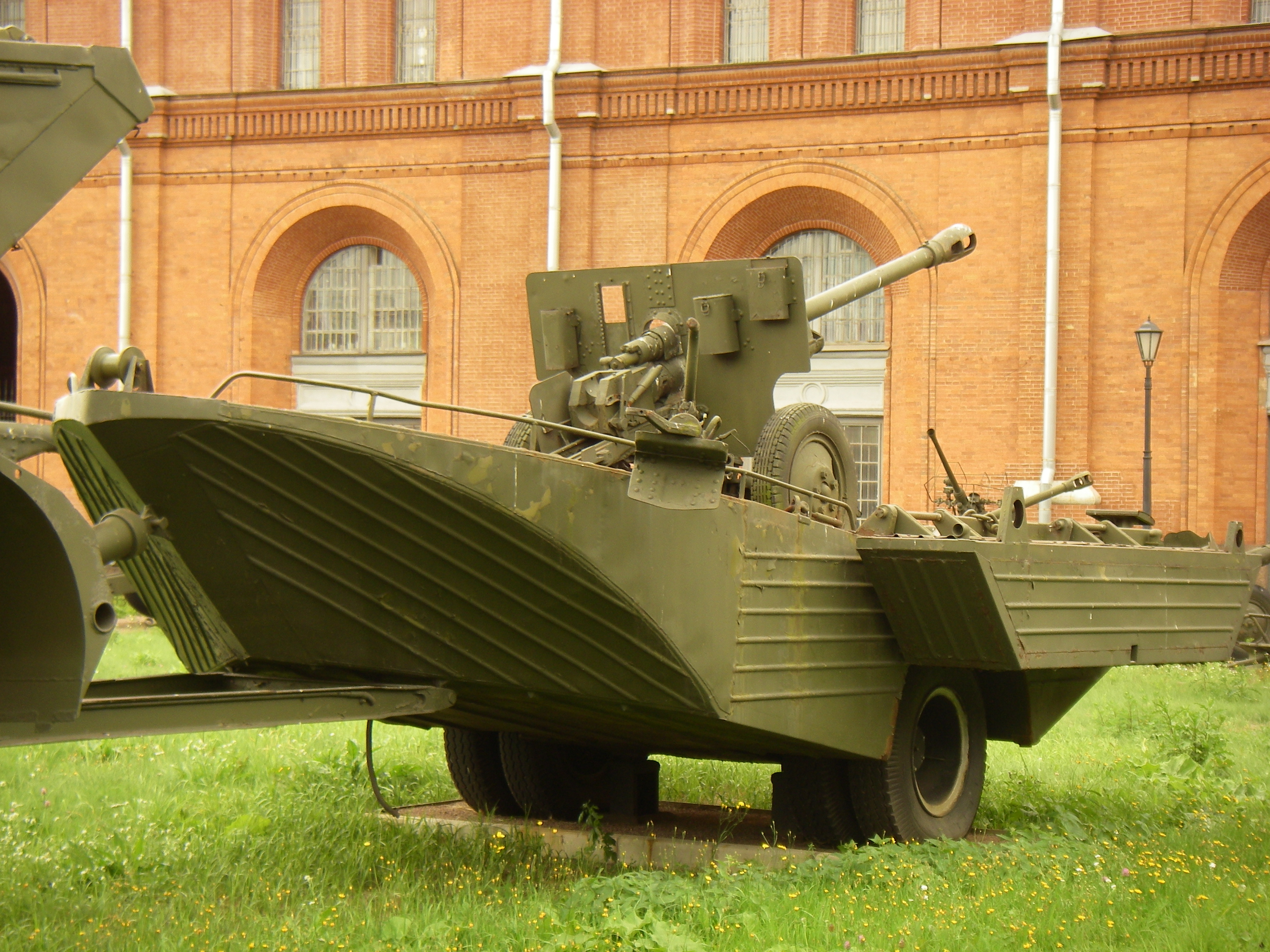
PKP trailer

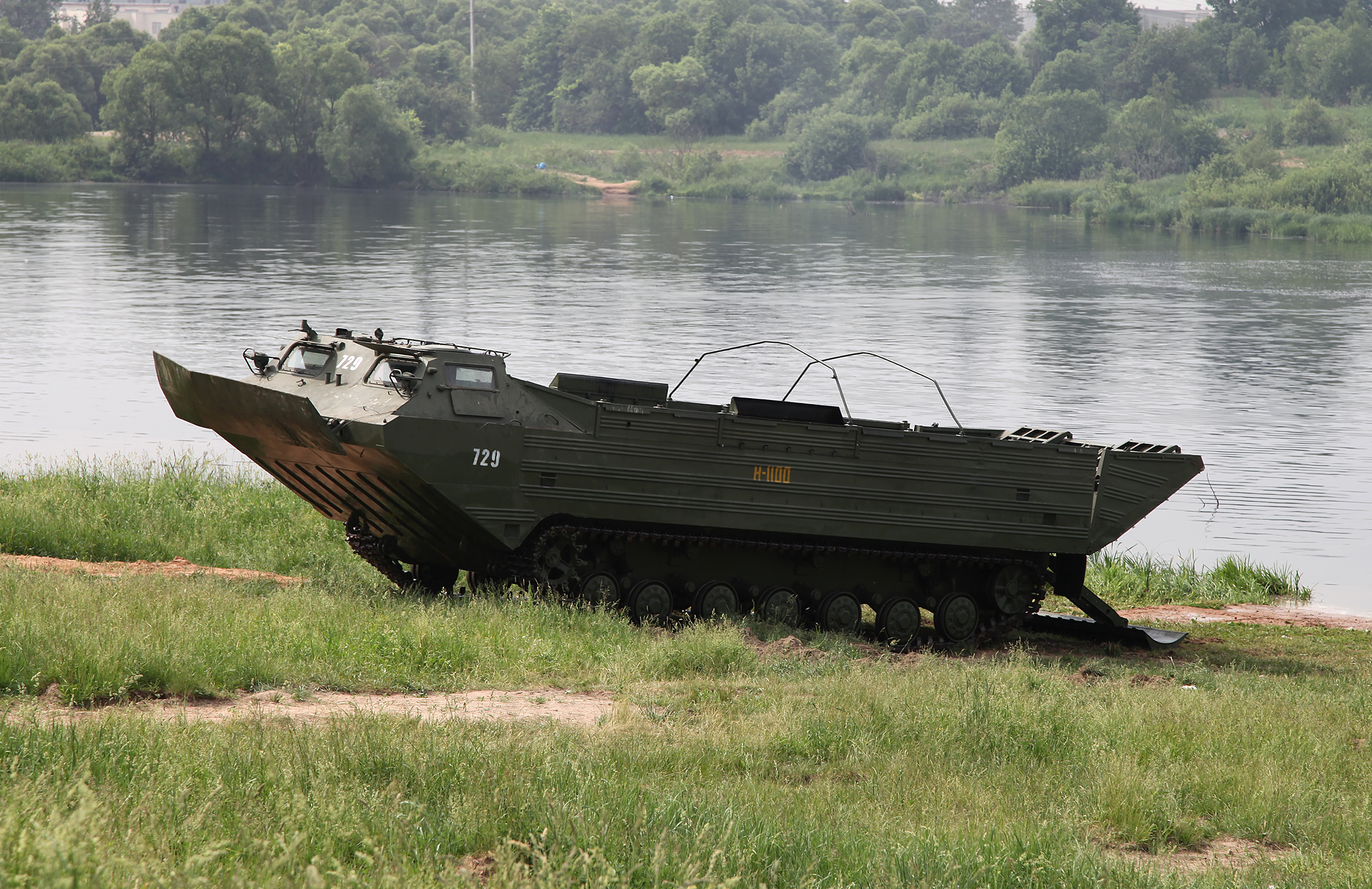
PTS-2

The PTS-M also has a companion vehicle, the PKP, a boat-like amphibious two-wheeled trailer, with fold-out sponsons providing stability on water; the combination allows the PTS-M to accommodate an artillery tractor, field gun (up to medium caliber), its crew, and a quantity of ammunition, all in one load. According to Foss and Gander, a 122 mm (4.8 in) howitzer is carried on the trailer, while the prime mover (such as the Ural-375D truck) is carried on the PTS-M itself.

Standard equipment of the PTS and PTS-M includes infrared night vision equipment, intercom, radios, and a searchlight mounted on the top of the cab. A special kit allows both vehicles to operate in the sea with wave heights up to 1.25 m (4 ft 1 in). While the PTS-2 can be optionally fitted with a multipurpose shovel, dozer blade, water-jet, air conditioning equipment, radio locator, and navigation systems.

== Specifications ==
Comparison of the PTS, PTS-M, and PTS-2
	PTS	PTS-M	PTS-2
year of introduction	1965	1969	1985
length	11.5 m (38 ft)	11.426 m (37.49 ft)	12 m (39 ft)
width	3.3 m (11 ft)	3.3 m (11 ft)	3.3 m (11 ft)
height	2.65 m (8 ft 8 in)	2.65 m (8 ft 8 in)	3.17 m (10.4 ft)
payload capacity	10,000 kg (22,000 lb)	10,000 kg (22,000 lb)	12,000 kg (26,000 lb)
engine	350 hp (260 kW) V-54P diesel	350 hp (260 kW) V-54P diesel	710 hp (530 kW) V-64-4 diesel
max speed (road)	42 km/h (26 mph)	42 km/h (26 mph)	60 km/h (37 mph)
max speed (water)	10.6 km/h (6.6 mph)	10.6 km/h (6.6 mph)	12 km/h (7.5 mph)
road range	300 km (190 mi)	380 km (240 mi)	500 km (310 mi)

== Variants ==
- PTS: Original transporter fielded in 1965 based on an elongated ATS-59 chassis.
- PTS-M: Soviet engine upgrade version from 1969, weighing 36 metric tons, it can carry up to 10,000 kilograms (22,000 lb) or 20-70 soldiers.
- Vollketten Schwimmwagen: PTS-M for the National People's Army.
- PTS-MP: Modernized Polish version.
- PTS-10: Czech designation of PTS-M; can carry 70 passengers.
- PTS-2: Replacement based on new larger chassis, with higher side walls and larger loading platform.
- PTS-3: Upgrade of PTS-2 with higher sides.
- PTS-4: Based on T-80 chassis with improved armor and larger props.
- PLAM: Chinese variant on indigenous chassis with MG turret on the cab.

In 2014, the Russian Defense Ministry intends to purchase an undetermined number of PTS-4s, which underwent acceptance trials in 2011. The vehicle will be fitted with a remotely operated 12.7 mm (0.50 in) machine gun and a multi-fuel engine. The PTS-4 weighs 33 tons, with a payload of 12 tons on land (18 tons on water). Projected maximum road speed is 60 km/h (37 mph), with an expected maximum speed in water of 15 km/h (9.3 mph). Unlike its predecessors, it uses T-80 suspension components. The fully enclosed cab offers protection against small arms fire and splinter. Production began in 2014.

== Users ==
The PTS-M was adopted by the Soviet Army and Warsaw Pact forces, and has been supplied to Egypt, the former Yugoslavia, Iraq, Uruguay, and other nations.

=== Current ===
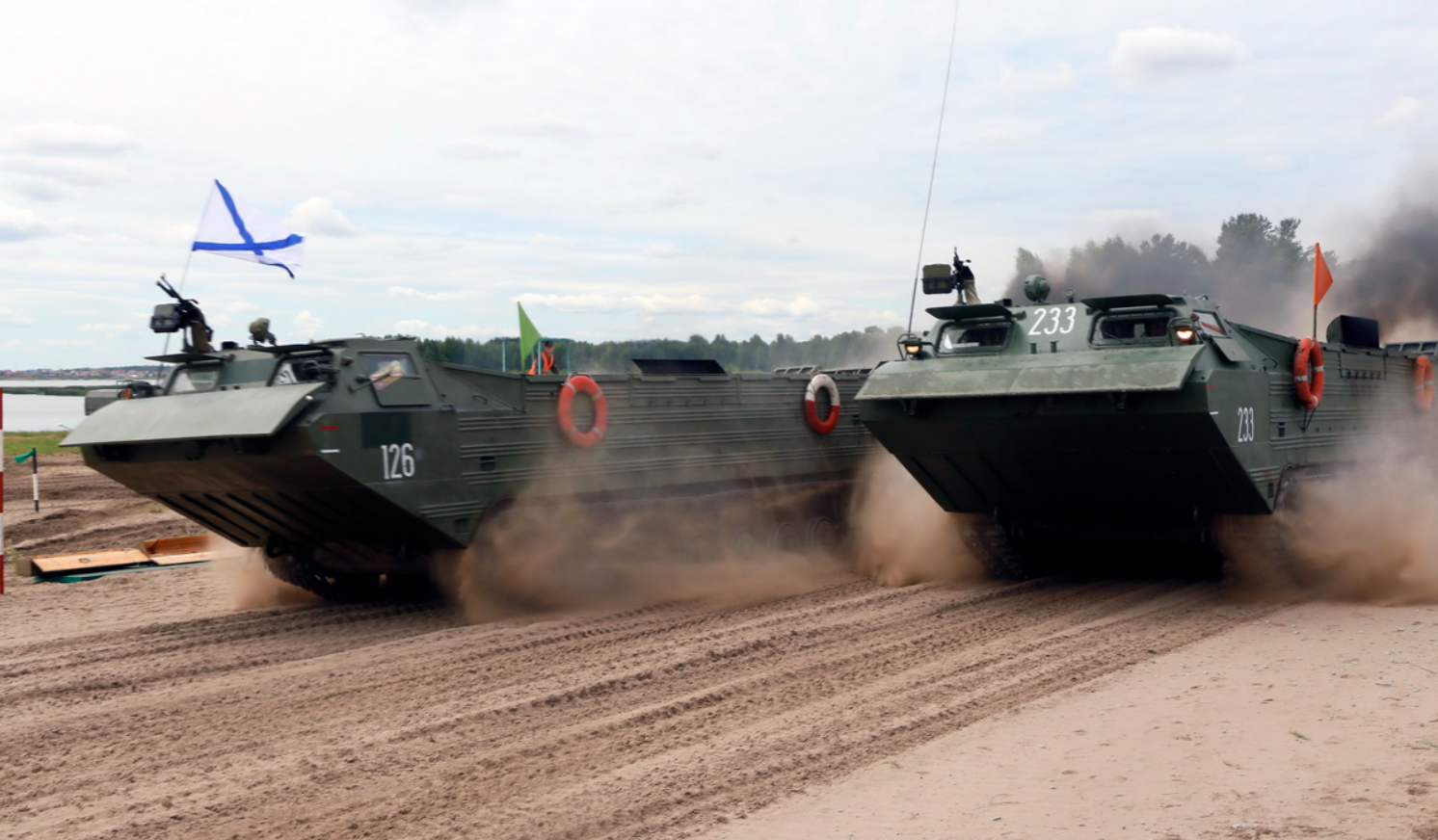
Self-propelled PTS on the march

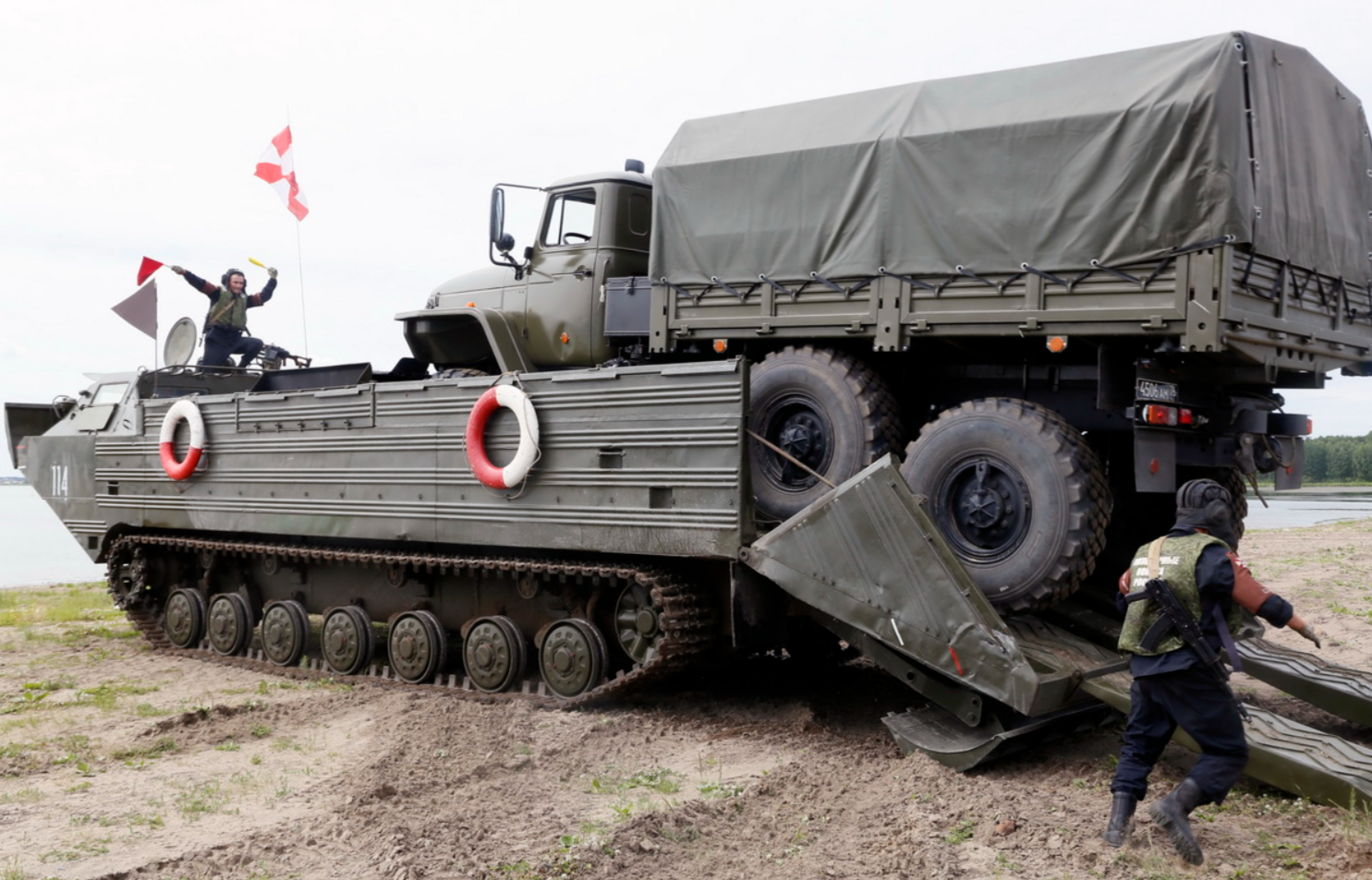
Loading equipment before crossing

- Algeria
- Angola
- Bulgaria
- Congo
- Cuba
- Czech Republic − PTS-10, to be replaced
- Egypt − PTS-M (used during operation Badr)
- Hungary − Used for disaster relief operations
- India
- Iran
- Russia PTS4 OTM UralTM building, PTS 2 PTS3 . PTS1 BTR50 reactivated
- Serbia − PTS-M
- Sudan
- Poland − 282 PTS-M, to be replaced
- Tanzania
- Ukraine
- Uruguay – 2 PTS in service as of 2016
- Vietnam

=== Former ===
- Czechoslovakia
- East Germany
- Iraq
- Libya
- Russian separatist forces in Donbass − PTS-2
- Serbia and Montenegro
- Slovakia
- Soviet Union
- Yemen
- Yugoslavia

== See also ==
- GAZ-46
- Landwasserschlepper
