= ZIS-151 =

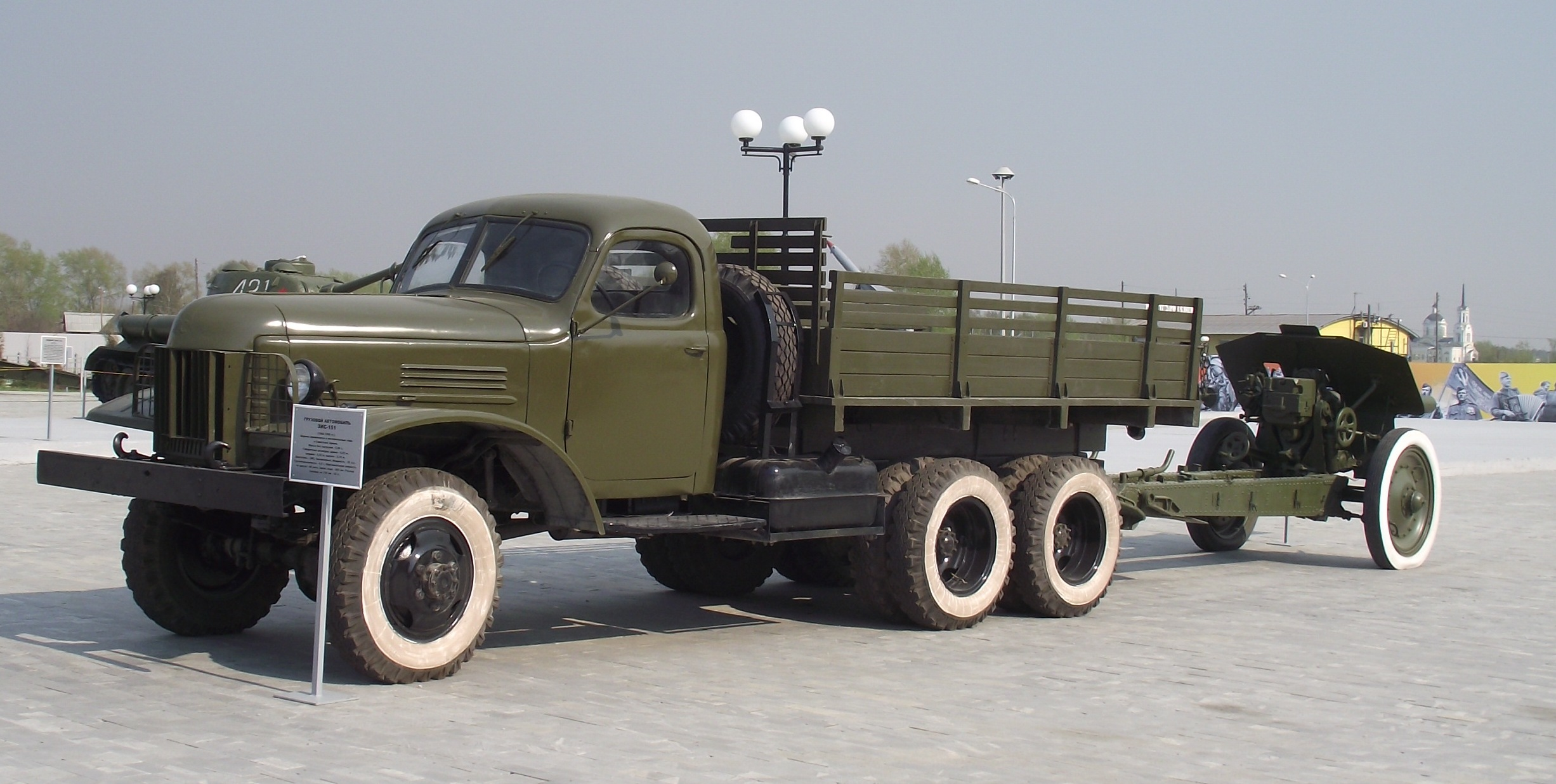

Overview
- Manufacturer: ZIS
- Also called: ZIL-151 (1956–1958)
- Production: 1948–1958
- Assembly: Russia: Moscow

Body and chassis
- Class: Truck
- Layout: front engine, 6×6
- Related: Jiefang CA-30

Powertrain
- Engine: 5.55 L ZIS-121, 92 hp (69 kW)
- Transmission: 5-speed manual with 2 range transfer case

Dimensions
- Wheelbase: 3,665 + 1,120 mm (144.3 + 44.1 in)
- Length: 6.93 m (22 ft 9 in)
- Width: 2.32 m (7 ft 7 in)
- Height: 2.74 m (9 ft 0 in)
- Curb weight: 5,540 kg (12,214 lb)

Chronology
- Predecessor: ZIS-6
- Successor: ZIL-157

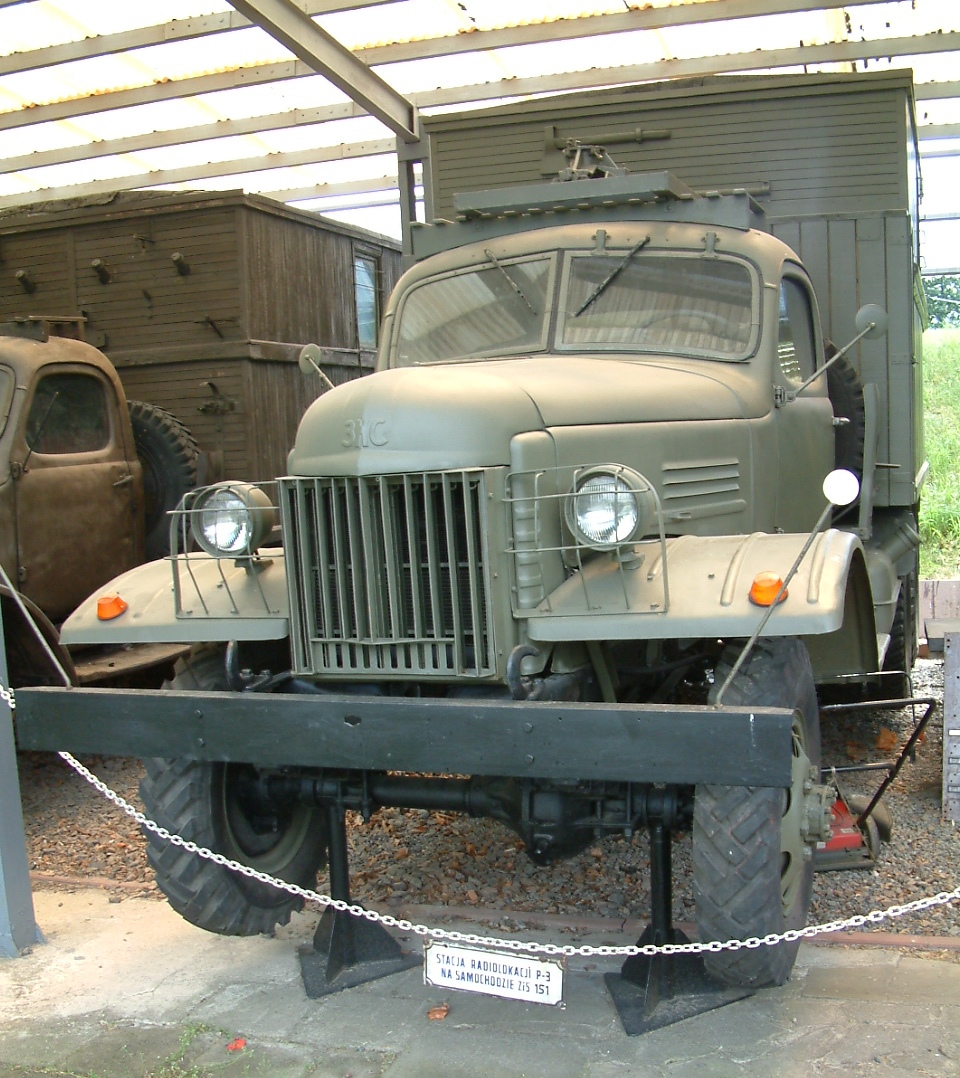
ZIS-151-base with P-3 radio-location station

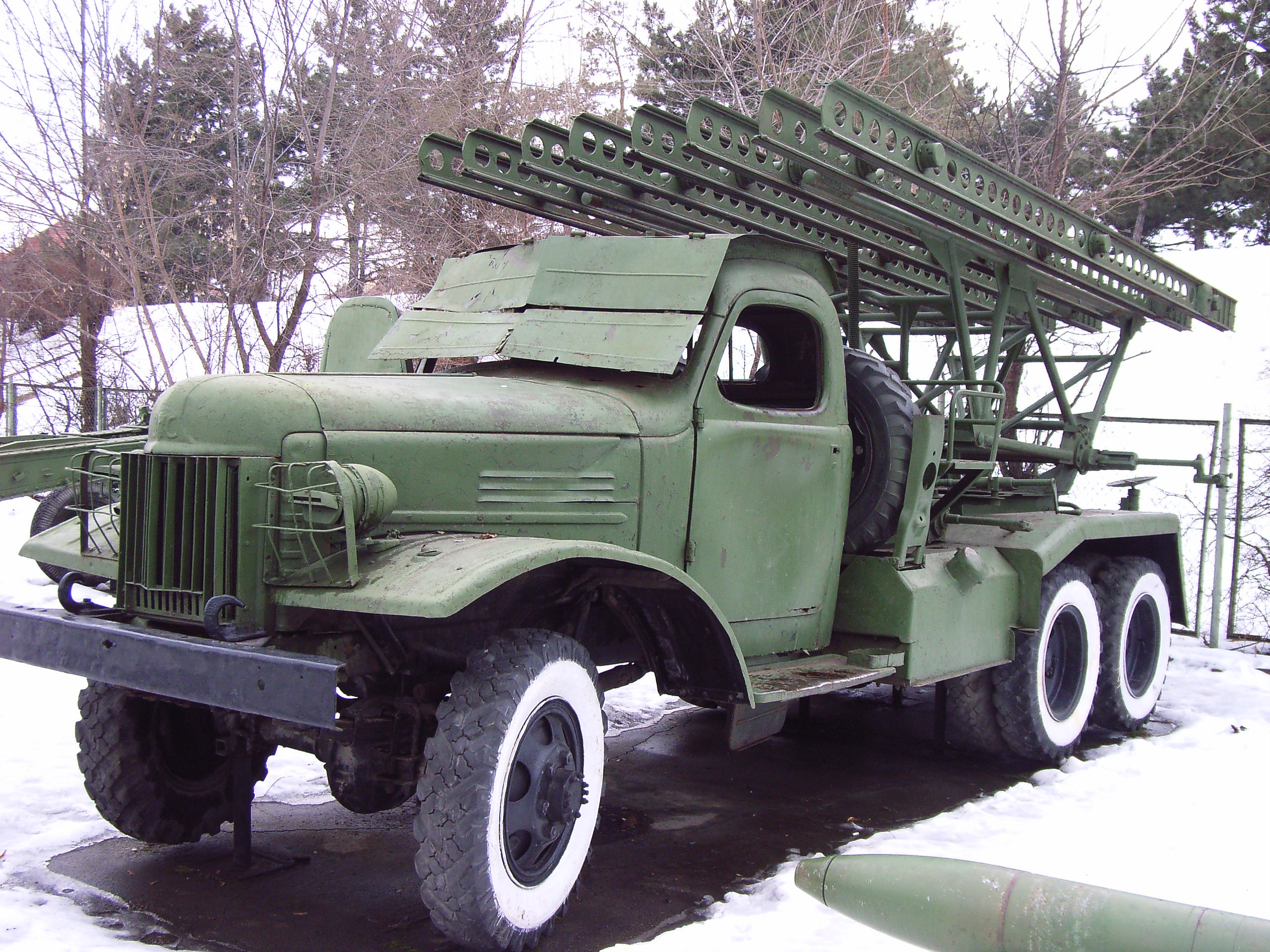
ZIS-151-based BM-13-16 multiple rocket launcher

The ZIS-151 (Russian: ЗИС-151) was a general-purpose truck produced by the Soviet car manufacturer Automotive Factory No. 2 Zavod imeni Stalina for ten years, from 1948 until 1958. In 1956, the factory was renamed to Zavod imeni Likhacheva, and the new trucks were called the ZIL-151 (ЗИЛ-151).

The ZIS-151 was the first major Soviet military all-wheel-drive truck built following World War II, replacing the Lend-Lease U.S. Studebaker US6, GMC CCKW 2½-ton 6×6 truck, and the earlier Soviet ZIS-6, which was in turn a license built version of the Autocar Dispatch SD truck . In early 1948, the cabs were made of wood, soon replaced with a steel cab. Tens of thousands were produced, including specialized versions for hauling different types of cargo. The Soviets also found the trucks an ideal platform for BM-13 Katyusha rocket launchers.

The most famous developments of ZIS-151 were the BTR-152 armoured personnel carrier and the BAV 485 amphibious vehicle. Due to de-Stalinization the ZIS-151 was renamed in 1956 to ZIL-151.

In 1958, an improved model, the ZIL-157, was introduced and replaced the ZIS-151. It differed outwardly by its grille and having single rear tires, instead of the ZIL-151's dual tires.

In 1956, the Chinese began building the ZIS-151 under license as the Jiefang CA-30 at First Automobile Works, with slightly more power and angular front fenders. The improved single tire CA-30, introduced in 1958, remained in production until 1986.

== Engine and driveline ==
The ZIS-151 engine, the 5.55 L (339 cu in) engine, based on the Hercules Engine Company's JXD engine, which was in the Studebaker US6. The Soviet built L-head inline 6 cylinder gasoline engine developed 92 hp (69 kW) at 2600 rpm.

The transmission was a 5 speed with a direct 4th gear and overdrive 5th. The transfer case had high and low ranges, and selectively engaged the front axle. Both front and rear axles were a split type.

The differential and rear axle housing were the same as the GAZ-51, and the front axle was similar to, and used parts from, the GAZ-63.

== Chassis ==
The chassis was 6×6, with three live beam axles, adapted and strengthened for conditions in the USSR. It had a reinforced ladder frame with three live beam axles, the front on semi elliptical leaf springs, the rear tandem on quarter elliptical leaf springs with locating arms.

Wheelbase was 4,225 mm (166 in) to the center of the rear bogey and 4,785 mm (188 in) to the center of the rear axle.

ZIS-151’s tires have a larger cross section, 8.25 in × 20 in (21 cm × 51 cm) versus the US6’s 7.50 in × 20 in (19 cm × 51 cm). Both had dual rear tires. The wider tires spread the load over a wider area. This allows the truck to be operated on softer surfaces.

The ZIL-157 has much wider 12.00 in × 18 in (30 cm × 46 cm) single rear tires. To further increase the footprint, a centralized inflation system allows the tire pressure to be reduced from the cab for soft surfaces, then re-inflated for road use.

The drive shafts were laid out like the US6, but as a mirror image, the front axle differential was offset to the left, while American trucks were offset to the right. Air brakes were used, on the ZIL-157 the air system also supplied the centralized inflation system.

== Specifications ==
- 6×6 4,500 kg (9,921 lb) ZIS-150 based truck
- Engine: ZIS-121 6-cyl, 92 hp (69 kW) at 2600 rpm, 5.555 L (339 cu in)
- Bore/stroke: 101.6 mm (4.00 in) × 114.3 mm (4.50 in)
- Compression ratio: 6.0
- Clutch: dry twin plate
- Gearbox: 5×2 speeds
- Length: 6.93 m (22 ft 9 in)
- Width: 2.32 m (7 ft 7 in)
- Height: 2.31 m (7 ft 7 in)
- Wheelbase: 4,225 mm (166.3 in), rear axis clearance: 260 mm (10 in)
- Front wheel track: 1,590 mm (63 in)
- Rear track: 1,720 mm (68 in)
- Turning radius on front outer wheel: 11.2 metres (36 ft 9 in)
- Weight (without load): 5,580 kg (12,302 lb)
- Maximal speed (loaded, highway): 60 km/h (37 mph)
- Tyres: 8.25 in × 20 in (21 cm × 51 cm)
- Fuel tank capacity: 2× 150 L (39.6 US gal; 33.0 imp gal)
- Fuel consumption: 42 L/100 km (6.7 mpg_{‑imp}; 5.6 mpg_{‑US})

== Variants ==
- ZIS-151: Original production version. Produced 1947-1958.
  - ZIS-151D: As ZIS-151 except with shielded electrical equipment. Produced 1955-1958.
  - ZIS-151E: Export version of ZIS-151. Produced 1949-1958.
  - ZIS-151P: Cab-chassis version (for PMZM-3 fire truck). Produced 1951-1956.
  - ZIS-151U: Export version of ZIS-151 for tropical climates. Produced 1956-1958.
- ZIS-121B: Tractor-trailer version. Produced 1954-1958.
- ZIS-121D: As ZIS-121B, except powered by a ZIS-121D engine. Produced 1955-1958.
- ZIS-151A (ZIS-121G): Prototype modernized version of ZIS-151. Produced in 1953; entered production as the ZIL-157.
- ZIS-151B: Prototype version with single rear wheels and a new frame designed by NAMI. Produced in 1955.
- ZIS-151G (ZIL-E157): Prototype for ZIL-157.
- ZIS-151V (ZIL-157A): Prototype modernized version of the ZIS-151. Produced in 1955.
- ZIS-121V: Prototype for BTR-152.
- ZIS-153: Prototype halftrack version. Produced in 1952.
- BTR-152: Armoured personnel carrier.
- BAV 485: Amphibious military version.

== Operators ==
- North Korea
