= BAV 485 =

Soviet amphibious transport vehicle

BAV-A/ZIL-485A
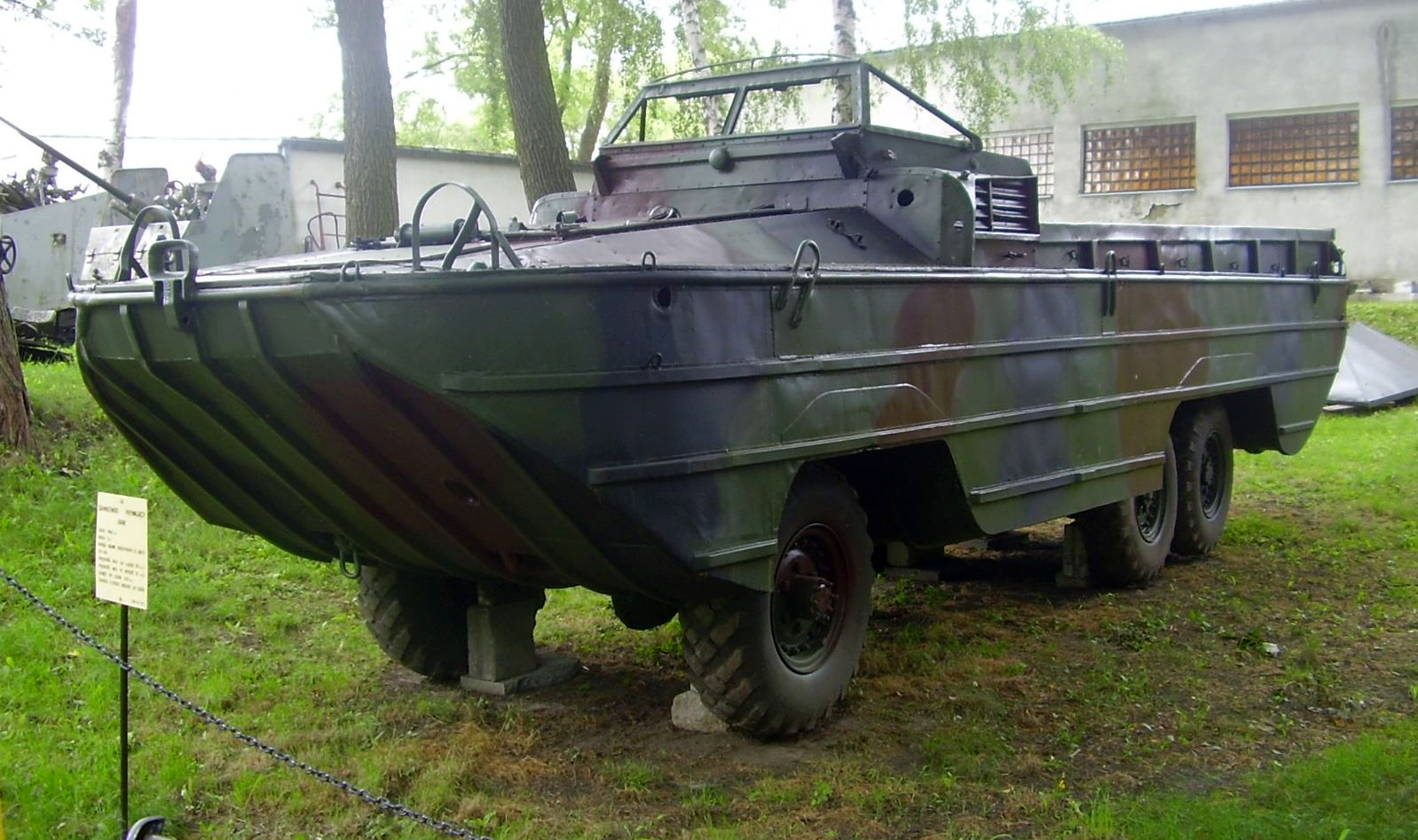
- A ZIS-485 at the Lubuskie Muzeum Wojskowe (Lubuskie Military Museum), Drzonów, Poland

Overview
- Manufacturer: Automotive Factory No. 2 Zavod imeni Likhacheva (Likachev Motor Factory)
- Also called: ZIS-485 (1952–1957); ZIL-485A (after 1958); BAV-A (army designation)
- Production: 1952–1962
- Assembly: Moscow, Soviet Union

Body and chassis
- Class: 6x6 amphibious transport
- Body style: waterproofed hull
- Layout: Front engine, six-wheel-drive
- Platform: ZIS-151; ZIL-157 (from 1958)
- Related: ZIS-151, ZIL-157, BTR-152

Powertrain
- Engine: 5.6L ZIS-123 I6
- Transmission: 5-speed manual (road); PTO propeller drive (water)

Dimensions
- Wheelbase: 4,225 mm (166.3 in)
- Length: 8.6 m (28 ft)(before modernization) 9.54 m (31.3 ft)(after modernization)
- Width: 2.07 m (6.8 ft)(beam, before modernization) 2.8 m (9.2 ft)(after modernization)
- Height: 2.64 m to 2.66 m (8.7 ft) (with top-mounted)
- Curb weight: 7,150 kg (15,760 lb)

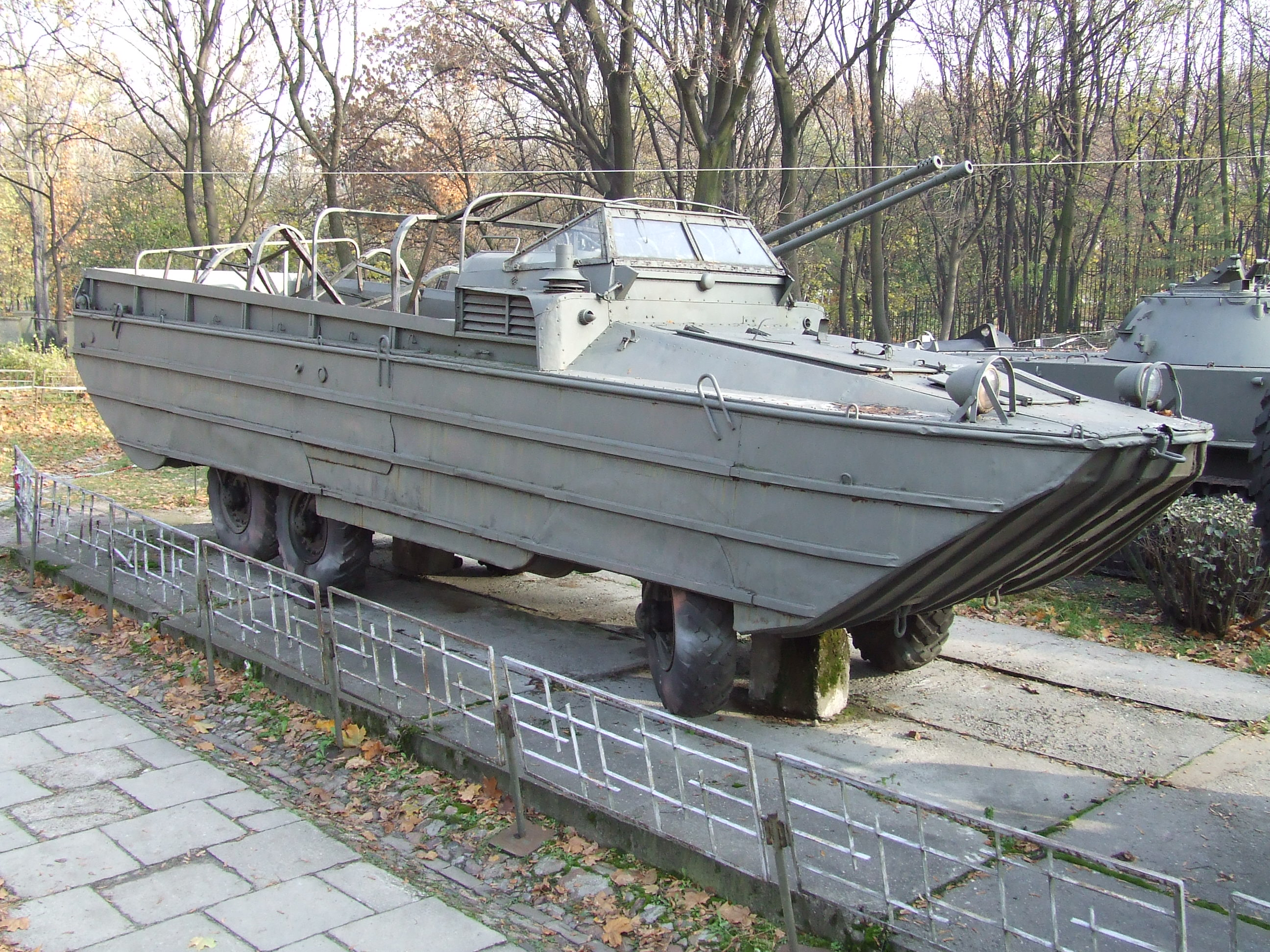
ZIS-485 (BAV), Muzeum Wojska Polskiego, Warszawa

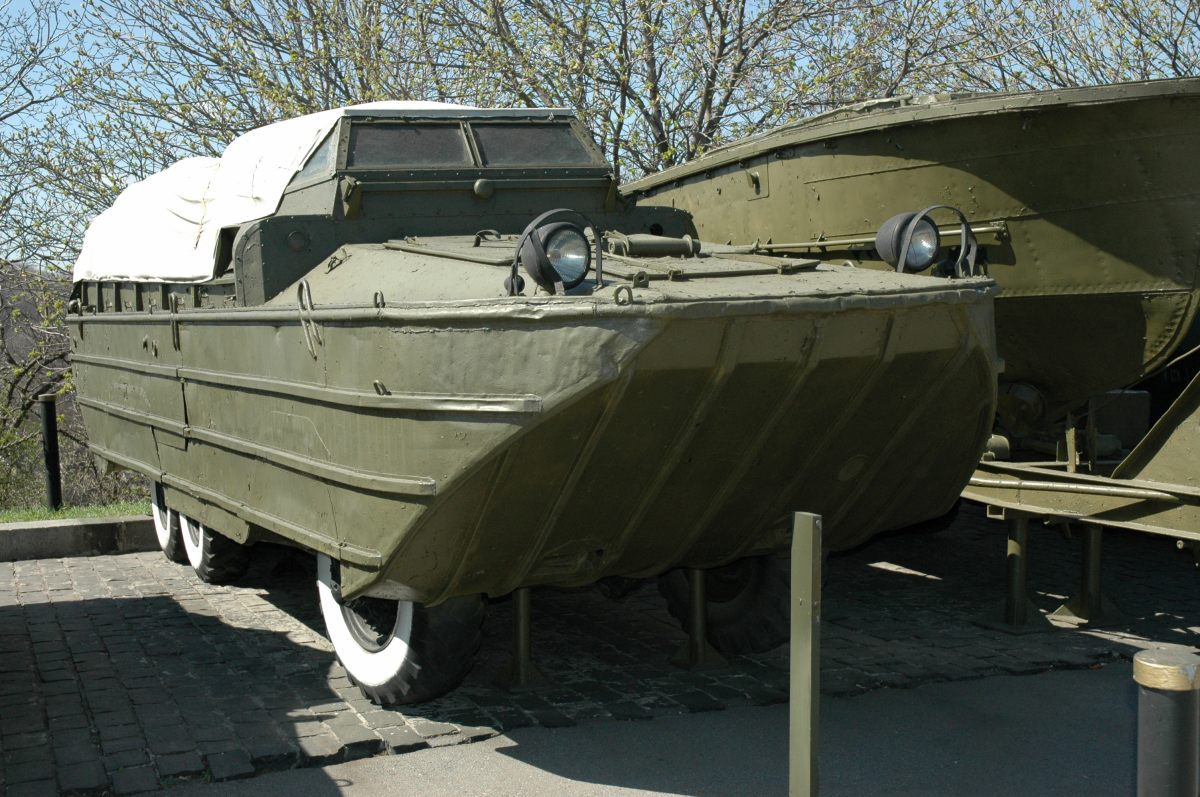
ZIS-485 (BAV) Soviet amphibious truck (National Museum of the History of Ukraine in the Second World War, Kyiv)

The ZIS-485, army designation BAV (Russian, БАВ, большой автомобиль водоплавающий - bolshoi avtomobil vodoplavayushchiy, big floating vehicle), is a Soviet amphibious transport, a copy of the WWII American DUKW.

During World War II, the Soviets received 586 DUKW-353 amphibious trucks under the Lend-Lease Act. The design was regarded as successful, so it was decided to build a similar domestic vehicle. Due to lack of own experience, the DUKW was copied, although with improvements enhancing its capability. The prototype was built in 1949 in ZIS subsidiary DAZ in Dnepropetrovsk, but a production started at ZIS factory, as ZIS-485. Introduced in 1952, it was intended to complement the GAZ-46 4x4 amphibious reconnaissance vehicle, but using the ZIS-151 6x6 truck (also used in the BTR-152) as its basis. Similar in size to the DUKW, which it resembles, the BAV has a rear tail gate making loading and unloading easier, rather than all cargo being loaded over the side by crane. Also a platform was enlarged by 1/3, to 10.44 m^{2}.

Initially based on ZIS-151 truck, after the introduction of the improved ZIL-157 the vehicle was modernized using its components now bearing the designation ZIL-485A (army designation was BAV-A). Its production started in 1958, but it ceased in ZIL factory in 1959, after manufacturing 2005 ZIS/ZIL-485. It was planned to move the production to BAZ works in Bryansk, but only 24 vehicles were completed there by 1962.

The cargo body is open, but a canvas cover is available.

Propulsion in water is by means of propeller.

BAVs were used in service by Warsaw Pact Armies and in the Middle East up to the 1980s.

In use by the Soviet Union and its allies and client states the BAV was gradually replaced by the much larger tracked PTS amphibious vehicles.

== Specification ==
- Rear axle clearance:
- Ground clearance:
- Front track: 1,590 mm (62.6 in)
- Rear track: 1,720 mm (67.7 in)
- Turning radius: 11.2 metres (36.7 ft)
- Maximum speed (loaded, highway): 60 km/h (37 mph)
- Tyres: 8¼x20 in (21x102 cm)
- Fuel tank capacity: 2x 150 litres (39.6 US gal; 33.0 imp gal)
- Fuel consumption: 6.7 mpg
- Top speed: 60 km/h (37 mph) (road)
  10 km/h (6.2 mph) (water)
- Range: 480 km (298 mi)

== See also ==
- Landwasserschlepper

== Sources ==
- Fitzsimons, Bernard, ed. The Illustrated Encyclopedia of 20th Century Weapons & Warfare (London: Phoebus, 1978), Volume 5, p. 476-7, "BTR".
- Hogg, Ian V., and Weeks, John. The Illustrated Encyclopedia of Military Vehicles. London: Hamblyn Publishing Group Limited, 1980, p. 308-9, "BAV-485".
- Prochko, Yevgeniy. «Bolshoi avtomobil vodoplavayushchiy». „Tekhnika i Vooruzheniye”. 03/2009. p. 15-22 (in Russian).
- Prochko, Yevgeniy. «Bolshoi avtomobil vodoplavayushchiy». „Tekhnika i Vooruzheniye”. 04/2009. p. 16-22 (in Russian).
- AMW - Agencja Mienia Wojskowego
- ZIS-485 at denisovets.narod.ru
