= Katyusha rocket launcher =

Soviet/Russian multiple launch rocket system

Katyusha
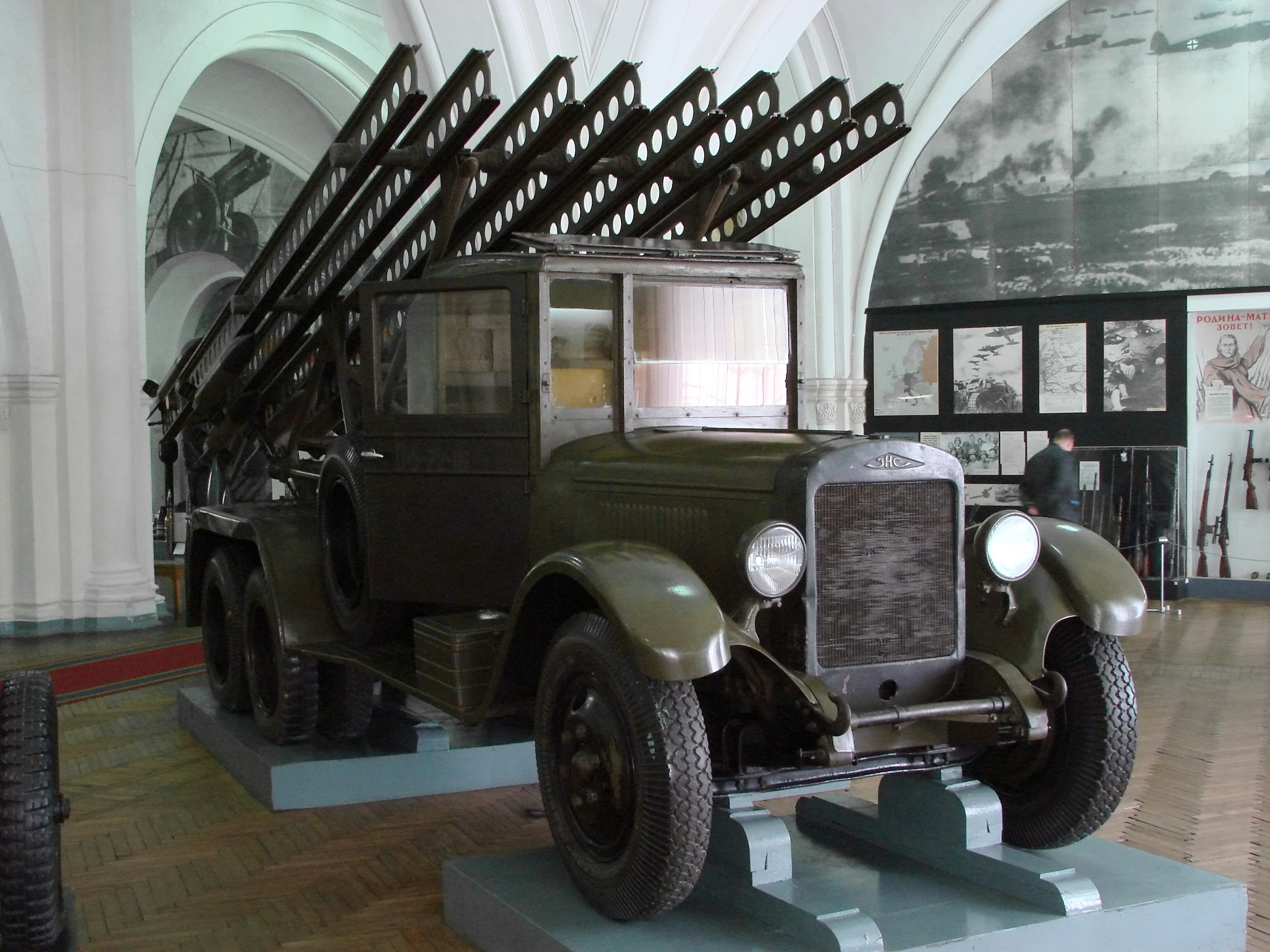
- BM-13 Katyusha multiple rocket launcher, based on a ZIS-6 truck.
- Type: Multiple rocket launcher
- Place of origin: Soviet Union

Service history
- In service: 1941–1970s
- Used by: Soviet Union, and others
- Wars: World War II; First Indochina War; Korean War; Vietnam War; Cambodian Civil War; Cambodian–Vietnamese War

Production history
- Designer: Georgy Langemak
- Manufacturer: Voronezh Plant Comintern
- Produced: 1941
- No. built: ~100,000

The Katyusha (Russian: Катю́ша Russian pronunciation: [kɐˈtʲuʂə]) is a type of rocket artillery first built and fielded by the Soviet Union in World War II. Multiple rocket launchers such as these deliver explosives to a target area more intensively than conventional artillery, but with lower accuracy and requiring a longer time to reload. They are fragile compared to artillery guns, but are cheap, easy to produce, and usable on almost any chassis. The Katyushas of World War II, the first self-propelled artillery mass-produced by the Soviet Union, were usually mounted on ordinary trucks. This mobility gave the Katyusha, and other self-propelled artillery, another advantage: being able to deliver a large blow all at once, and then move before being located and attacked with counter-battery fire.

Having been designed in 1940, katyusha weapons of World War II included the BM-13 launcher, light BM-8, and heavy BM-31. Today, the nickname Katyusha is also applied to newer truck-mounted post-Soviet – in addition to non-Soviet – multiple-rocket launchers, notably the common BM-21 Grad and its derivatives.

== Nickname ==
Initially, concerns for secrecy kept the military designation of the Katyushas from being known by the soldiers who operated them. They were called by code names such as Kostikov guns, after A. Kostikov, the head of the RNII, the Reactive Scientific Research Institute, and finally classed as Guards Mortars. The name BM-13 was only allowed into secret documents in 1942, and remained classified until after the war.

Because they were marked with the letter K (for Voronezh Komintern Factory), Red Army troops adopted a nickname from Mikhail Isakovsky's popular wartime song, "Katyusha", about a woman longing for her absent beloved, who has gone away on military service. Katyusha is the Russian equivalent of Katie, an endearing diminutive form of the name Katherine. Yekaterina is given the diminutive Katya, which itself is then given the affectionate diminutive Katyusha.

German troops coined the nickname "Stalin's organ" (Stalinorgel), after Soviet leader Joseph Stalin, comparing the visual resemblance of the launch array to a pipe organ, and the sound of the weapon's rocket motors, a distinctive howling sound which terrified the German troops, adding a psychological warfare aspect to their use. Weapons of this type are known by the same name in Denmark (Danish: Stalinorgel), Finland (Finnish: Stalinin urut), France (French: orgue de Staline), Norway (Norwegian: Stalinorgel), the Netherlands and Belgium (Dutch: Stalinorgel), Hungary (Hungarian: Sztálin-orgona), Spain and other Spanish-speaking countries (Spanish: Órganos de Stalin) as well as in Sweden (Swedish: Stalinorgel).

The heavy BM-31 launcher was also referred to as Andryusha (Андрюша, an affectionate diminutive of "Andrew").

== World War II ==
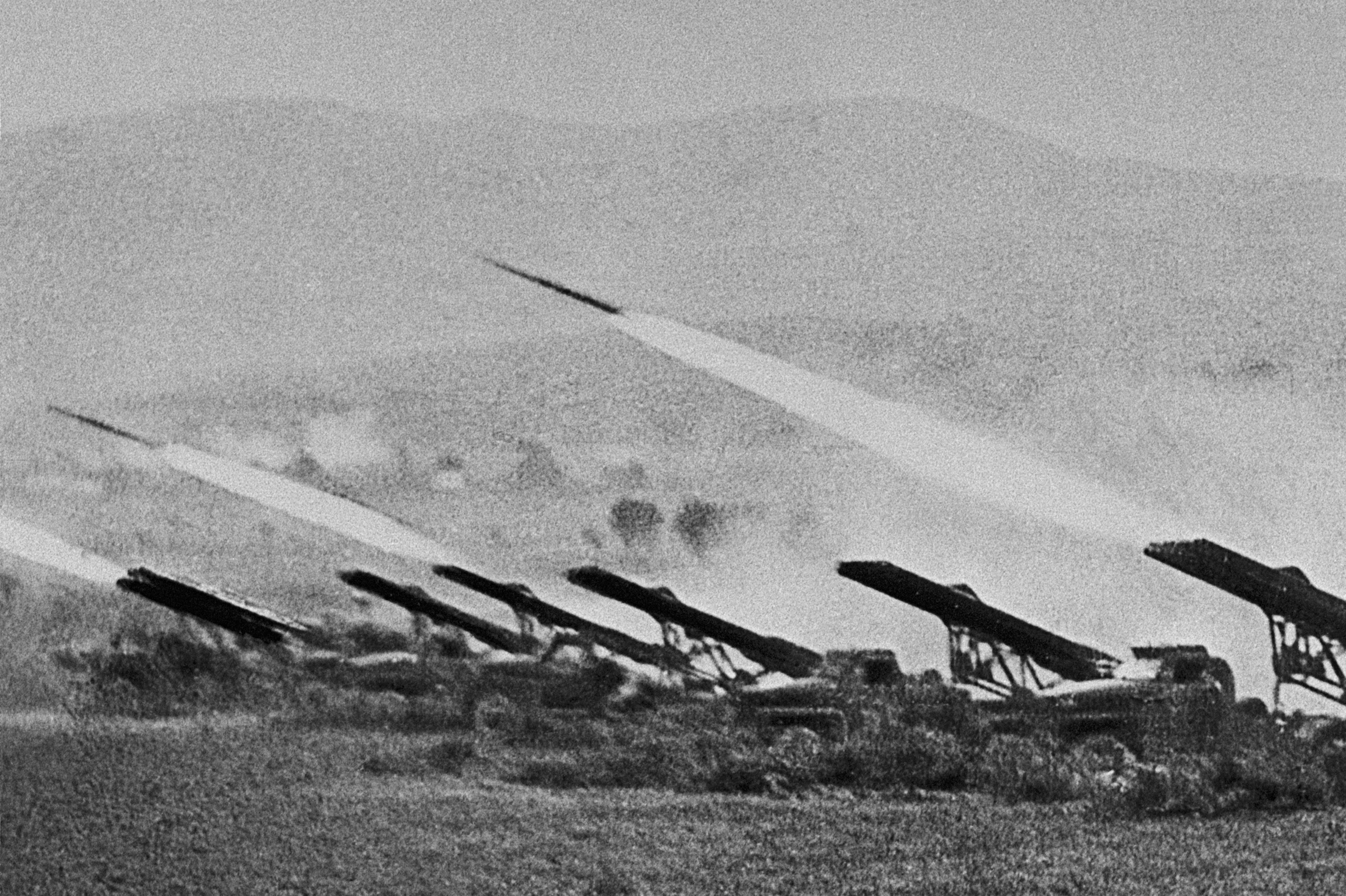
A battery of Katyusha launchers fires at German forces during the Battle of Stalingrad, 6 October 1942

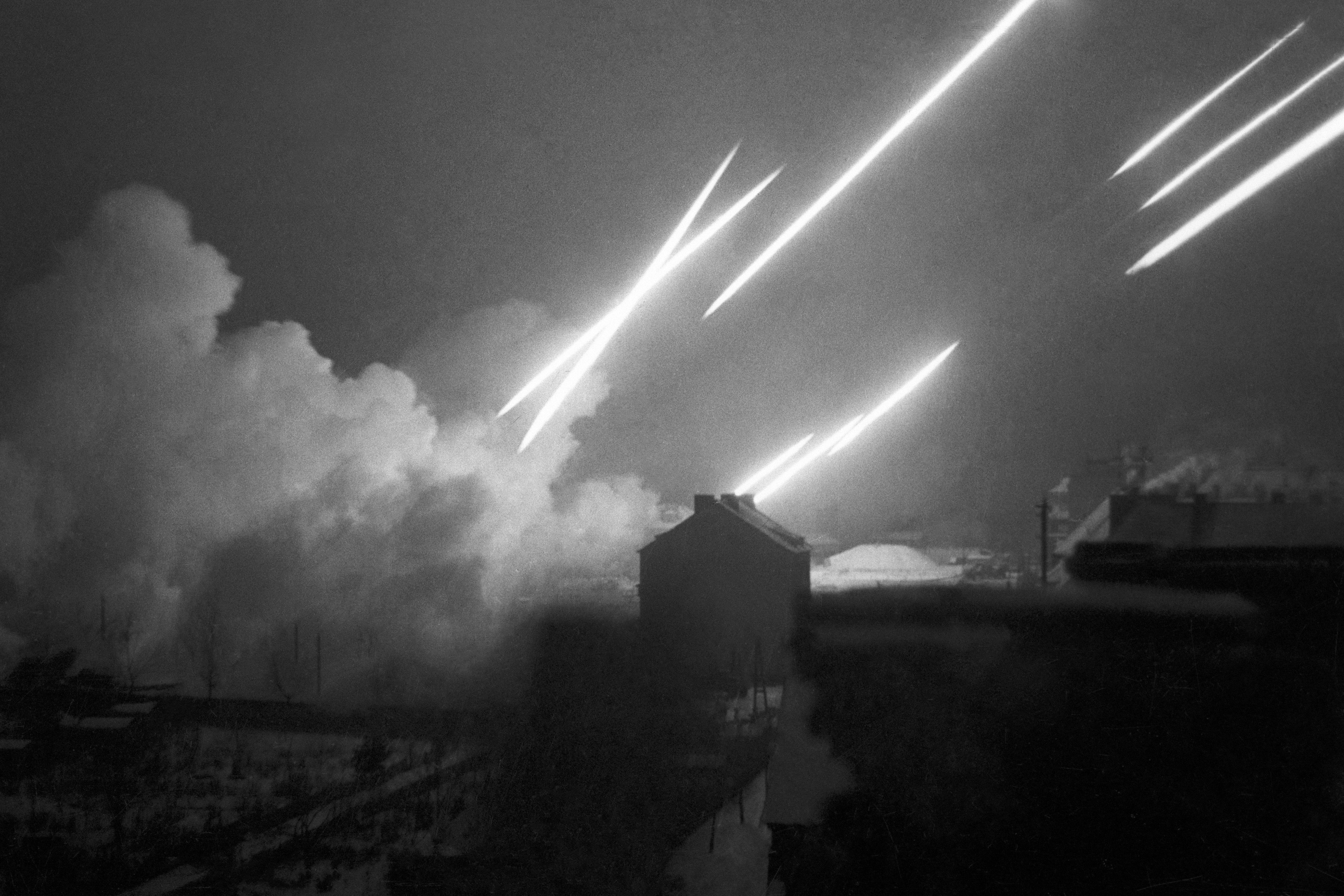
Katyusha salvo during the Vistula–Oder offensive, January 1945

Katyusha rocket launchers, which were built in Voronezh, were mounted on many platforms during World War II, including on trucks, artillery tractors, tanks, and armoured trains, as well as on naval and riverine vessels as assault support weapons. Soviet engineers also mounted single Katyusha rockets on lengths of railway track to serve in urban combat.

The design was relatively simple, consisting of racks of parallel rails on which rockets were mounted, with a folding frame to raise the rails to launch position. Each truck had 14 to 48 launchers. The M-13 rocket of the BM-13 system was 80 cm (2 ft 7 in) long, 13.2 cm (5.2 in) in diameter and weighed 42 kg (93 lb).

The weapon is less accurate than conventional artillery guns, but is extremely effective in saturation bombardment. A battery of four BM-13 launchers could fire a salvo in 7–10 seconds that delivered 1.4 tonnes of high explosives over a 400,000-square-metre (4,300,000 sq ft; 40 ha; 0.40 km^{2}) impact zone,making its salvo roughly equivalent to that of 72 conventional artillery howitzers (18 batteries). With an efficient crew, the launchers could redeploy to a new location immediately after firing, denying the enemy the opportunity for counterbattery fire. Katyusha batteries were often massed in very large numbers to create a shock effect on enemy forces. The weapon's disadvantage was the long time it took to reload a launcher, in contrast to conventional artillery guns which could sustain a continuous, albeit low, rate of fire"The weapon's disadvantage was the long time it took to reload a launcher, in contrast to conventional artillery guns which could sustain a continuous, albeit low, rate of fire" is very similar to part of development section "the artillery branch was not fond of the Katyusha, because it took up to 50 minutes to load and fire 24 rounds, while a conventional howitzer could fire 95 to 150 rounds in the same time.".

=== Development ===
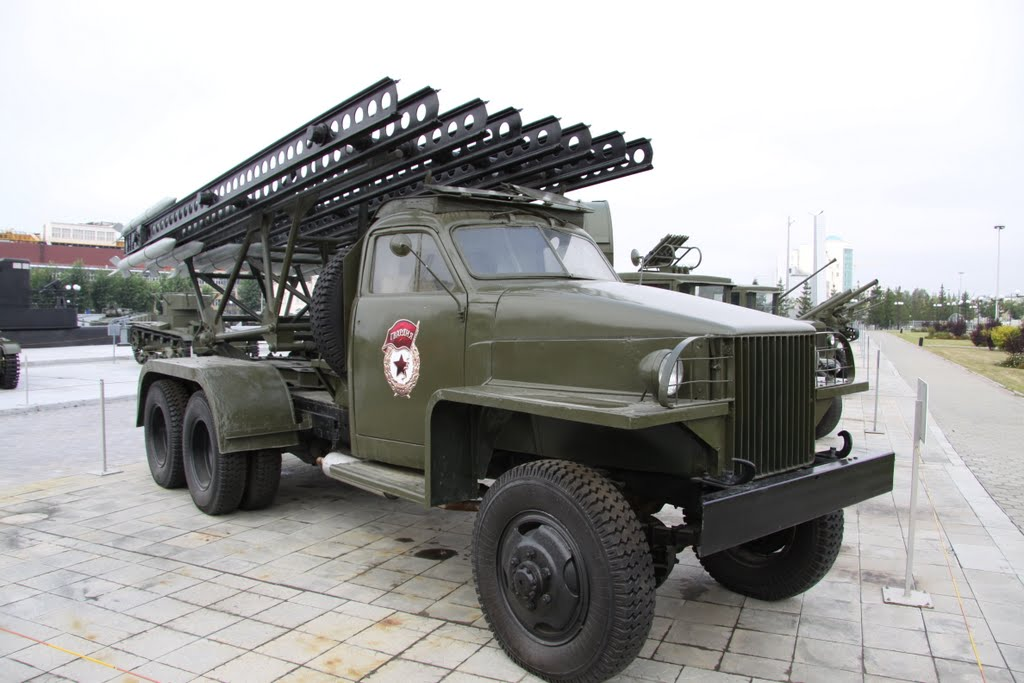
BM-13N Katyusha on a Lend-Lease Studebaker US6 2 1/2-ton 6×6 truck, at the UMMC Museum Complex, Verkhnyaya Pyshma

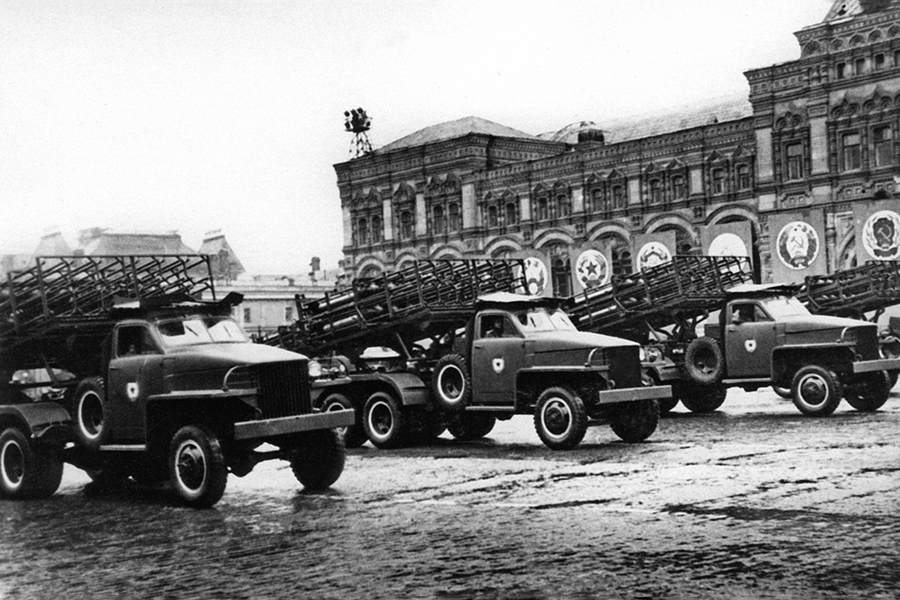
BM-31-12 on a Studebaker US6 truck

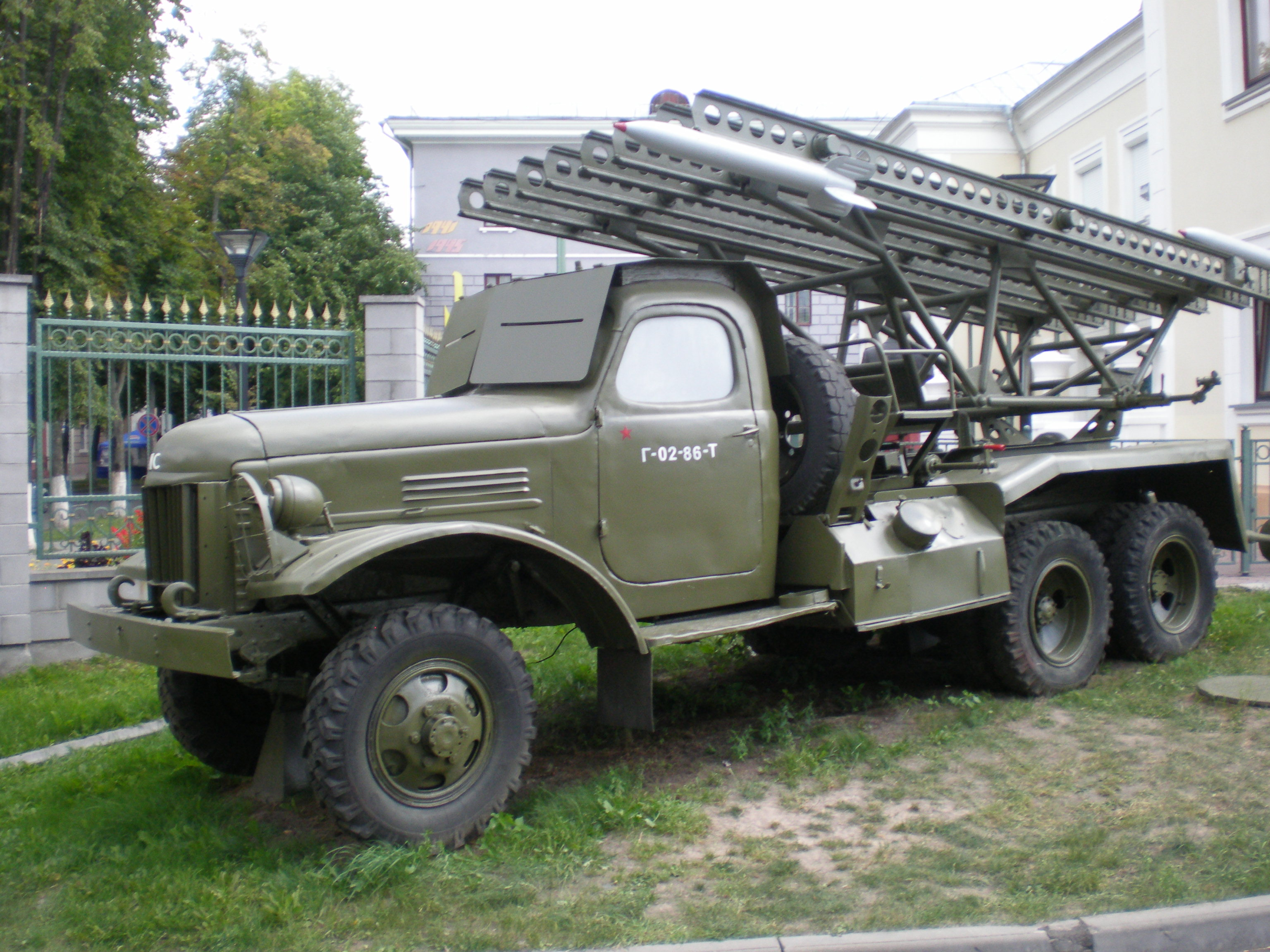
Katyusha on a ZIS-151 truck

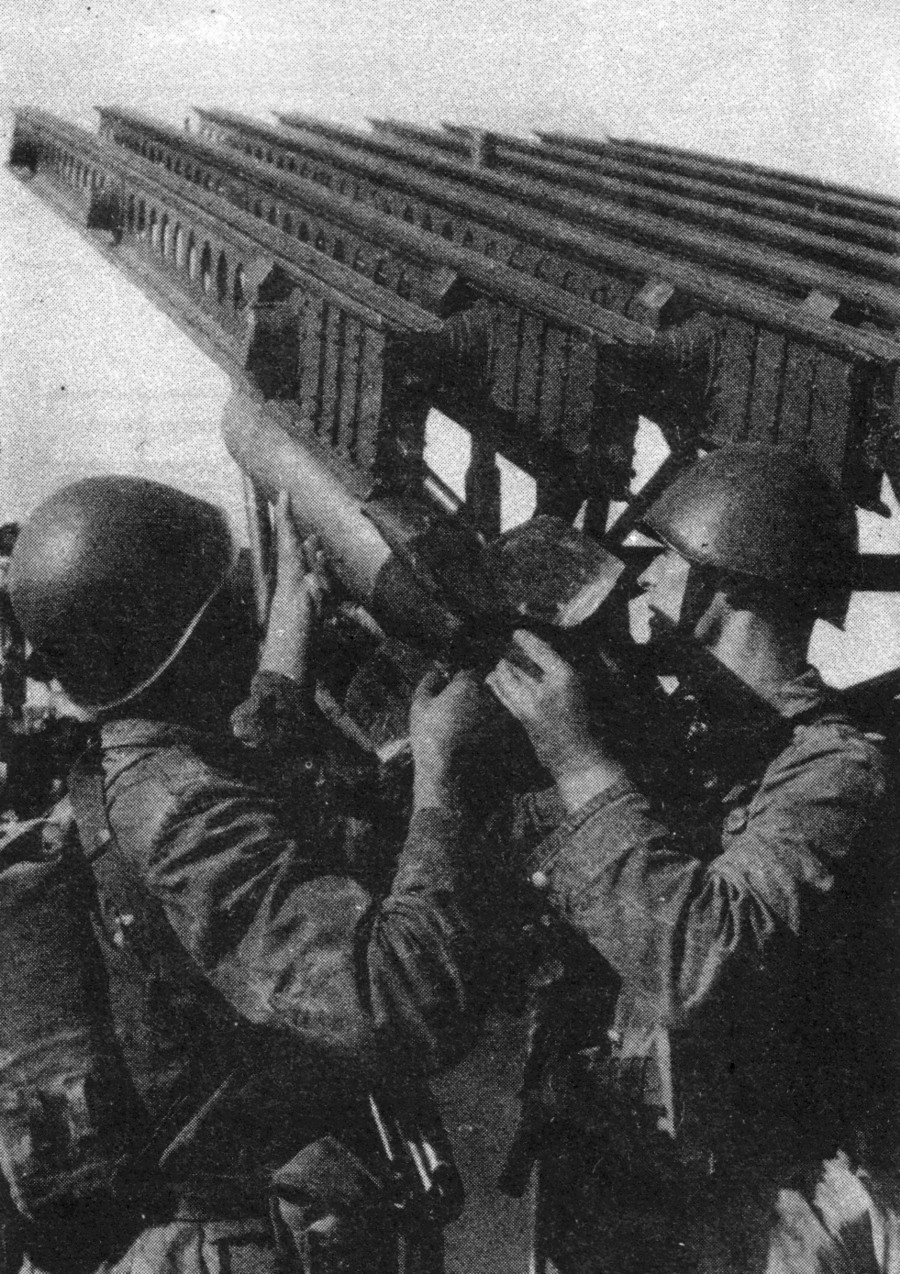
Reloading a BM-13

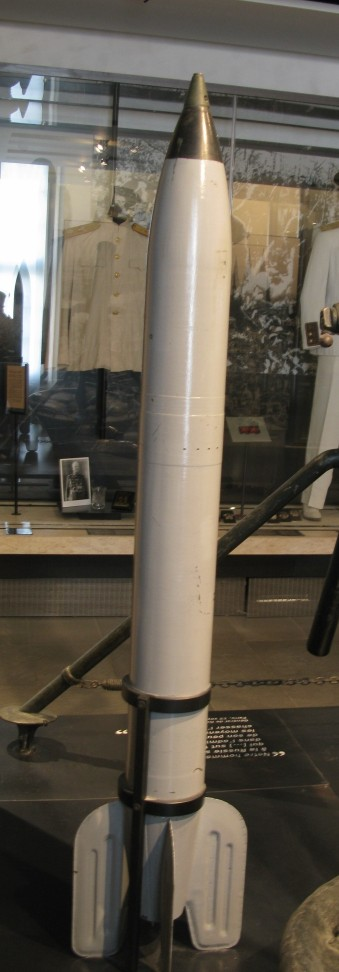
An M13 rocket for the Katyusha launcher on display in Musée de l'Armée.

Initial development of solid propellant rockets was carried out by Nikolai Tikhomirov at the Soviet Gas Dynamics Laboratory (GDL), with the first test-firing of a solid fuel rocket carried out in March 1928, which flew for about 1,300 meters. The rockets were used to assist take-off of aircraft and were later developed into the RS-82 and RS-132 (RS for Reaktivnyy Snaryad, 'rocket-powered shell') in the early 1930s led by Georgy Langemak, including firing rockets from aircraft and the ground. In June 1938, GDL's successor Reactive Scientific Research Institute (RNII) began building several prototype launchers for the modified 132 mm M-132 rockets. Firing over the sides of ZIS-5 trucks proved unstable, and V.N. Galkovskiy proposed mounting the launch rails longitudinally. In August 1939, the result was the BM-13 (BM stands for боевая машина (translit. boyevaya mashina), 'combat vehicle' for M-13 rockets).

The first large-scale testing of the rocket launchers took place at the end of 1938, when 233 rounds of various types were used. A salvo of rockets could completely straddle a target at a range of 5,500 metres (3.4 mi). But the artillery branch was not fond of the Katyusha, because it took up to 50 minutes to load and fire 24 rounds, while a conventional howitzer could fire 95 to 150 rounds in the same time. Testing with various rockets was conducted through 1940, and the BM-13-16 with launch rails for sixteen rockets was authorized for production. Only forty launchers were built before Germany invaded the Soviet Union in June 1941.

After their success in the first month of the war, mass production was ordered and the development of other models proceeded. The Katyusha was inexpensive and could be manufactured in light industrial installations which did not have the heavy equipment to build conventional artillery gun barrels. By the end of 1942, 3,237 Katyusha launchers of all types had been built, and by the end of the war total production reached about 10,000.

The truck-mounted Katyushas were installed on ZIS-6 6×4 trucks, as well as the two-axle ZIS-5 and ZIS-5V. In 1941, a small number of BM-13 launchers were mounted on STZ-5 artillery tractors. A few were also tried on KV tank chassis as the KV-1K, but this was a needless waste of heavy armour. Starting in 1942, they were also mounted on various British, Canadian and U.S. Lend-Lease trucks, in which case they were sometimes referred to as BM-13S. The cross-country performance of the Studebaker US6 2½-ton 6×6 truck was so good that it became the GAU's standard mounting in 1943, designated BM-13N (normalizovanniy, 'standardized'), and more than 1,800 of this model were manufactured by the end of World War II. After World War II, BM-13s were based on Soviet-built ZIS-151 trucks.

The 82 mm BM-8 was approved in August 1941, and deployed as the BM-8-36 on truck beds and BM-8-24 on T-40 and T-60 light tank chassis. Later these were also installed on GAZ-67 jeeps as the BM-8-8, and on the larger Studebaker trucks as the BM-8-48. In 1942, the team of scientists Leonid Shvarts, Moisei Komissarchik and engineer Yakov Shor received the Stalin Prize for the development of the BM-8-48

Based on the M-13, the M-30 rocket was developed in 1942. Its bulbous warhead required it to be fired from a grounded frame, called the M-30 (single frame, four round; later double frame, 8 round), instead of a launch rail mounted on a truck. In 1944 it became the basis for the BM-31-12 truck-mounted launcher.

A battery of BM-13-16 launchers included four firing vehicles, two reload trucks and two technical support trucks, with each firing vehicle having a crew of six. Reloading was executed in 3–4 minutes, although the standard procedure was to switch to a new position some 10 km away due to the ease with which the battery could be identified by the enemy. Three batteries were combined into a division (company), and three divisions into a separate mine-firing regiment of rocket artillery.

=== Variants ===
Soviet World War II rocket systems were named according to set patterns:

- Ground vehicles were designated BM-x-y, where x referred to the rocket model and y the number of launch rails or tubes.
- towed trailers and sledges used the format M-x-y
- In navy use, the order of the elements was different, taking the form y-M-x

For example, the BM-8-16 was a vehicle with 16 rails for M-8 rockets while the BM-31-12 fired the M-31 rockets from 12 launch tubes. Short names such as BM-8 or BM-13 were used as well. The chassis carrying the launcher was not defined in the name e.g. BM-8-24 referred to a truck mounted launcher (ZIS-5) as well as on the T-40 tank and on the STZ-3 artillery tractor.

Chassis for the launchers included:

- Soviet-built ZIS-5, ZIS-6, GAZ-AA trucks, and post war the ZIS-151
- STZ-5 tracked artillery tractor
- T-40 tank
- Lend-lease provided Studebaker US6 truck
- Armored train car
- River boat
- Towed sledge
- Towed trailer
- Backpack (portable variant, so called "mountain Katyusha")

Katyusha mountings
| Weapon | Caliber (mm) | Tubes/ rails | Chassis |
|---|---|---|---|
| BM-8 | 82 | 1 | Improvised vehicle mount, towed trailer or sled |
| M-8-6 | 82 | 6 | Towed trailer or sled |
| BM-8-8 | 82 | 8 | Willys MB jeep |
| M-8-12 | 82 | 12 | Towed trailer or sled |
| 16-M-8 | 82 | 16 | Project 1125 armored river boat |
| BM-8-24 | 82 | 24 | T-40 light tank, T-60 light tank |
| 24-M-8 | 82 | 24 | Project 1125 armored river boat |
| BM-8-36 | 82 | 36 | ZIS-5 truck, ZIS-6 truck |
| BM-8-40 | 82 | 40 | Towed trailer, GAZ-AA truck |
| BM-8-48 | 82 | 48 | ZIS-6 truck, Studebaker US6 U3 truck, rail carriage |
| BM-8-72 | 82 | 72 | Rail carriage |
| BM-13 | 132 | 24 | ZIS-6 truck, improvised vehicle mount, towed trailer or sled |
| 6-M-13 | 132 | 6 | Project 1125 armored river boat |
| BM-13-16 | 132 | 16 | International K7 "Inter" truck, International M-5-5-318 truck, Fordson WOT8 truck, Ford/Marmon-Herrington HH6-COE4 truck, Chevrolet G-7117 truck, Studebaker US6 U3 truck, GMC CCKW-352M-13 truck, rail carriage |
| M-20-6 | 132 | 6 | static launching rail |
| M-30-4 | 300 | 4 | static launching rail, in 1944 also available with 2x4 launching rails (M-30-8) |
| M-31-4 | 300 | 4 | static launching rail, in 1944 also available with 2x4 launching rails (M-31-8) |
| BM-31-12 | 300 | 12 | Studebaker US6 U3 truck |

Katyusha rockets:
| Weapon name | Caliber (mm) | Warhead kg (lb) | Maximum range m (yd) |
|---|---|---|---|
| M-8 | 82 | 0.64 (1.4) | 5,900 (6,500) |
| M-13 | 132 | 4.9 (11) | 8,740 (9,560) |
| M-13DD | 132 | 4.9 (11) | 11,800 (12,900) |
| M-13UK | 132 | 4.9 (11) | 7,900 (8,600) |
| M-20 | 132 | 18.4 (41) | 5,050 (5,520) |
| M-30 | 300 | 28.9 (64) | 2,800 (3,100) |
| M-31 | 300 | 28.9 (64) | 4,325 (4,730) |
| M-31UK | 300 | 28.9 (64) | 4,000 (4,400) |

The M-8 and M-13 rocket could also be fitted with smoke warheads, although this was not common.

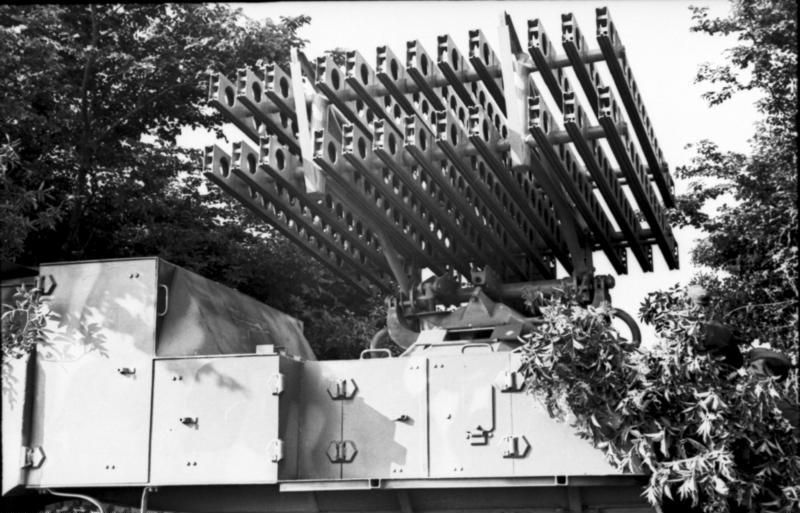
The German 8 cm Raketen-Vielfachwerfer was based on the Katyusha

==== Foreign variants ====
The Axis powers had captured Katyushas during the war. Germany considered producing a local copy, but instead created the 8 cm Raketen-Vielfachwerfer, which was based on the Katyusha.

Romania had started developing its Mareșal tank destroyer in late 1942. One of the first experimental models was equipped with a Katyusha rocket launcher and tested in the summer of 1943. The project was not continued.

=== Combat history ===
The multiple rocket launchers were top secret at the beginning of World War II and a special unit of NKVD troops was raised to operate them. On 14 July 1941, an experimental artillery battery of seven launchers was first used in battle at Rudnya, Smolensk Oblast under the command of Captain Ivan Flyorov, destroying a concentration of German troops with tanks, armored vehicles and trucks in the marketplace, causing massive German Army casualties and panicked retreat from the town. This was the first time the Katyusha was ever used in combat. Following the success, the Red Army organized new Guards mortar batteries for the support of infantry divisions. A battery's complement was standardized at four launchers. They remained under NKVD control until German Nebelwerfer rocket launchers became common later in the war.

On 8 August 1941, Stalin ordered the formation of eight special Guards mortar regiments under the direct control of the Reserve of the Supreme High Command (RVGK). Each regiment comprised three battalions of three batteries, totalling 36 BM-13 or BM-8 launchers. Independent Guards mortar battalions were also formed of 12 launchers in three batteries of four. By the end of 1941, there were eight regiments, 35 independent battalions, and two independent batteries in service, a total of 554 launchers.

In June 1942 heavy Guards mortar battalions were formed around the new M-30 static rocket launch frames, consisting of 96 launchers in three batteries. In July, a battalion of BM-13s was added to the establishment of a tank corps. In 1944, the BM-31 was used in motorized heavy Guards mortar battalions of 48 launchers. In 1943, Guards mortar brigades, and later divisions, were formed equipped with static launchers.

At dawn on 5 September the preparatory artillery and air bombardment began all along the front of the 24th, 1st Guards and 66th armies. But even on the main lines of advance the density of the artillery fire was not great and did not yield the necessary results. The attack began after Katyusha volleys.

By the end of 1942, 57 regiments were in service—together with the smaller independent battalions, this was the equivalent of 216 batteries: 21% BM-8 light launchers, 56% BM-13, and 23% M-30 heavy launchers. By the end of the war, the equivalent of 518 batteries were in service.

== Post-war development ==
The success and economy of multiple rocket launchers (MRL) have led them to continue to be developed. In the years following WWII, the BM-13 was replaced by the 140 mm BM-14 and the BM-31 was replaced by the 240 mm BM-24. During the Cold War, the Soviet Union fielded several models of Katyusha-like MRL, notably the BM-21 Grad launchers somewhat inspired by the earlier weapon, and the larger BM-27 Uragan. Advances in artillery munitions have been applied to some Katyusha-type multiple launch rocket systems, including bomblet submunitions, remotely deployed land mines, and chemical warheads.

BM-13s were used in the Korean War by the Chinese People's Volunteer Army and Korean People's Army against the South Korean and United Nations forces. Soviet BM-13s were known to have been imported to China before the Sino-Soviet split and were operational in the People's Liberation Army. The Viet Minh deployed them against the French Far East Expeditionary Corps during the Battle of Dien Bien Phu at the end of the First Indochina War.

== Recognition and honours ==
Participants in the creation of the Katyusha rocket launcher received official recognition only in 1991. By decree of the President of the Soviet Union Mikhail Gorbachev dated 21 June 1991, I. T. Kleymenov, G. E. Langemak, V. N. Luzhin, B. S. Petropavlovsky, B. M. Slonimer and N. I. Tikhomirov were posthumously awarded title of the Hero of Socialist Labour for their work on the creation of the Katyusha.

== See also ==
- Land Mattress, employed by Allied forces in World War II
- List of rocket artillery
- Nebelwerfer, the most common barrage rocket series employed by the Wehrmacht in World War II
- Panzerwerfer, German rocket launcher mounted on a half-track
- Reactive Scientific Research Institute where the Katyusha rocket launcher was created
- Soviet rocketry
- T34 Calliope, rocket launcher mounted on M4 Sherman tank chassis, used in small numbers 1944-1945
- Wurfrahmen 40, another German rocket launcher mounted on a half-track
