= ZIS-6 =

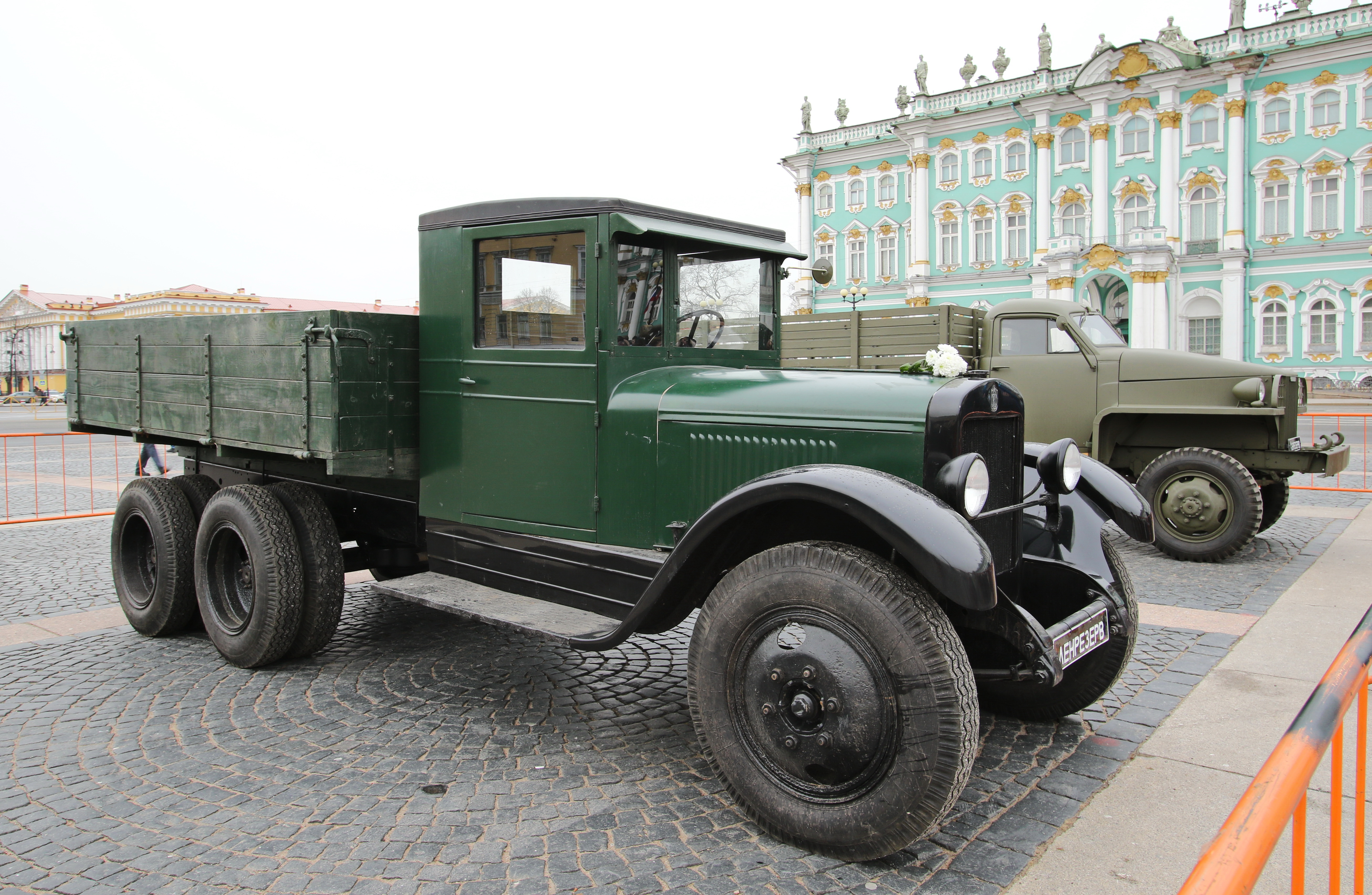

Overview
- Manufacturer: ZIS
- Production: 1933–1941
- Assembly: Russia: Moscow

Body and chassis
- Class: Truck
- Layout: front engine, 6×4

Powertrain
- Engine: 5.55 L ZIS-5, I6, 54 kW (73 hp)
- Transmission: 4-speed manual with 2 range transfer case

Dimensions
- Wheelbase: 3,360 mm (132.3 in)+1,080 mm (42.5 in)
- Height: 2,160 mm (85.0 in)
- Curb weight: 4,230 kg (9,326 lb)

Chronology
- Successor: ZIS-151

The ZIS-6 (Russian: ЗИС-6) is a Soviet general-purpose 6×4 army cargo truck, a three-axle version of the ZIS-5 two-axle truck. Prototypes were made in 1932 and serial production started in 1933. In October 1941 the Moscow Zavod imeni Stalina factory was evacuated, but a few more ZIS-6 trucks were assembled from parts in January 1942. A total of 21,239 units were produced. The ZIS-6 had a payload capacity of 4 tons.

A reliable truck, it served as a base for the creation of a number of specialized military modifications -- searchlight truck, radio and radio repair station, mobile field workshop, supply delivering vehicle, troops moving vehicle, and as an artillery towing vehicle -- but is best known for its role as the first multiple rocket launcher (Katyusha) in July 1941. It was built by the "Compressor" Plant's Design Office during World War II (1941–45). Very few ZIS-6 trucks survive till today.

Several dozen (exact number unknown) were converted to carry the 37 mm automatic air defense gun M1939 (61-K).

During the early World War II, the ZIS-6 was used as the chassis of the original BM-13 Katyusha multiple rocket launcher by the Red Army, nicknamed "Stalin's Organ" by German soldiers. The truck chassis was equipped with several different versions of the launcher. Later though, the American-produced Studebaker took over as the predominant platform for Katyusha launchers. The ZIS-6 also served as the basis for the VVS-RKKA aircraft fueller BZ-ZIS-6. After the war, the ZIS-6 was replaced with the all-wheel drive ZIS-151.

== Specification ==
- 6×4, 3-axle 2,5-ton (4-ton - highway)
- ZIS-5 based truck
- Bore/Stroke: 101.6/114.3 mm
- Tyres: 860 mm × 180 mm (34 in × 7 in)
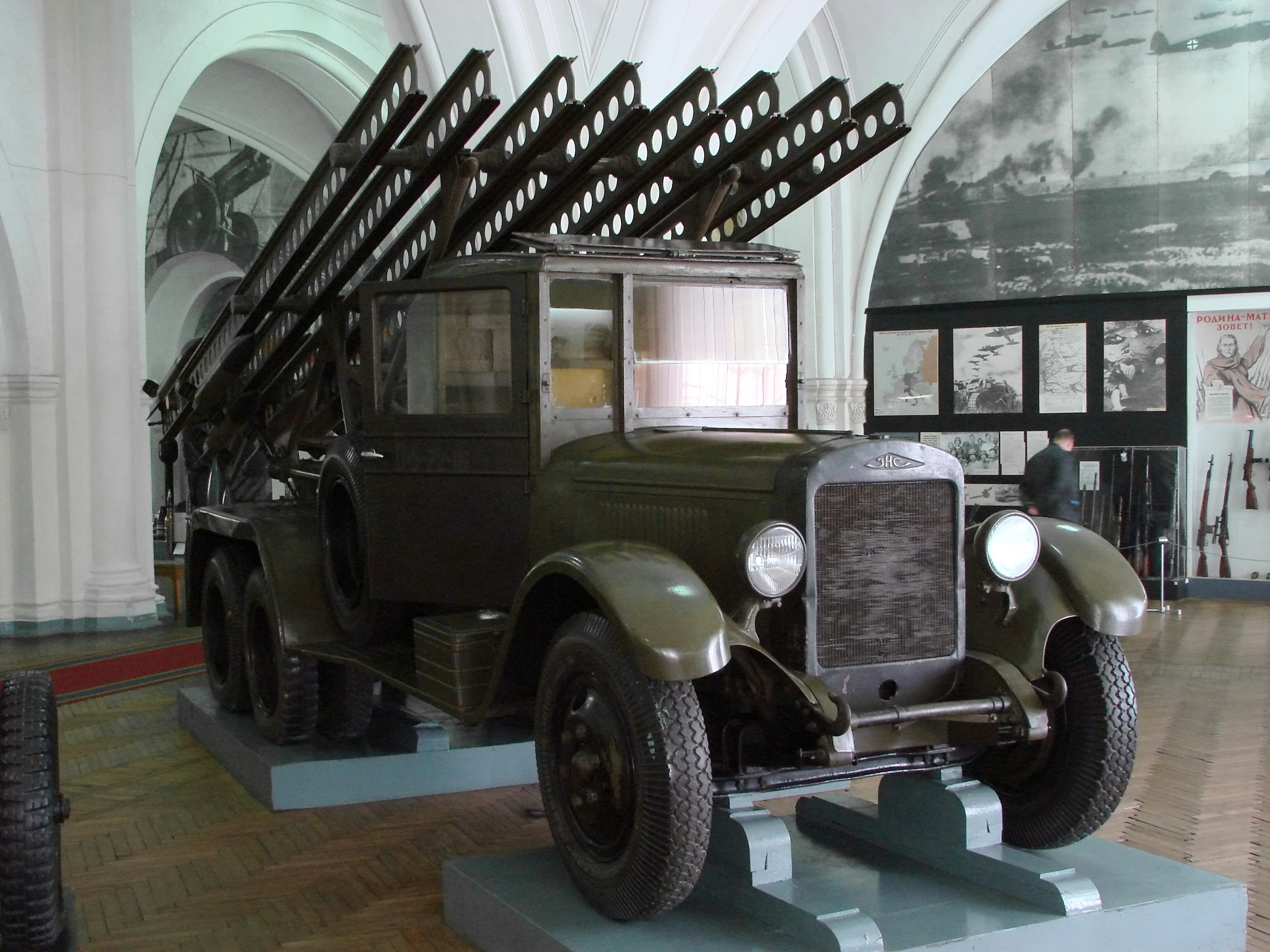
ZIS-6 platformed with BM-13 Katyusha battery

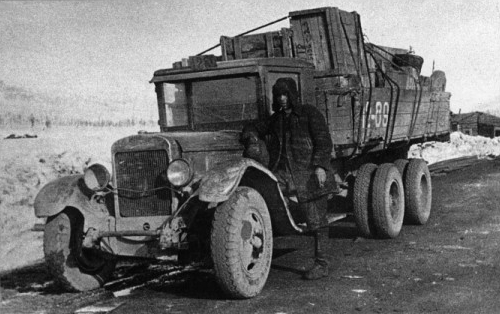
Kolyma road construction (1938)

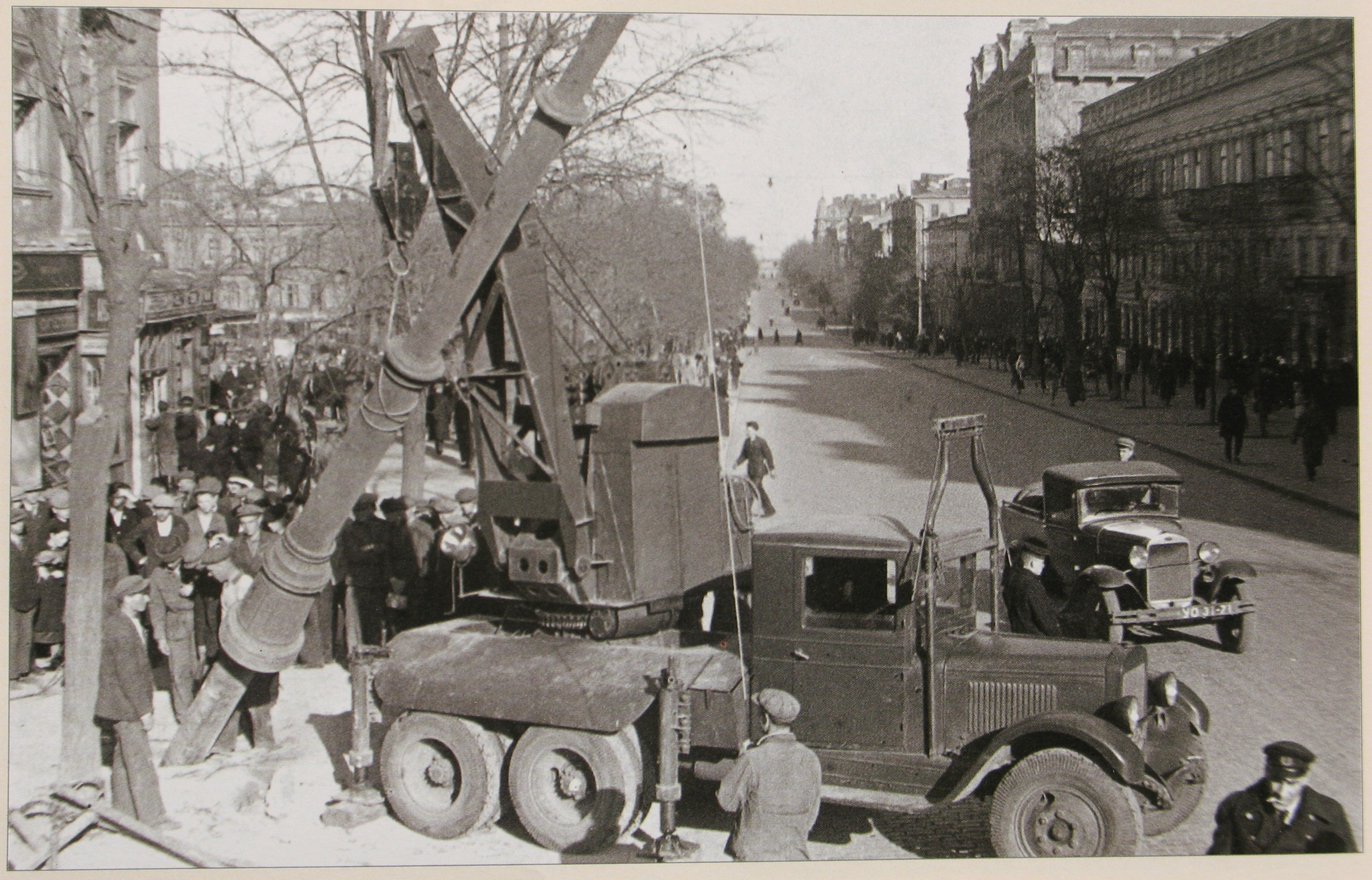
Civil used autocrane based on a ZIS-6 chassis in Odessa (1942)
