= ZIS-5 (truck) =

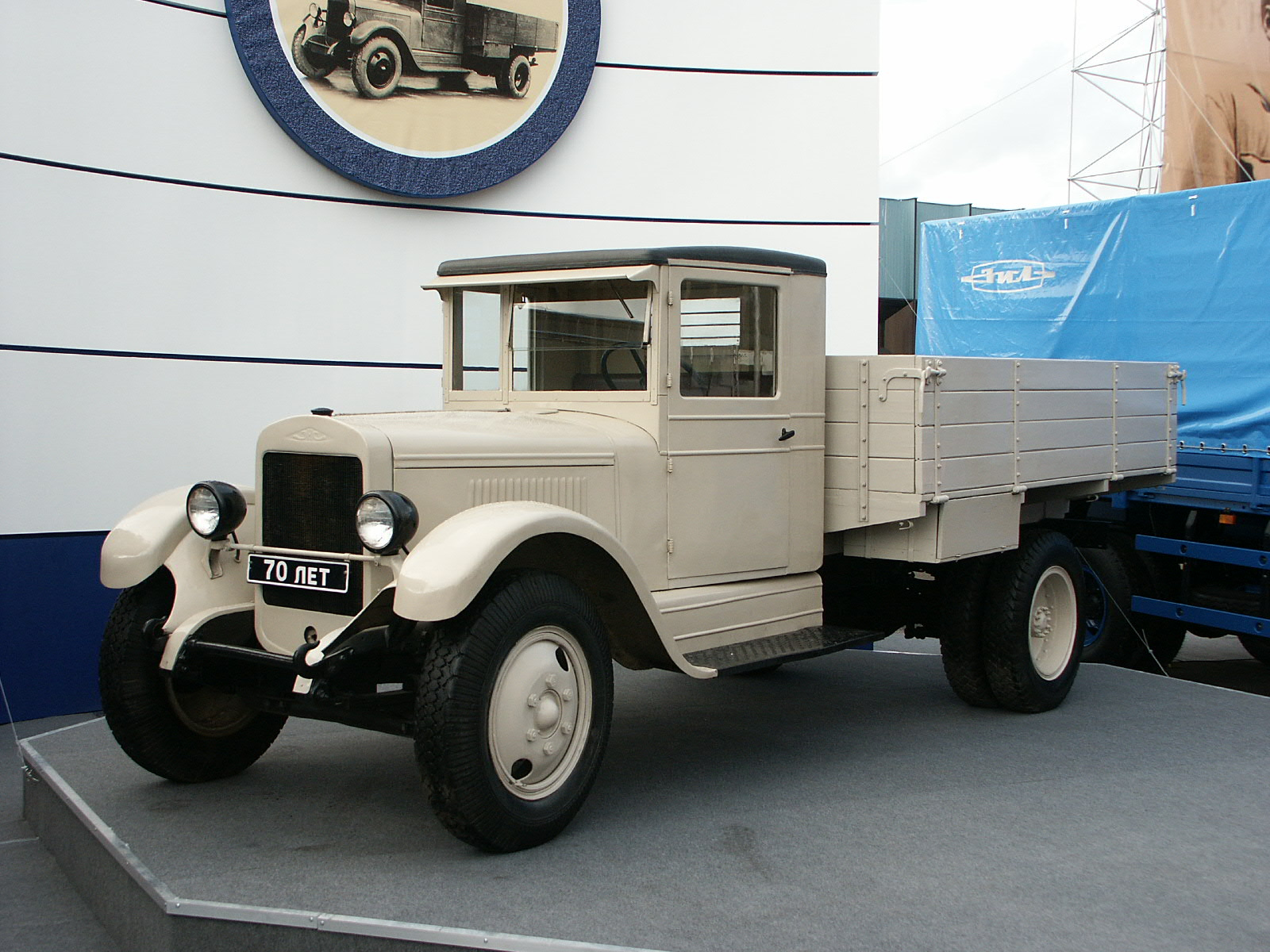

Overview
- Manufacturer: ZIS
- Production: 1933–1941, 1942–1948 (ZIS); 1942–1944 (UASZIS); 1944–1958 (UralZIS); c. 1 million produced
- Assembly: Moscow

Body and chassis
- Class: Truck
- Layout: FR
- Related: ZIS-6; Autocar Dispatch SD

Powertrain
- Engine: 5.6L ZIS-5 I6
- Transmission: 4-speed manual + 2-speed gearbox

Dimensions
- Wheelbase: 3,810 mm (150.0 in)
- Length: 6,060 mm (238.6 in)
- Width: 2,235 mm (88.0 in)
- Height: 2,160 mm (85.0 in) (cabin)
- Curb weight: 3,100 kg (6,834 lb)

Chronology
- Predecessor: AMO-3
- Successor: ZIS-150 (ZIS); UralZIS-355M (UralZIS)

The ZIS-5 (Russian: ЗИС-5) was a 4×2 Soviet truck produced by Moscow ZIS factory from 1933 to 1948; non-ZIS production lasted until 1958.

== Development ==
In 1931, Moscow Avtomobilnoe Moskovskoe Obshchestvo (AMO, Russian Автомобильное Московское Общество (АМО) — Moscow Automotive Enterprise) truck plant was re-equipped and expanded with the help of the American A.J. Brandt Co., and began to produce a new truck with designation of AMO-2. The AMO-2 was intended as a replacement of the previous AMO-F-15, the first Soviet truck ever built (it was a copy of the Italian Fiat F-15).

However, the AMO-2 was not an original development but instead was based on the Autocar Dispatch SD truck, after a license agreement with the Autocar Company. Some time later, the AMO-2 was modernized and improved, being renamed the AMO-3. In 1933 AMO was rebuilt again and renamed into Factory No. 2 Zavod Imeni Stalina (or Plant of Stalin's name, abbreviated in ZIS or ZiS).

The ZIS-5 is based on the Autocar Model CA which was produced under license (though two references state it was based on the AMO-3).

== Production ==
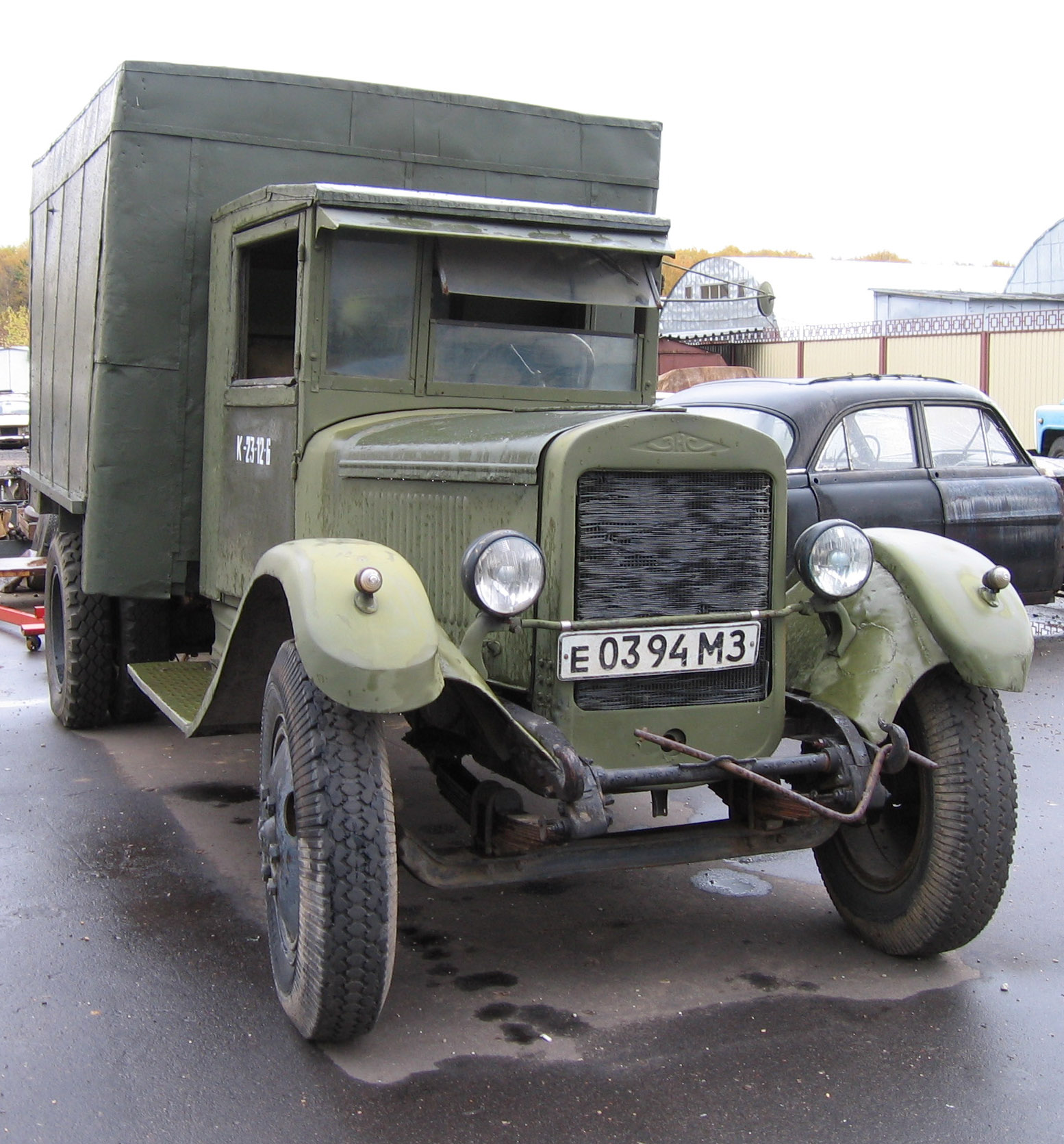
A ZIS-5 used for transporting bread.

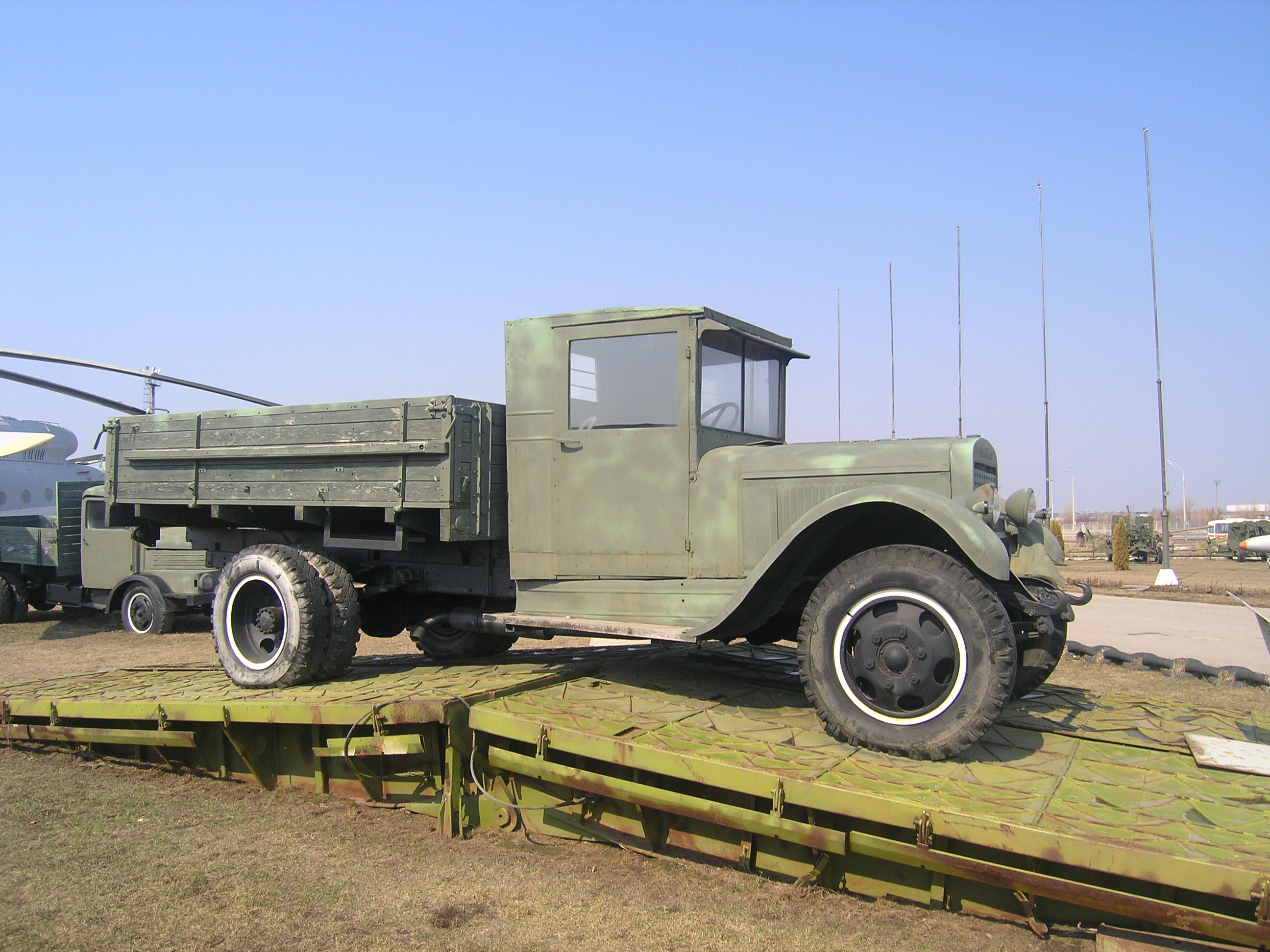
ZIS-5 in the Togliatti Technical Museum

Serial production of the new truck started on October 1, 1933. The truck was an instant success and, which together with the GAZ-AA, became the main Soviet truck of the 1930s through the 1950s. It also evolved into the workhorse of the Soviet Armed Forces 104,200 trucks were in use by the Red Army as of 20 June, 1941.

Facing the German invasion, in the autumn of 1941 the production line at Moscow plant was stopped. Some 12,800 pieces of equipment were moved to Ulyanovsk (on the Volga), to Miass (in the Chelyabinsk region of the Urals), and also to Shadrinsk and Chelyabinsk. Production at Ulyanovsk UAZZIS lasted from February 1942 to 1944. UralZIS at Ulyanovsk installed radiators with their own label and production there ran from July 1944 to 1955, well after the war.

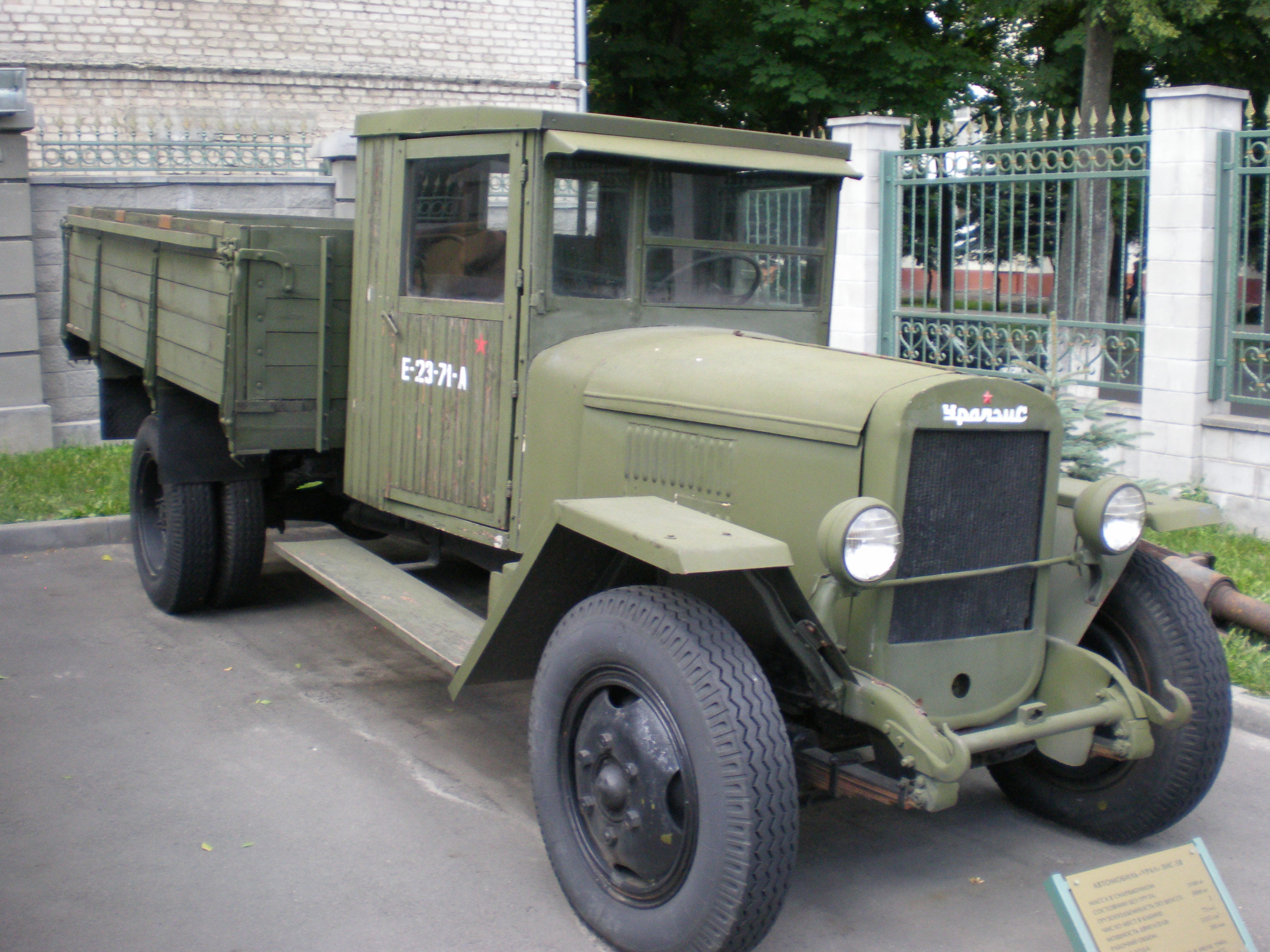
ZIS-5V

At the end of 1941 war shortages of raw materials forced change to the construction of the ZIS-5. All changes were focused on simplifying manufacture and using less raw materials: the round, stamped fenders were replaced with flat, bent ones, cabs and foot boards were now made from wood, brakes were removed from front wheels, and the rear body had the tailgate swinging only. Sometimes the right headlight was also removed, while bumpers were omitted from these versions.

The simplified model, designated ZIS-5V, was produced from May 1942 in Ulyanovsk, and later also in Moscow and Miass. Overall production of all models tallied about 1 million units (all plants), with ZIS alone producing 532,311 examples. During the War years about 83,000 ZIS-5 of both versions were produced.

The Moscow ZIS plant restarted production of the ZIS-5V in April 1942. Near the end of 1947 the new ZIS-120 engine was complete, but the truck (the ZIS-150) was not, so these engines were placed in ZIS-5V chassis, where they were named the ZIS-50. 13,701 ZIS-50s were produced in 1947 and 1948. The Moscow plant discontinued ZIS-5V & ZIS-50 trucks on 30 April, 1948, in favor of the ZIS-150 replacement. In 1956 UralZIS modified the ZIS-5 with a new engine, carburetor, steering mechanism, 12V electrical system, and oval fenders. This new model received the designation of UralZIS-355 or ZIS-355. The Miass plant continued to produce the ZIS-5V until 1958.

== Utilization ==
During the war the ZIS-5 was used on all fronts, where it was greatly appreciated for its remarkably simple and reliable construction. Apart from cargo duties, the ZIS-5 was used as a light artillery tractor and for troop transportation (25 soldiers could sit in five benches placed in the rear body). ZIS-5 served also as base for many special trucks like refuellers, field workshops, ambulances, portee guns, and AA platforms.

After the GAZ-AA, the ZIS-5 was the 2nd most used Red Army truck of 1933-1943 period. The intensive growth of Lend Lease trucks shipping in 1943-1944 did not affect the first line use of the "Tryohtonka" (as soldiers called the ZIS-5 for its 3-ton payload), while the GAZ-AA got somewhat phased out to secondary roles.

ZIS-5 trucks were used on the "Road of Life", the only supply line to the besieged city of Leningrad, on the frozen surface of Ladoga Lake. The remains of one was recovered from the bottom of the lake in 2024 and is to be exhibited in the Battle of Leningrad Museum.

== IZ armored car ==
The ZIS-5 was used as the basis for improvised armored cars made by the Izshorsky plant in 1941 under the designation "IZ". The initial order of 20 vehicles were equipped with a 45 mm anti-tank gun M1937 (53-K), 3-10mm of armor, and a Degtyaryov machine gun. The engine compartment was sealed with two armored intakes over the front grille. Suspensions remained unchanged despite the increased weight from the gun and armor, but this did not seem to hamper the truck's performance. It was decided that the design was successful enough to warrant around 80 more vehicles being built after the initial order for 20 had been completed. Not all of these carried the 45mm gun, some carried quad-Maxim guns, and others were left unarmed to function more as Armoured personnel carriers. The first of the cars was delivered to the Leningrad People’s Militia on 15 July, 1941. One car was captured by the Wehrmacht. A few were captured by the Finnish Army and used through early 1942. The last operational cars were seen around Leningrad in January 1943.

== Export ==
ZIS-5 was the first Soviet motor vehicle to be exported. With over 1 million ZIS-5 trucks made overall, the USSR had ample opportunity to offer it for sale abroad.

A batch of 100 trucks were sold to Turkey in 1934; other quantities were subsequently purchased by Afghanistan, Iraq, Iran, Spain, China, Latvia, Lithuania, Estonia, Mongolia, and Romania. Export versions featured a nickeled radiator and a bumper with two strips of nickel.

Some trophy vehicles were used by Finns who had captured them during the Winter War of 1939–40, and by Germans after the invasion of the Soviet Union in June 1941 until Germany's surrender in 1945.

== Variants ==
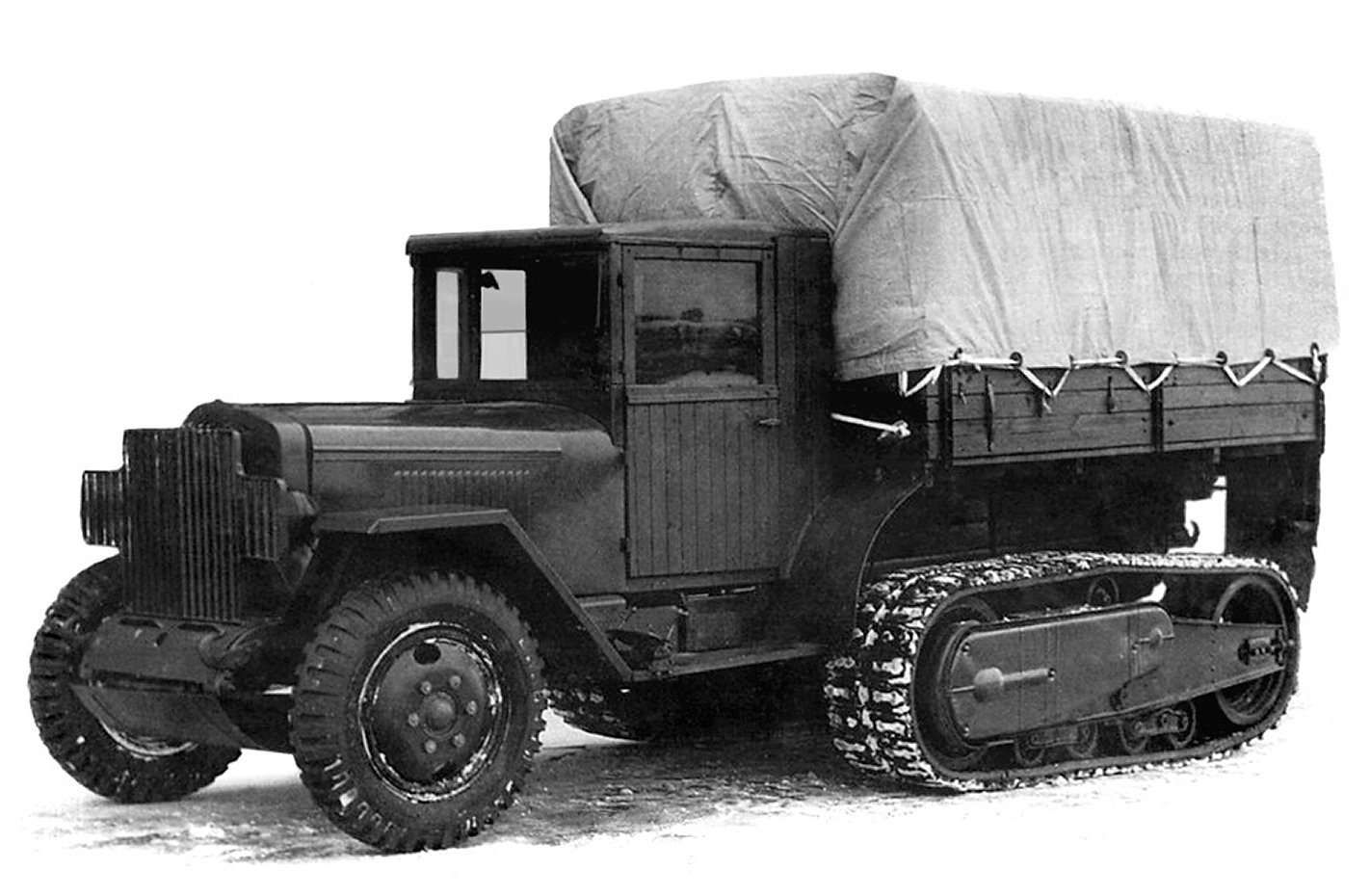
ZIS-42M

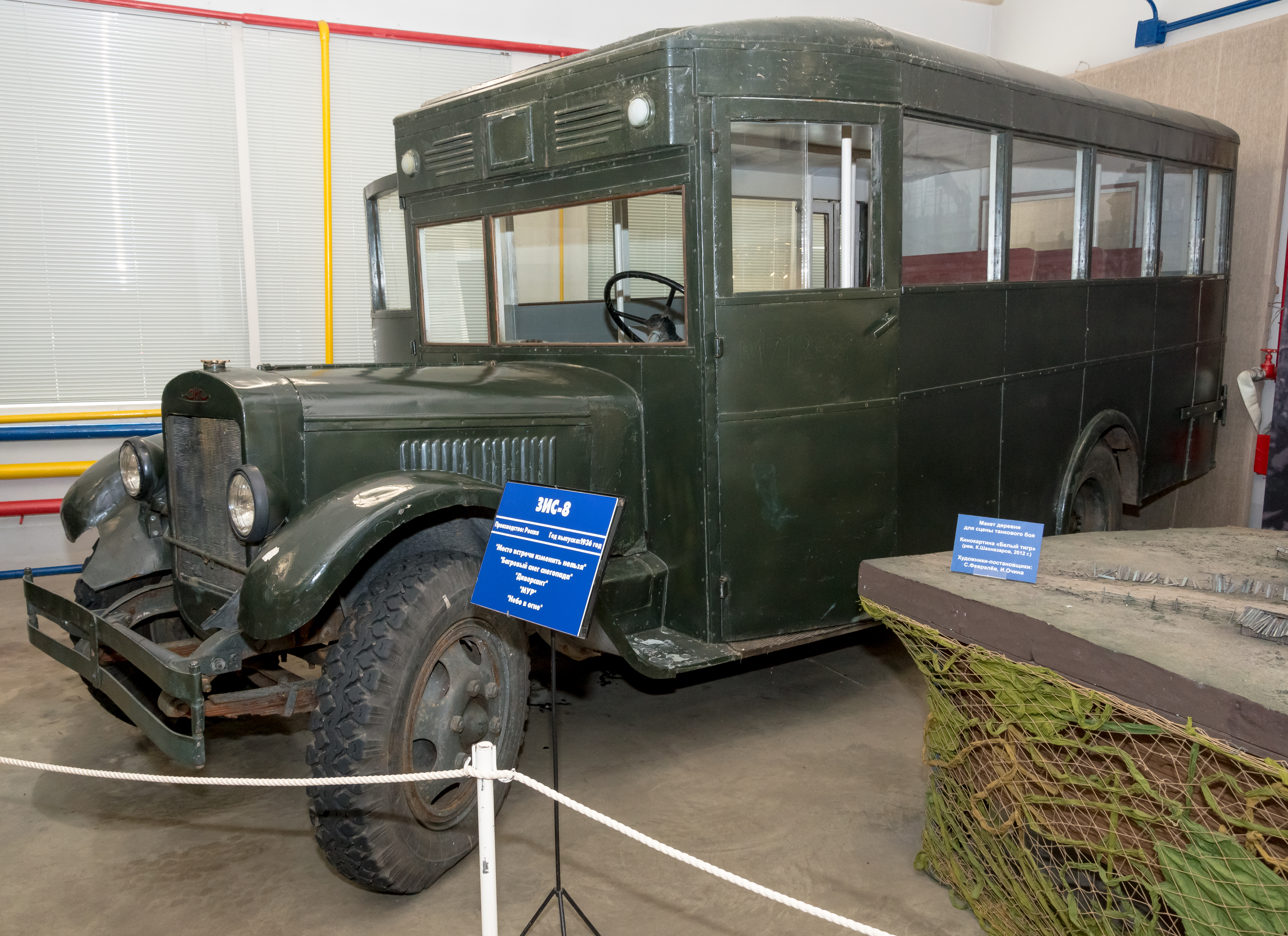
ZIS-8 "Ferdinand" used in the film The Meeting Place Cannot Be Changed

- ZIS-5: Standard production version. Produced 1934–1941 and 1942–1947.
- ZIS-5E: Modernized, 3 ton version of ZIS-5, prototype for ZIS-15.
- ZIS-5V: Simplified version. Produced 1942–1947.
- ZIS-6: Three-axle version. Produced 1934–1941.
- ZIS-8: Bus version based on ZIS-11. Produced 1934–1938.
- ZIS-10: Tractor-unit version. Produced 1938–1941.
- ZIS-11: Long wheelbase version (for fire fighting vehicles). Produced 1934–1936.
- ZIS-12: Long wheelbase version (for special purpose). Produced 1934–1938.
  - ZIS-12 (94-KM): Variant with two 25 mm autocannons for anti-aircraft duties, with a couple hundred produced 1944–1945.
- ZIS-13: Gas generator version, based on ZIS-14. Produced 1936–1939.
- ZIS-14: Long wheelbase version (for special purpose). Produced in 1934.
- ZIS-15: Prototype replacement for ZIS-5. Produced in 1937.
- ZIS-16: Bus version. Produced 1938–1941.
  - ZIS-16C: Ambulance version based on ZIS-16. Produced 1939–1941.
- ZIS-17: Prototype bus version based on ZIS-15. Produced in 1939.
- ZIS-18: Gas producer version (similar to ZIS-13, except based on the ZIS-5).
- ZIS-19: Dump truck version. Produced 1939–1946.
- ZIS-20: Prototype dump truck version.
- ZIS-21: Gas generator version (with wood gas unit NATI-G14). Produced 1939–1941.
- ZIS-22: Halftrack version. Produced 1940–1941.
  - ZIS-22M Prototype improvement of ZIS-22. Produced in 1941.
- ZIS-23: Three-axle version of ZIS-15.
- ZIS-24: Four-wheel-drive version of ZIS-15.
- ZIS-25: Gas generator version of ZIS-15.
- ZIS-26: Tractor unit version of ZIS-15.
- ZIS-28: Engine testbed based on ZIS-15.
- ZIS-30: Compressed gas version. Produced 1940–1941.
- ZIS-31: Gas generator version (similar to ZIS-21, except with charcoal unit NATI-G23).
- ZIS-32: Four-wheel-drive version. Produced in 1941.
- ZIS-33: Halftrack version. Produced in 1940.
- ZIS-34: 6x4 version. Produced 1940–1941.
- ZIS-35: Modernized version of ZIS-33.
- ZIS-36: Prototype 6x6 version. Produced in 1941.
- ZIS-41: Gas producer version. Produced 1940–1944.
- ZIS-42: Halftrack version. Produced 1942–1944.
  - ZIS-42M: Modernized ZIS-42.
  - ZIS-43: Armed version of ZIS-42, boasting a 61-k 37 mm anti-aircraft autocannon.
- ZIS-44: Ambulance version based on ZIS-5V.
- ZIS-50: ZIS-5 with ZIS-150 engine. Produced 1947–1948.
- ZIS-S1: Dump truck version. Produced 1947–1949.
- LET: Experimental electric vehicle, based on ZIS-5. Produced in 1935.
- ZIS-LTA: Prototype halftrack logging truck, based on ZIS-5. Produced in 1949.
- ZIS-MF: 100 h.p. version. Produced in 1943.

== Specification ==
- 4x2, 2-axle 3-ton cargo truck
- Overall production: about 1 million
- Engine: carburetor, 73 hp(*)/2300rpm 6-cyl. SV, 5557 cc, water-cooled 250 nm torque(from Jan. 1944 - 76 hp/2400rpm, from early 1950s - 85 hp)
- Bore/Stroke: 101.6/114.3 mm
- Length: 6,060 mm (238.6 in) (with bumper)
- Height: 2,160 mm (85.0 in)
- Width: 2,235 mm (88.0 in)
- Wheelbase: 3,810 mm (150.0 in)
- Transmission: 4 speed unsynchronized synchronizers, 2 range transfer case
- Weight: 3,100 kg (6,834 lb) (unloaded)
- Maximal speed: 60 km/h (37 mph) (from early 1950s - 70 km/h (43 mph))
- Tyres: 34x7 or 9,00x20 (post-war) inches, admittable change for 36x8.
- Fuel consumption: 34.0 L/100 km

(*) People who investigated ZIS-5 state that the real power of the engine was less than claimed in official documents and equal to 67-68 hp (rated horsepower is not the same as brake horsepower).

== See also ==
- Katyusha rocket launcher
