= Landwasserschlepper =

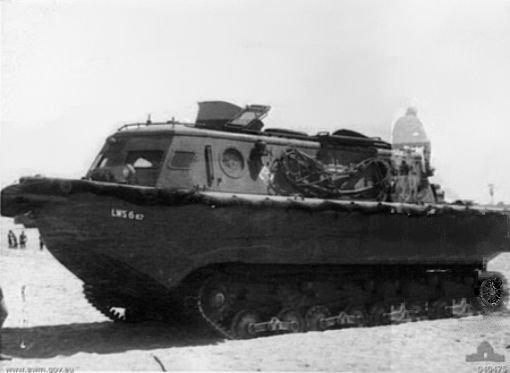
- Type: Tracked amphibious tractor
- Place of origin: Germany

Specifications
- Mass: 13 t
- Length: 8.60 m (28 ft 3 in)
- Width: 3.16 m (10 ft 4 in)
- Height: 3.13 m (10 ft 3 in)
- Crew: 2 plus 20 passengers
- Armor: none
- Engine: Maybach HL120, V12, petrol, 11,867 cc (724in^{3}); 300 hp (224 kW) at 3,000 rpm
- Power/weight: 8.8 hp/t
- Maximum speed: 35 km/h (21 mph) road 12 km/h (7½ mph) water

Landwasserschlepper (LWS) was an unarmed amphibious tractor produced in Germany during World War II.

== Origins and development ==
Ordered by the Heereswaffenamt in 1935 for use by German Army engineers, the Landwasserschlepper (or LWS) was intended as a lightweight river tug with some capacity to operate on land.

Intended to aid river crossing and bridging operations, it was designed by Rheinmetall-Borsig of Düsseldorf. The hull was similar to that of a motor launch, resembling a tracked boat with twin rear-mounted tunnelled propellers and twin rudders. On land, it rode on steel-shod tracks with four bogies per side.

By the autumn of 1940 three prototypes had been completed and were assigned to Tank Detachment 100 as part of Operation Sea Lion. It was intended to use them for pulling ashore unpowered assault barges during the invasion and for towing vehicles across the beaches. They would also have been used to carry supplies directly ashore during the six hours of falling tide when the barges were grounded. This involved towing a Kässbohrer amphibious trailer (capable of transporting 10-20 tons of freight) behind the LWS.

The Landwasserschlepper was demonstrated to General Franz Halder on 2 August 1940 by the Reinhardt Trials Staff on the island of Sylt and, though he was critical of its high silhouette on land, he recognized the overall usefulness of the design. It was proposed to build enough LWSs that each invasion barge could be assigned one or two of them, but difficulties in mass-producing the vehicle prevented implementation of that plan.

== Operational history ==
Due to protracted development, the Landwasserschlepper did not enter regular service until 1942 and, though it proved useful in both Eastern Front and North Africa campaign, it was produced in only small numbers. In 1944 a completely new design was introduced, the LWS II. This vehicle was based on a Panzer IV tank chassis and featured a small raised armored driver's cabin and a flat rear deck with four fold-down intake and exhaust stacks.

Landwasserschlepper remained operational until the end of the war in May 1945.

== See also ==
- Beach armoured recovery vehicle
