= Ural-375 =

Ural-375, Ural-375D
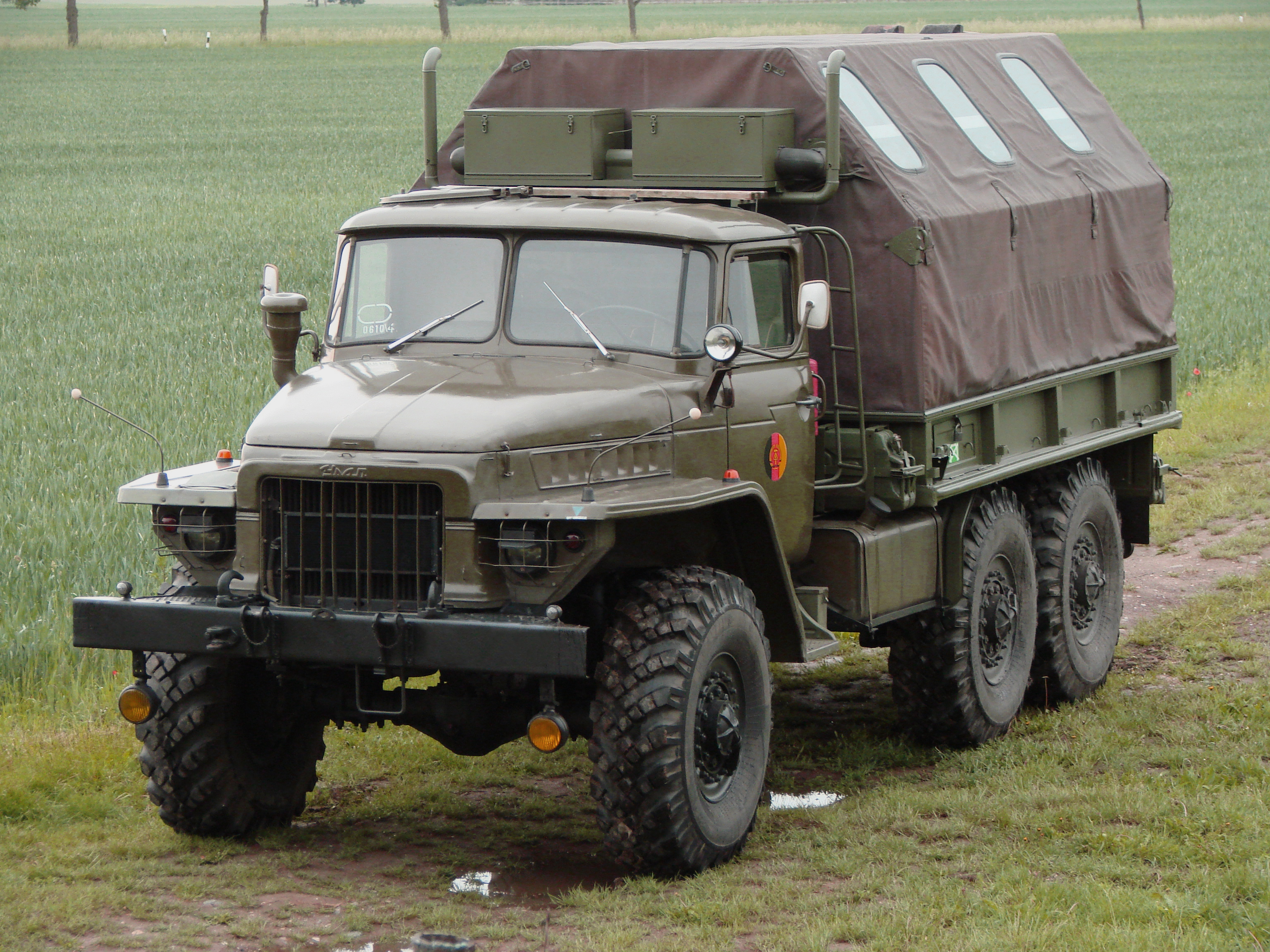

Overview
- Manufacturer: Ural Automobile Plant, Miass
- Production: 1961–1993; 1961–1964 (Ural-375); 1964–1983 (Ural-375D); 1982–1991 (Ural-375DM)

Body and chassis
- Class: Truck

Powertrain
- Engine: 7.0L ZIL-375Ya gasoline V8
- Transmission: 5-speed manual + 2-speed transfer case

Dimensions
- Length: 7,350 mm (289.4 in)
- Width: 2,960 mm (116.5 in)
- Height: 2,980 mm (117.3 in) (with tent)
- Curb weight: 8,400 kg (18,519 lb)

Chronology
- Predecessor: Ural-355M
- Successor: Ural-4320

The Ural-375 is a general purpose 4.5 ton 6×6 truck produced at the Ural Automotive Plant in the Russian SFSR from 1961 to 1993. The Ural-375 replaced the ZIL-157 as the standard Soviet Army truck in 1979, and was replaced by the Ural-4320.

The Ural-375 was used, for example, as a platform for the BM-21 Grad rocket launcher, as a troop carrier, and as a supply carrier.

The Ural-375 was developed during the 1950s-1960s and used many chassis components from the MAZ-200 truck, the Ural-375 used a 7.0 liter V8 engine, the design of which was based on the 6.0 liter V8 engine from the ZIL-130 truck, and most parts are interchangeable between the truck engines. The increase in displacement was achieved by increasing the bore of the cylinders to 108 mm, while the piston stroke of 95 mm was preserved. The engine block between the trucks was the same, as was the crankshafts, with the main difference being the pistons.

== Models ==
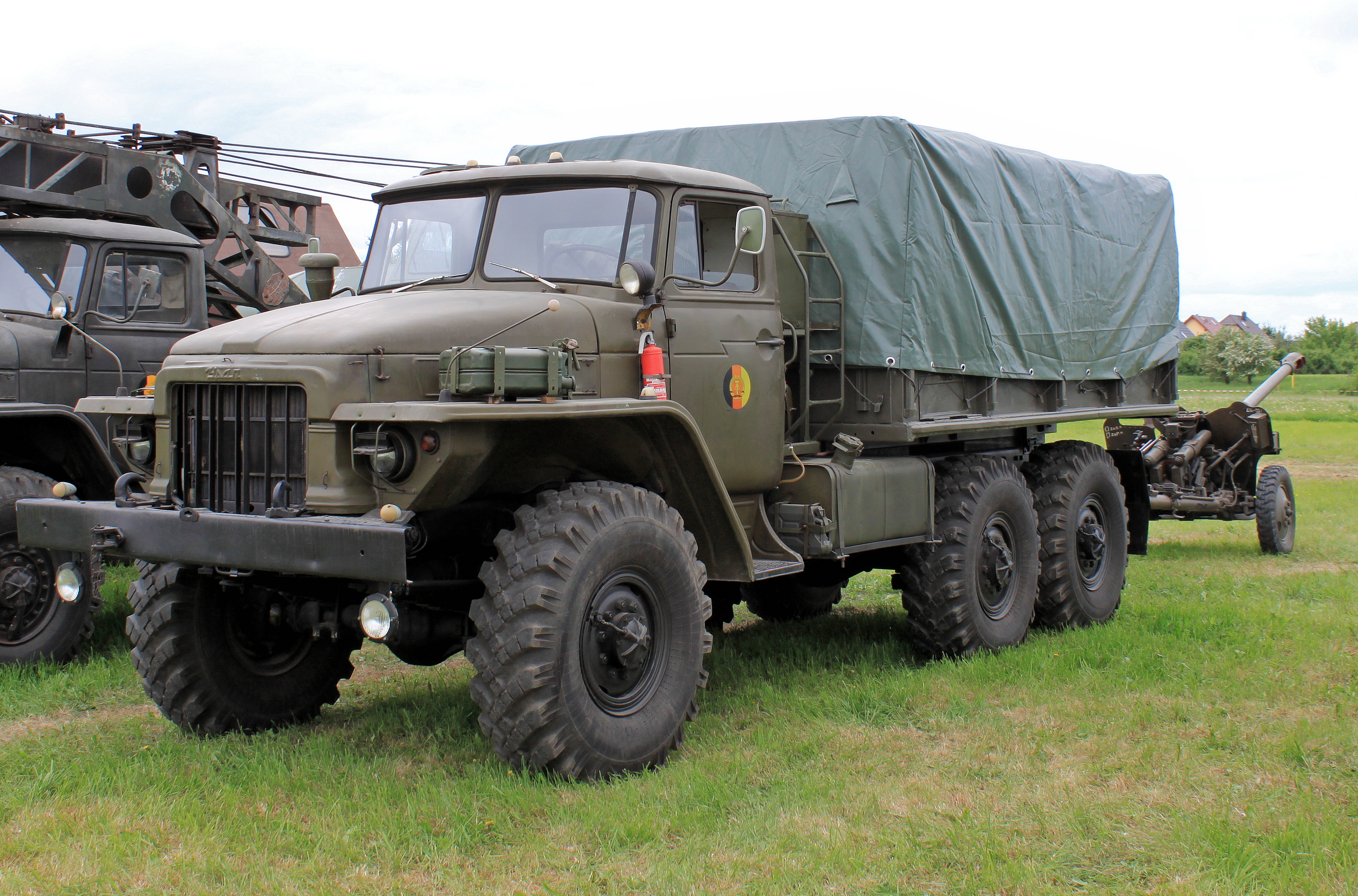
Ural-375D with 85 mm divisional gun D-44

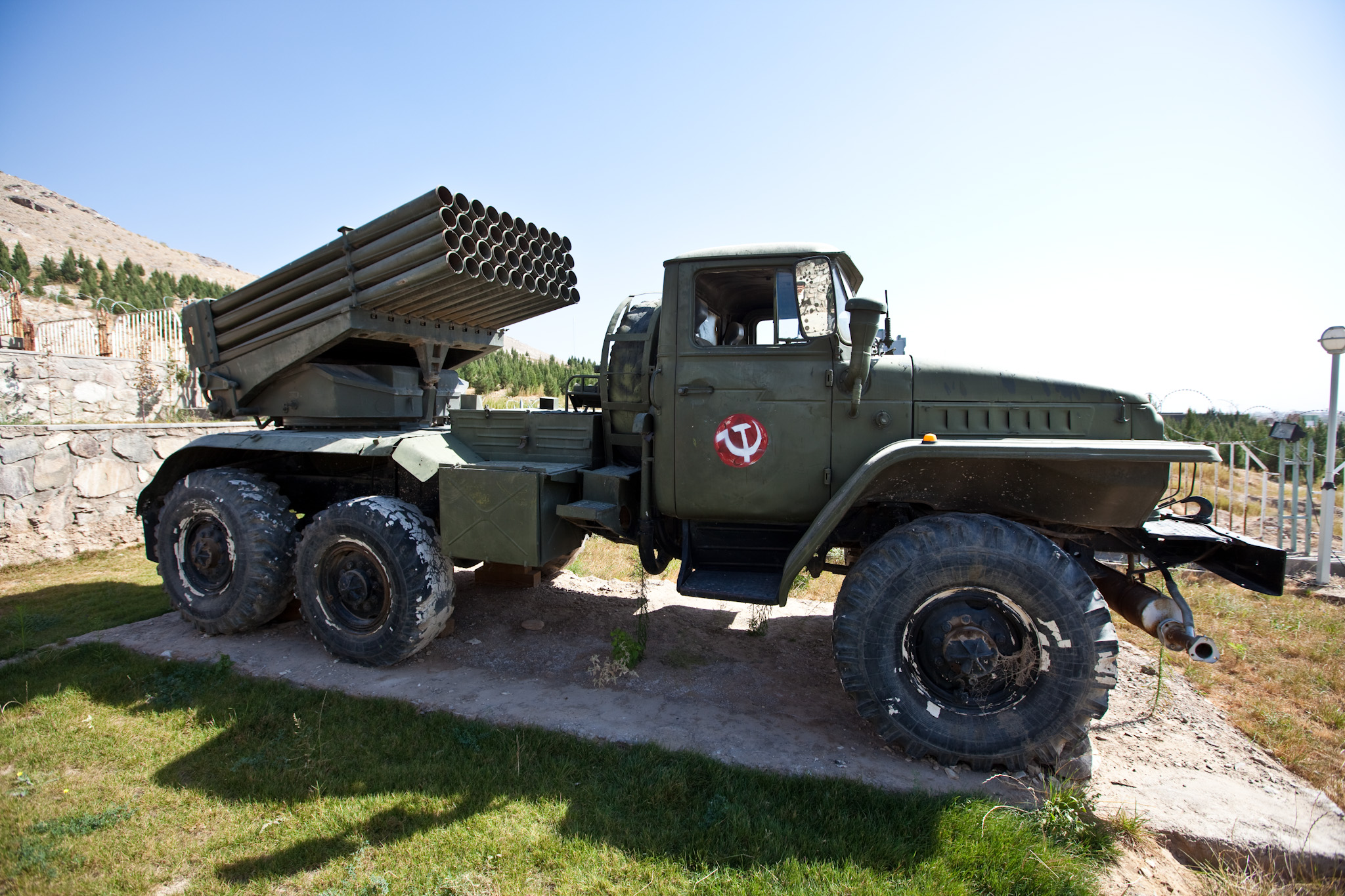
BM-21 Grad on Ural-375D chassis in a museum in Herat, Afghanistan

The Ural-375 comes in a variety of models (the list is not exhaustive):

- Ural-375, the base model. It has a canvas roof, and no steel cabin
- Ural-375A, a slightly longer model
- Ural-375D, the most produced 375; it has a proper all-steel cabin
- Ural-375E KET-L, a recovery vehicle equipped a front-mounted and a rear-mounted winch along with a jib crane.
- Ural-375S, a 6×6 tractor
- Ural-377, a civilian 6×4 truck
- Ural-377S, a 6×4 tractor
- Ural-375DM, modernized version of the Ural-375D, built at least until 1991

== Specifications ==
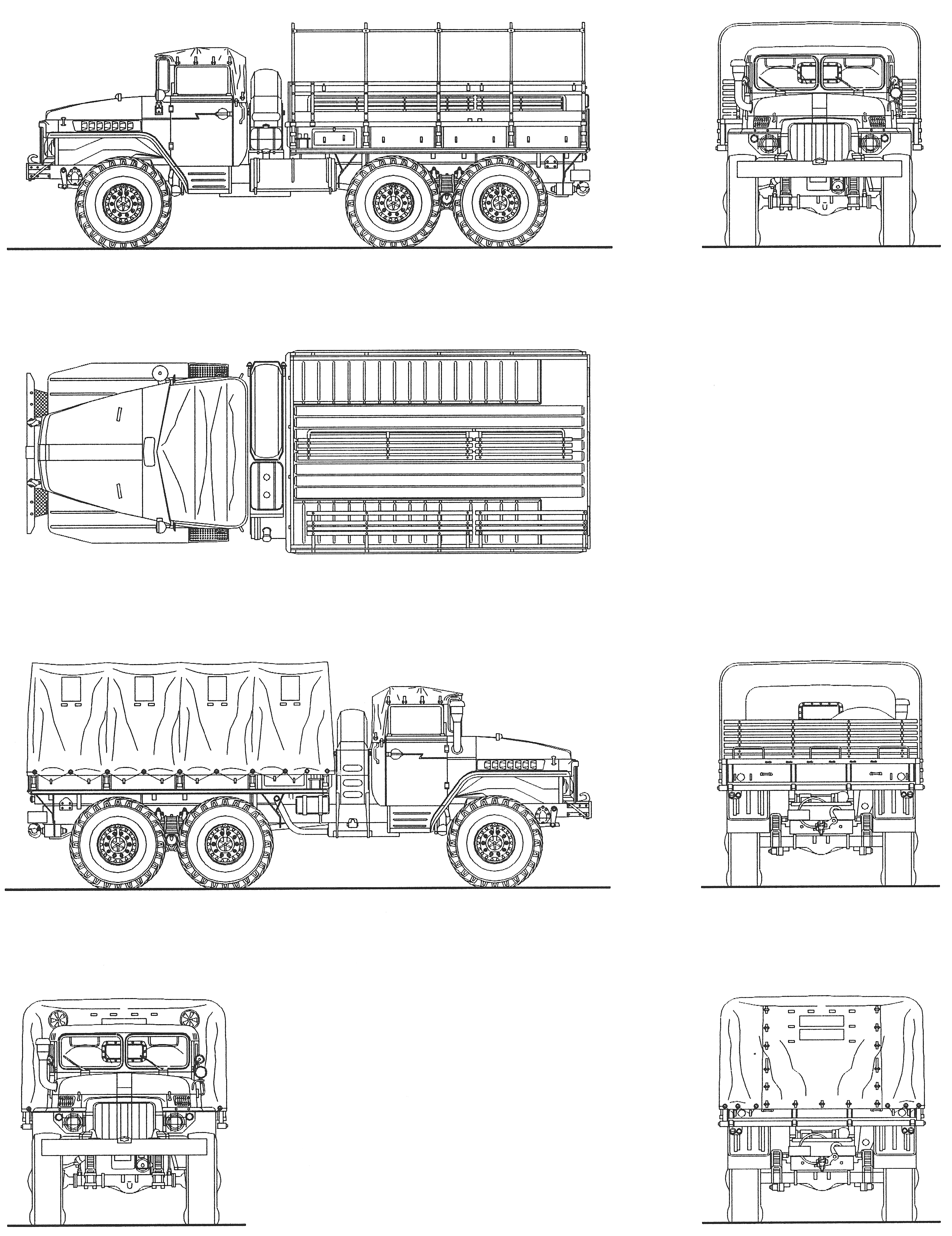
Ural-375

- Conventional cab, 3 seats
- Payload: 4,800 kg (10,580 lb)
- Max. permissible mass: 13,200 kg (29,100 lb)
- Suspension: live beam axles, leaf springs
- Engine: 130 kW (180 PS) (GOST) ZIL-375Ya 7.0-litre V8 petrol (carburetor) pushrod engine
- Gearbox: 5×2-speed gearbox
- Max. speed: 75 km/h (47 mph)
- Brakes: Pneumatic drum brakes
- Fording depth: 1500 mm (59 in)
- Dimensions: L×W×H = 7350 × 2690 × 2980 mm (289.4 × 105.9 × 117.3 in); includes tarpaulin
- Track width: 2000 mm (78.7 in)
- Turning circle: 22,000 mm (866 in)
- Ground Clearance: 400 mm (15.7 in)
- Tires: 360–510 mm (14–20 in), pressure 49–314 kPa (0.5–3.2 kgf/cm^{2})
- Fuel tank: 300 + 60 L (79 + 16 US gal)
- Fuel economy: 50–45 L/100 km (4.7–5.2 mpg_{‑US})

== Users ==
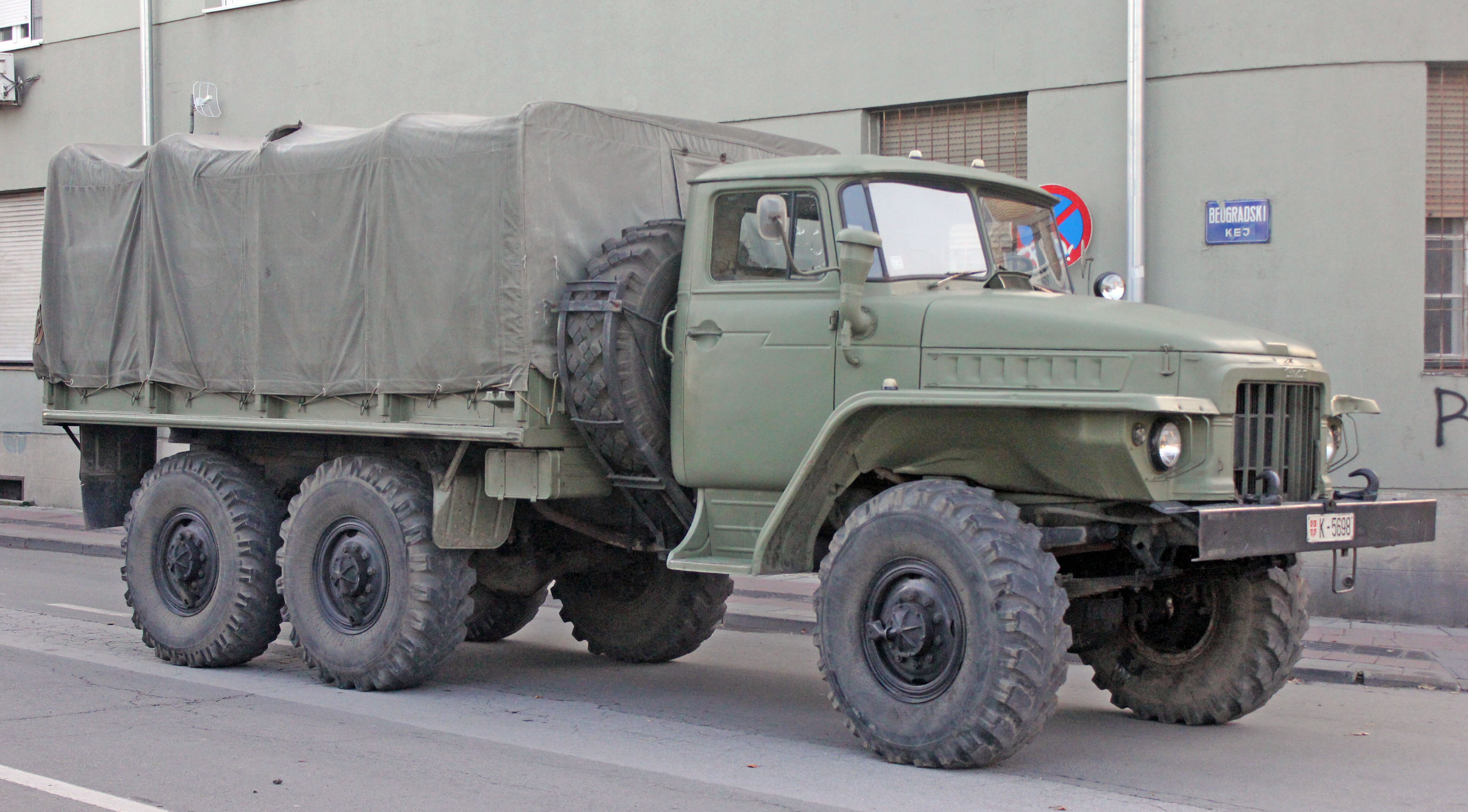
Ural-375D truck of Serbian Army

- Angola
- Egypt
- Ethiopia
- Georgia
- Hungary
- Iran: Received Ural-375Ds in the 1970s.
- Namibia
- North Korea
- Poland: Only specialized variants in use.
- Russia: 4000+ in active service over 10,000 in storage most in need of overhaul.
- Serbia
- Syria
- Transnistria
- Ukraine: Seen in use during the Russian invasion of Ukraine
- Vietnam

=== Former users ===
- Afghanistan
- East Germany: Passed onto Germany.
- Iraq: All destroyed or retired in 2003.
- Romania: All destroyed or retired, only one known in conservation in poor shape.
- Soviet Union: Passed on to successor states.

== See also ==
- Ural-5323
- Russian Ground Forces
