= UralZIS-355M =

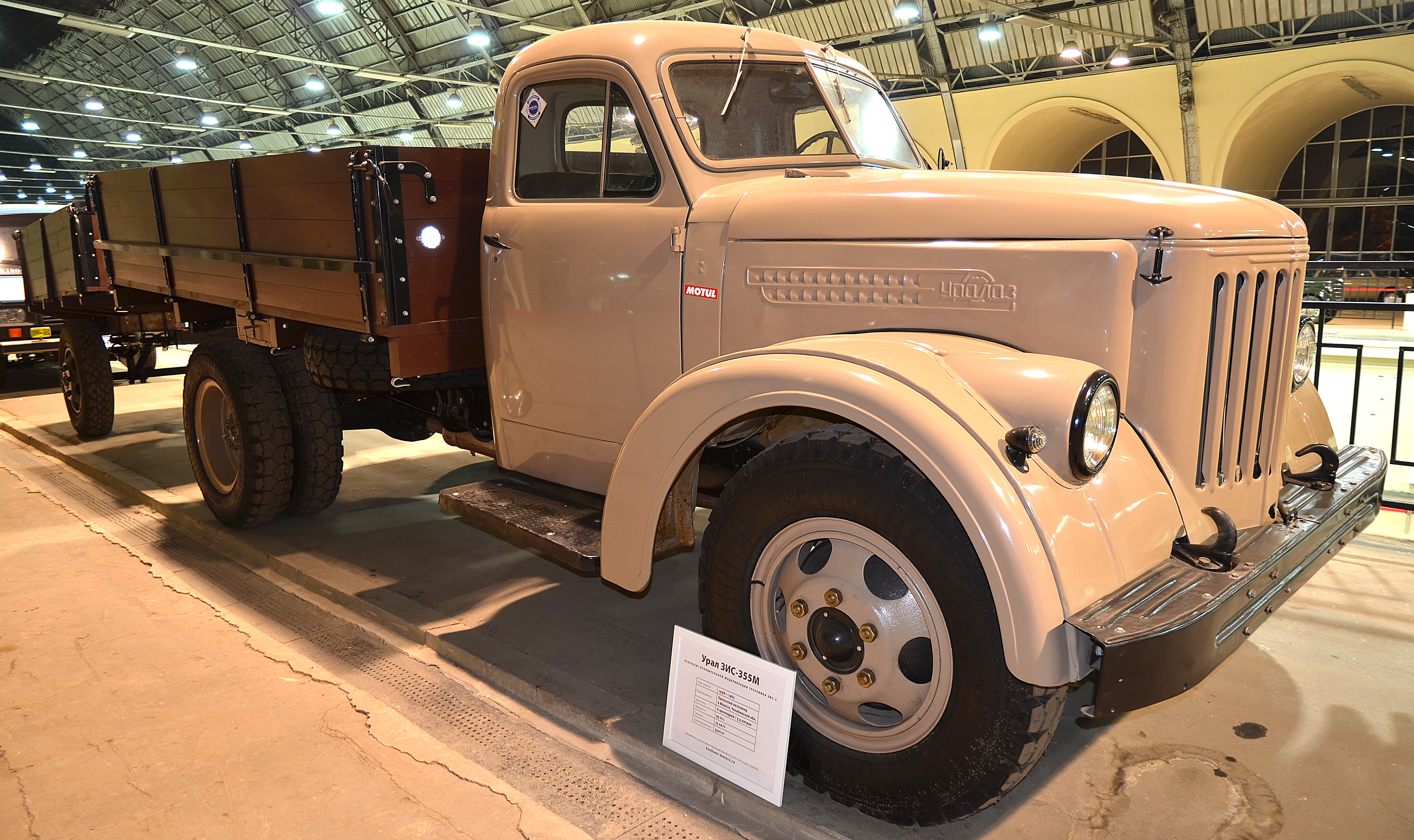
- UralZIS-355M in a Russian museum (2014)

Overview
- Manufacturer: Ural Automotive Plant
- Also called: Ural-355M (1961-1965)
- Production: 1957/58–1965
- Assembly: Russia: Miass

Body and chassis
- Class: Truck
- Layout: rear wheel drive

Powertrain
- Engine: 5.55 L УралЗИС-353А I6 gasoline
- Transmission: 4-speed manual

Chronology
- Predecessor: UralZIS-355
- Successor: Ural-375

The UralZIS-355M is a truck that was produced by Ural from 1957 or 1958 to 1965. The truck replaced several versions of the ZIS-5 that were produced by the manufacturer after World War II. It was replaced because the Ural-plant specialized in the production of heavy all-wheel-drive trucks like the Ural-375. From 1961 to 1965 the truck was named Ural-355M due to De-Stalinization.

== History ==
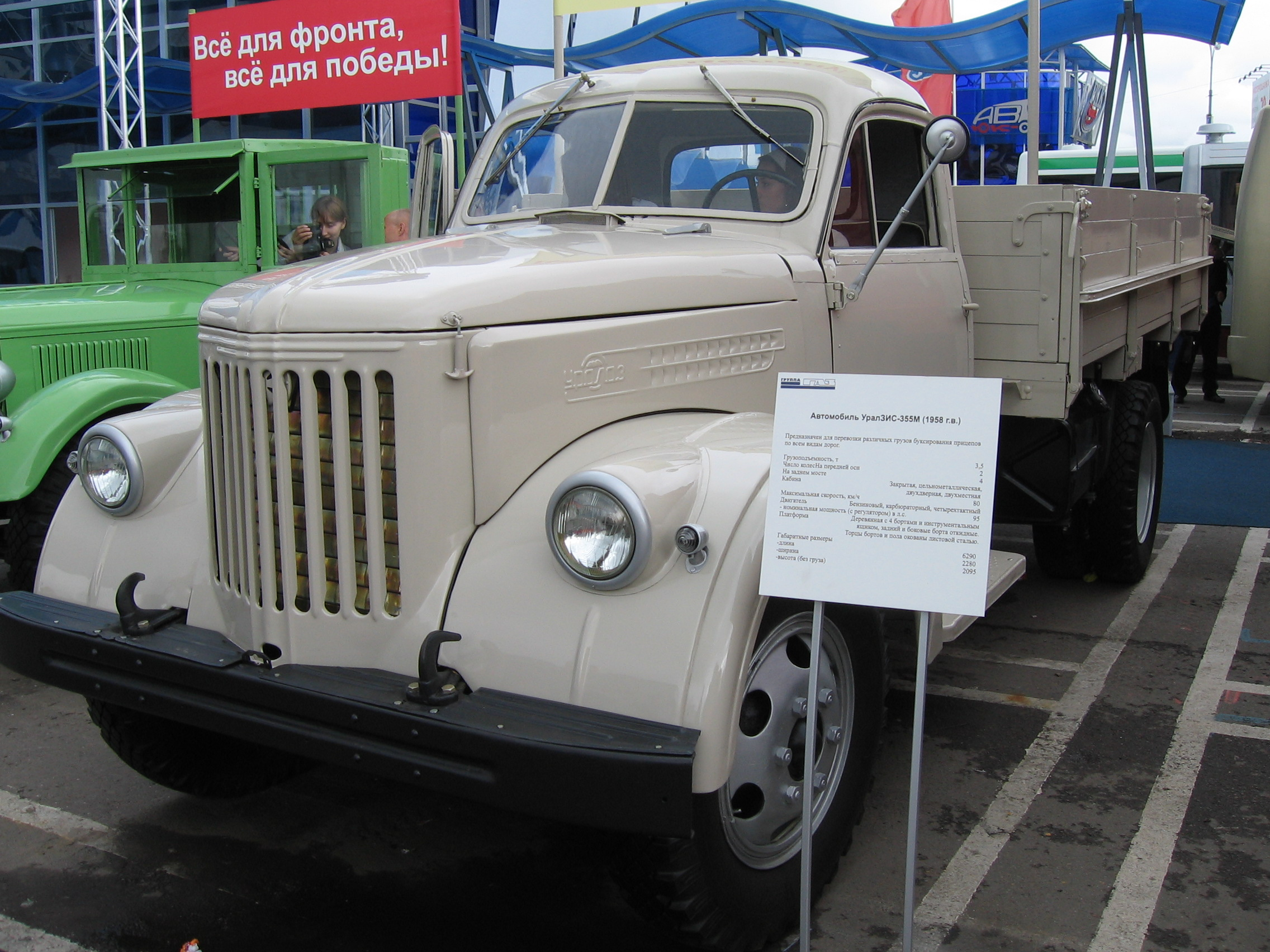
UralZIS-355M (built in 1958) at a Russian exhibition

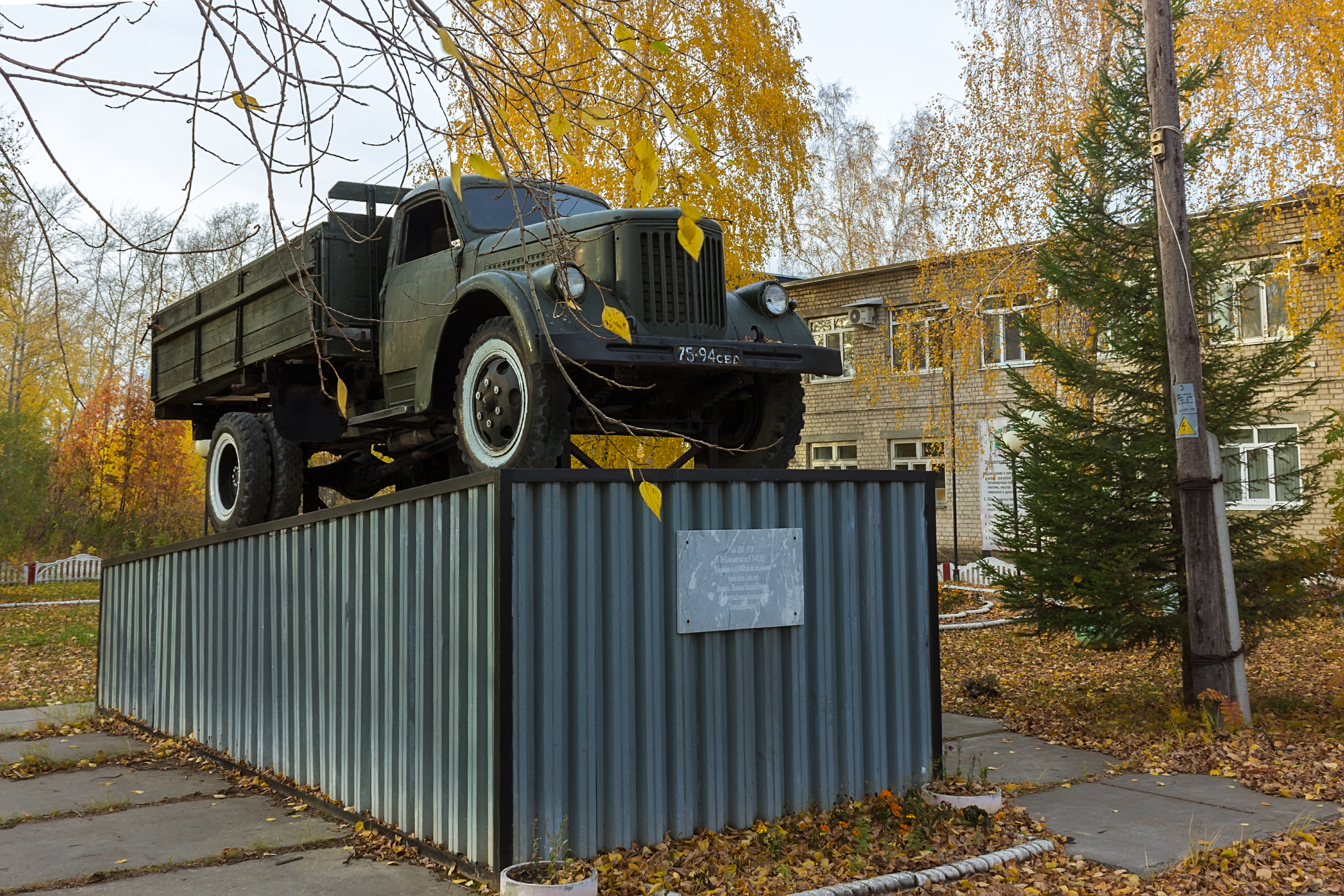
UralZIS-355M as a monument in Kamensk-Uralsky (2018)

The UralZIS plant in Miass was founded during the Second World War when the production of the ZIS plant in Moscow was relocated behind the Ural to be protected against attacks by the Germans. Mainly ZIS-5 trucks were built. However, the plant in Moscow was able to resume production a short time later. The production facility in Miass remained and was henceforth called UralZIS. The UralZIS-5 called trucks were produced here with minor technical changes until 1958. In the mid-1950s, the vehicles were renamed again to UralZIS-355 in accordance with the standardized numbering system for Soviet vehicles. It was not until the end of 1957 or the beginning of 1958 that major changes were made to the bodywork and the technology of the trucks and transferred to series production. The new vehicle was named UralZIS-355M, where the M stands for "modernized".

The UralZIS-355M was built in series until 1965. In 1961 the name was changed to Ural-355M to accommodate de-Stalinization. During the production time there were only minor technical changes. About 192,500 copies of the truck were built before production ceased. In the course of the increasing specialization of the Soviet auto industry, medium-weight trucks were primarily built in Zavod imeni Likhachyova in Moscow. The factory had previously built similar trucks like the ZIS-150 or the ZIL-164 in large numbers. Despite the large number of UralZIS-355Ms built, the truck is rare today. There are still a little over 20 copies known on the territory of the former Soviet Union.

The UralAZ plant (previously UralZIS), which was also renamed at the beginning of the 1960s, no longer built light trucks after production of the Ural-355M was discontinued. It specialized completely in the construction of all-terrain three-axle vehicles such as the Ural-375 and the Ural-4320, which is still in production today.

== Technical data ==
All data apply for the flatbed truck UralZIS-355M.

- engine: in-line six-cylinder four-stroke petrol engine
- engine type: УралЗИС-353А
- power: 70 kW
- displacement: 5550 cm^{3}
- maximum torque: 31.5 kpm (309 Nm)
- compression: 6:1
- tank capacity: 110 L
- fuel consumption: between 24 and 45 L/100 km, strongly dependent on the road surface and speed
- layout: 4×2

Dimensions and weights

- length: 6290 mm
- width: 2280 mm
- height: 2080 mm
- wheelbase: 3824 mm
- front track: 1611 mm
- rear track: 1675 mm
- ground clearance: 262 mm
- turning circle: 16.6 m
- tire size: 8.25-20"
- payload: 3500 kg
- empty weight: 3360 kg
- permissible total weight: 7050 kg
