= Lake Turgoyak =

Lake in Chelyabinsk Oblast, Russia

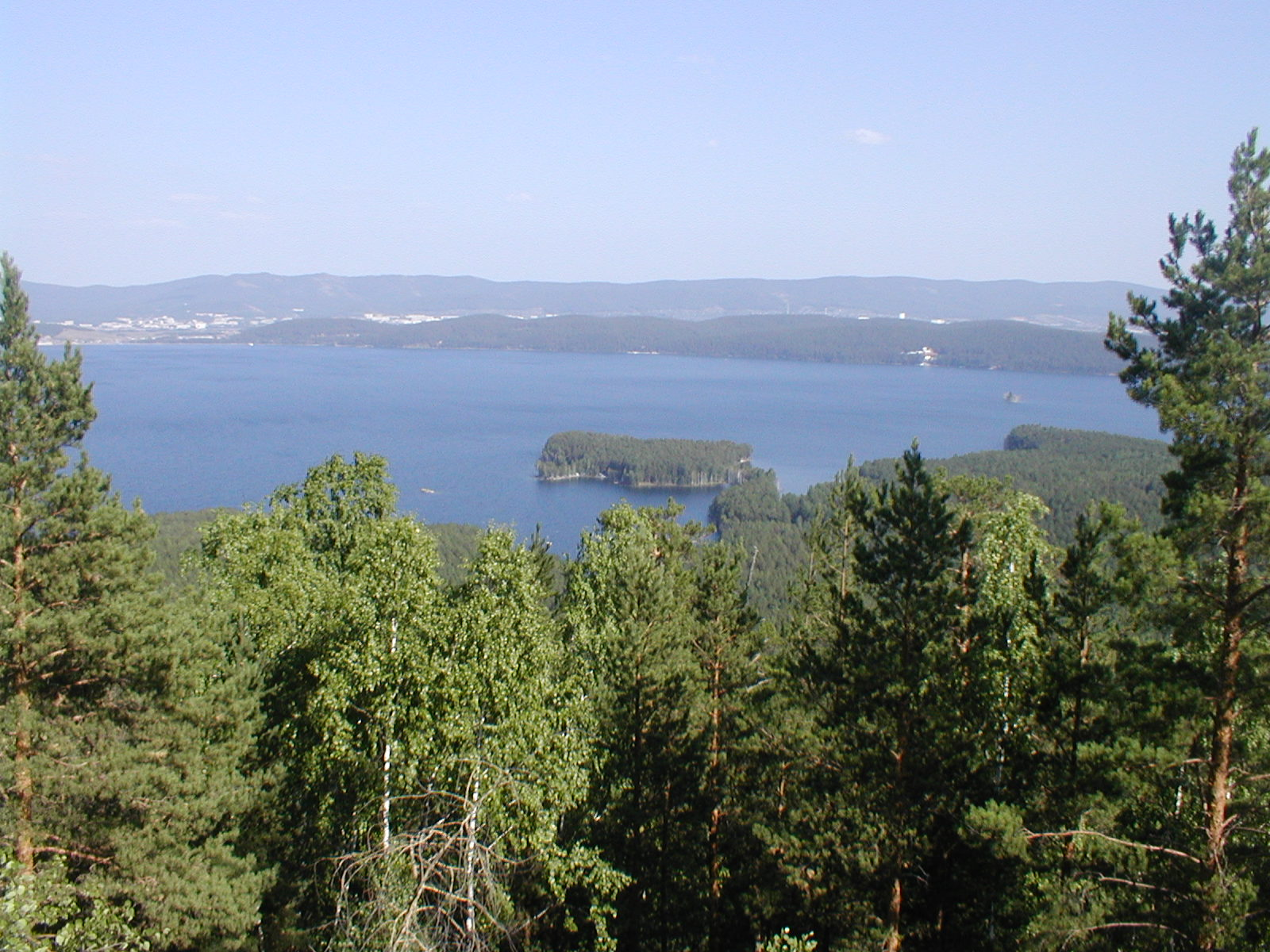

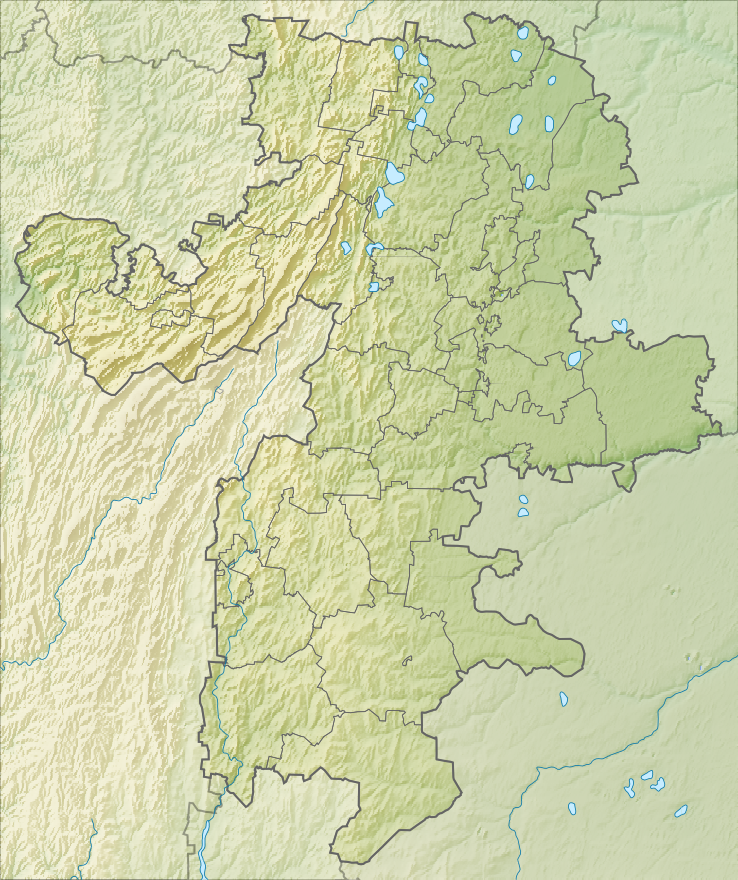
- Location within Chelyabinsk Oblast
- Location: Chelyabinsk Oblast
- Coordinates: 55°09′N 60°04′E
- Basin countries: Russia
- Max. length: 6.9 km (4.3 mi)
- Max. width: 6.2 km (3.9 mi)
- Surface area: 26.38 km^{2} (10.19 sq mi)
- Average depth: 19.2 m (63 ft)
- Max. depth: 34 m (112 ft)
- Shore length^{1}: 27 km (17 mi)
- Surface elevation: 320 m (1,050 ft)
- Frozen: 0
- Islands: 6
- Sections/sub-basins: 1
- Settlements: 2
- ^{1} Shore length is not a well-defined measure.

Turgoyak (Russian: Тургояк) is a lake in Chelyabinsk Oblast, near the city of Miass, Russia. It has a surface of 2638 hectares. The water of the lake has a great transparency (from 10-17.5 m). The quality of the water is comparable to that of Lake Baikal.

A megalithic monument is found on an island in the lake (Vera island), as well as ruins of a monastery.

The lake is a popular tourist destination with resorts and holiday camps.

== Gallery ==
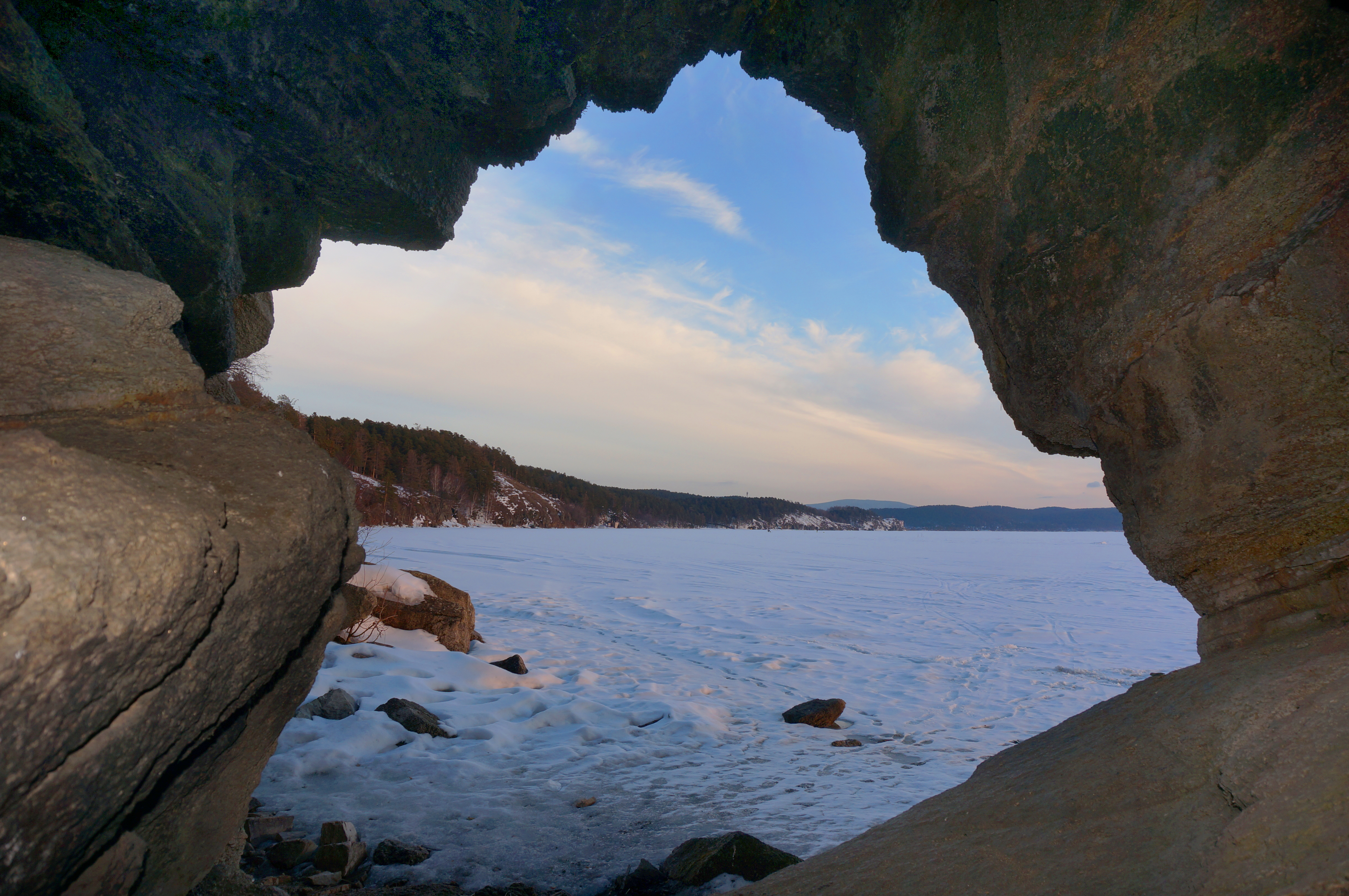

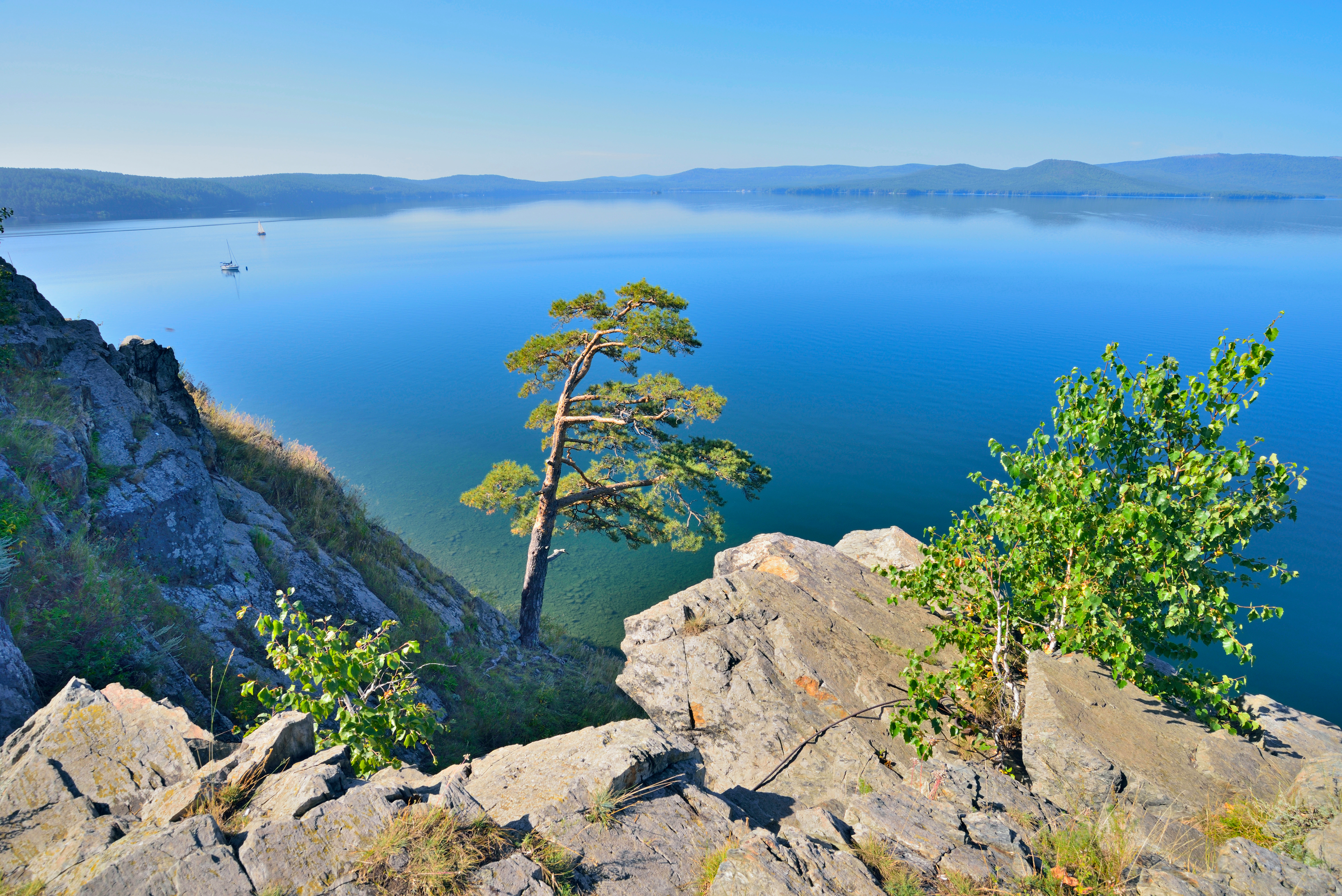
