= Ural Automotive Plant =

Russian truck manufacturing company

Coordinates: 55.0925°N 60.1248°E

UralAZ
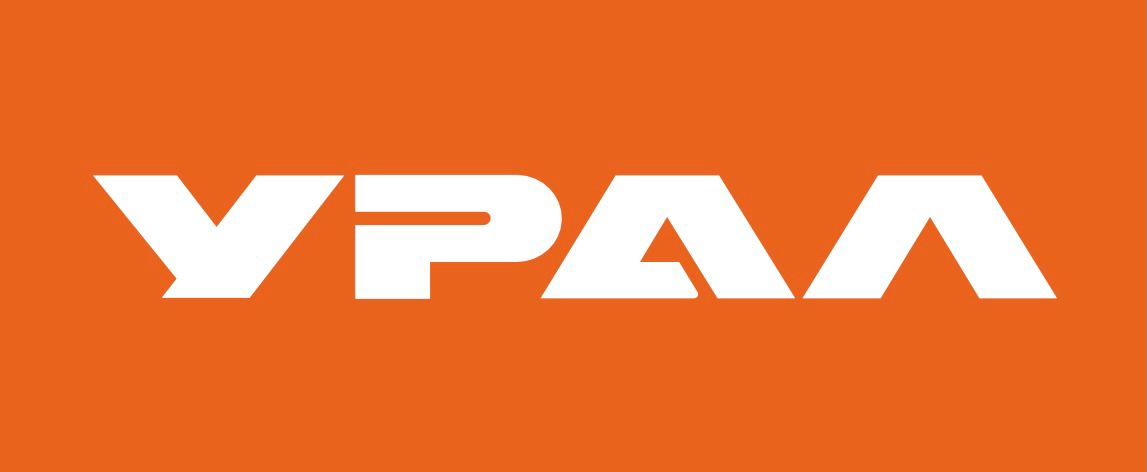
- UralAZ company logo
- Native name: АО "Автомобильный завод "Урал"
- Formerly: Уральский автомобильный завод имени Сталина
- Company type: Open joint-stock company
- Industry: Automotive
- Founded: 1941; 85 years ago
- Headquarters: Miass, Chelyabinsk Oblast, Russia
- Products: Automobiles
- Revenue: RUB19.792 billion (2011)
- Net income: RUB415 million (2011)
- Number of employees: 4 000 (2018)
- Parent: UMG
- Website: uralaz.ru Auditor: PLC FinExpertiza (2007)

The Urals Automotive Plant, an Open Stock Company, (Russian: Ура́льский автомоби́льный заво́д, УралАЗ; translit. Uralskiy Avtomobilnyi Zavod, UralAZ) is a major Russian manufacturer of off-road trucks under the Ural (Cyrillic: "Урал") brand. Located in the city of Miass, Chelyabinsk Oblast in the Ural Mountains. The plant was established in 1941; when the ZiS truck plant was evacuated from Moscow during World War II.

== History ==
=== Early history ===
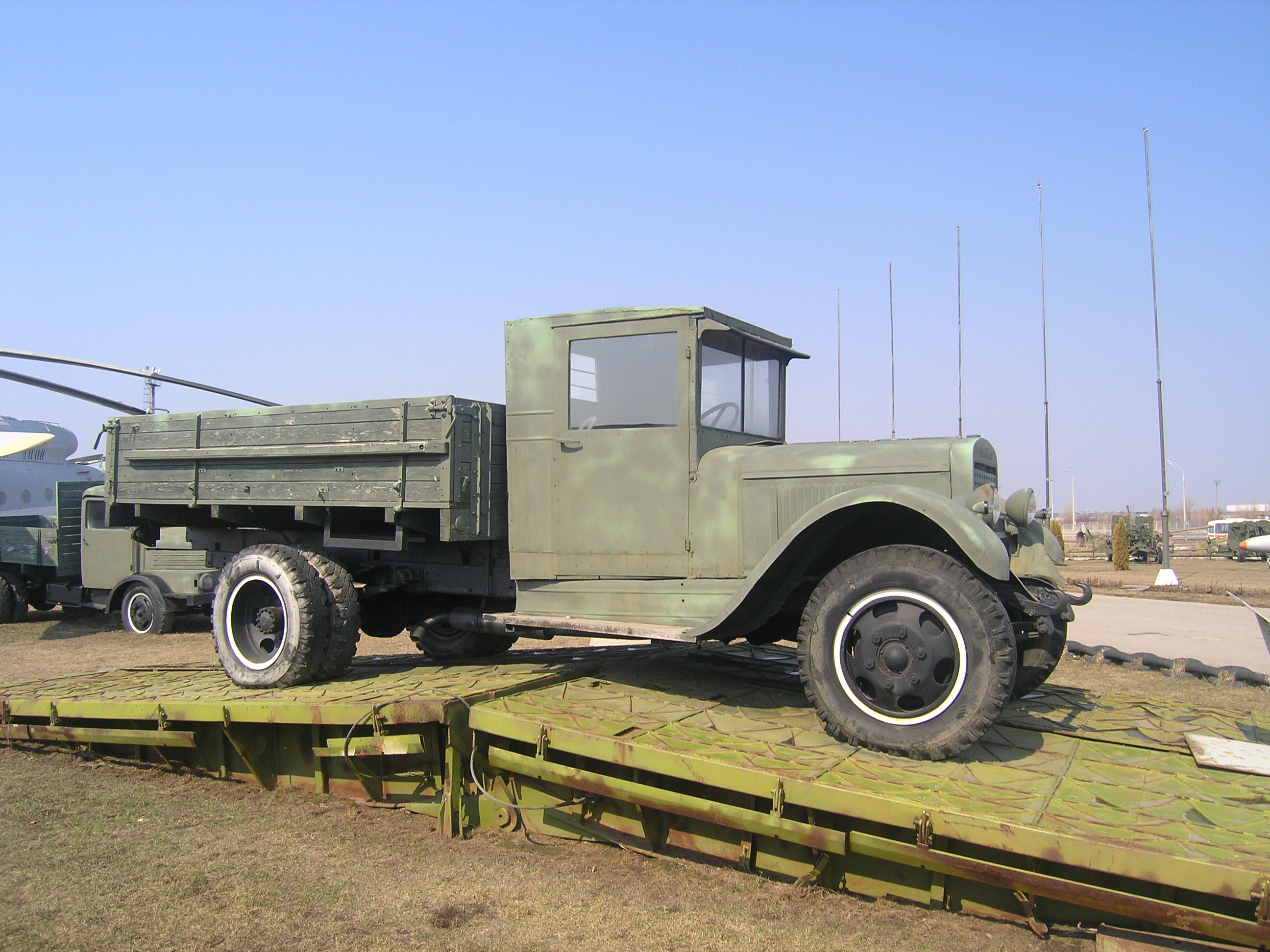
UralZIS-produced ZIS-5 in Togliatti Technical Museum

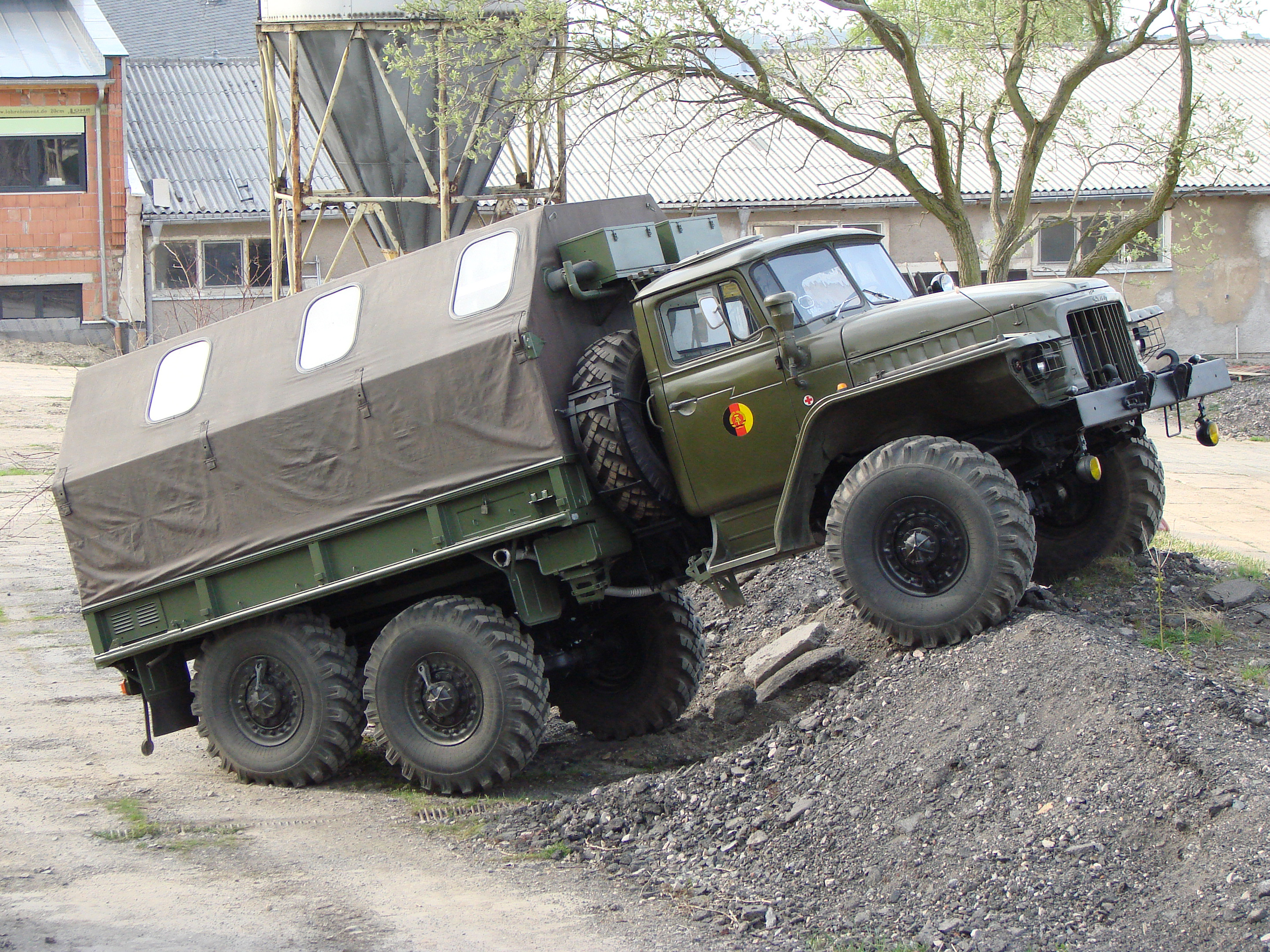
East German Army Ural-375

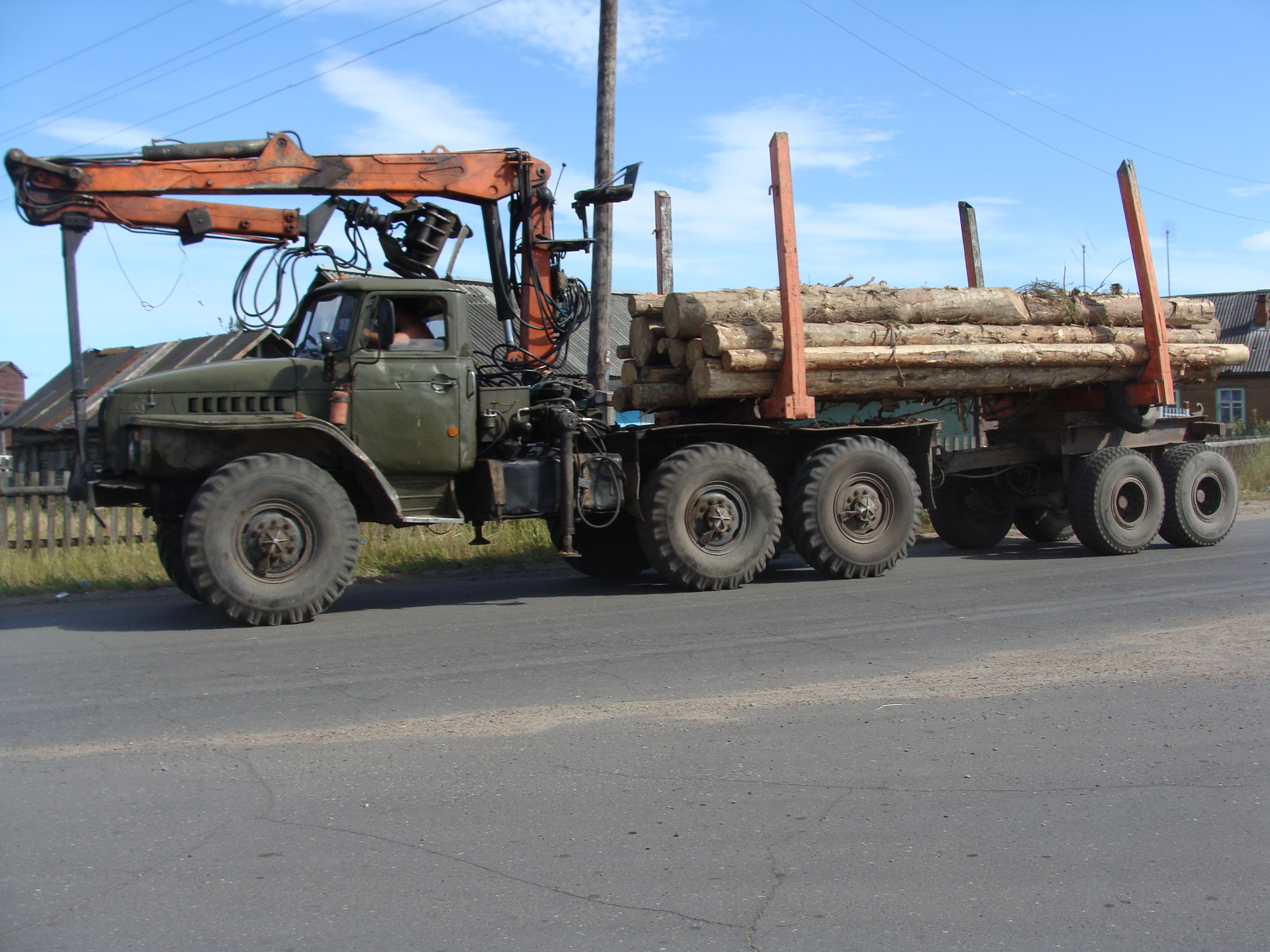
A Ural-4320

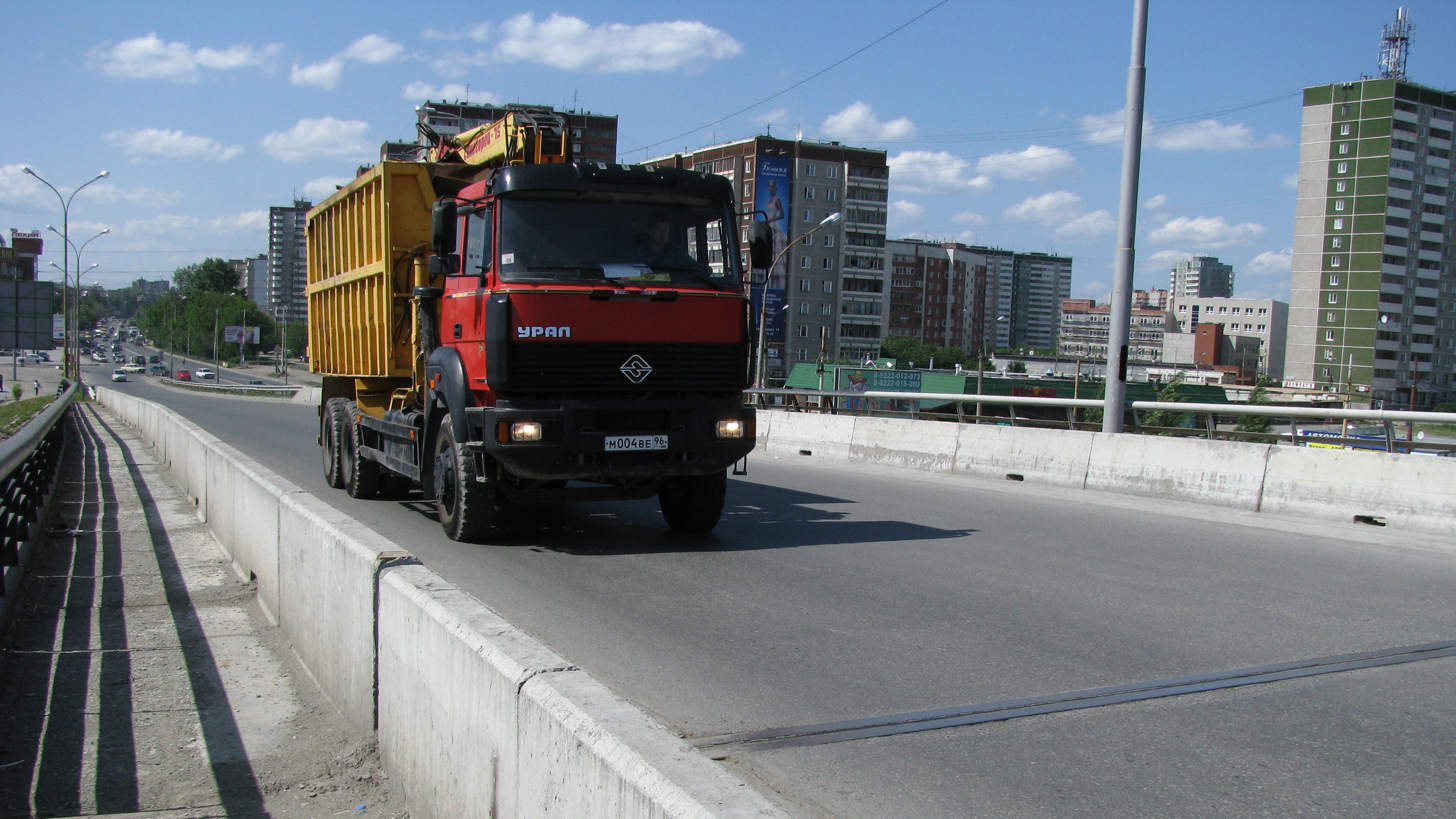
Ural-6361

In the autumn of 1941, Soviet leaders decided to build a plant for the manufacturing of military trucks, and it was named Ural Automotive Plant.

Since April 1942, the factory has produced primarily engines and gearboxes. On July 8, 1944, the first truck ZIS-5V was built under the brand UralZIS. The new factory became the Ural branch of ZIS UralZIS. At the End of World War II in Europe, the ZIS-5 was considered simple and robust, and thus remained in production for many years. It was not until 1947 that the factory started to manufacture updated models.

In 1946, the production version of the ZIS-21A 2.5 t began fabrication. The truck was produced under the brand UralZIS-352. In 1949, the 5th version of UralZIS was equipped with hydraulic brakes.

A new model, the UralZIS-355, was released in 1956. However, in 1958, the new version of the ZIS-5 was taken in production under the designation UralZIS-355M and remained in production until 1965.

The Scientific Institute of Automotive Standardization of Moscow had been working on a new SUV. Production of this type of truck had been assigned to the Ural factory – UralAZ – who got the brand new Ural. The factory had been rebuilt since 1961 and production of the Ural-375 (6×6) 5 t for the army was intensified. For this truck, a new engine was developed.

The 1960s were a period of great success for the brand UralAZ which won, for its quality products in large quantities, the Order of the Red Banner of Labour. UralAZ celebrated the total production of 530,000 trucks and 1.3 mln engines. In 1972 and 1975 the two 6×4 trucks Ural-375N and Ural-377N appeared. The manufacture of 6×4 versions continued until 1983.

In 1977, a new 5-tonne truck Ural-4320 was created. ZIL petrol engine was replaced by the KamAZ-740 V8 diesel engine (10852 cm^{3}, 210 HP).

In 1987, UralAZ celebrated its millionth truck. Governmental industry reorganization and economic reforms forced UralAZ to become a private limited company and turn to the production of civilian vehicles. The models Ural-43204 and Ural-55571 emerged due to this.

Since June 1992 production of 6 t truck Ural-4322 (6×6) started with a new more contemporary cabin. It was equipped with the Ural-744 air cooled V8 engine with an output of 234 HP, diesel Kustanay (KDZ), a manufacturer of Deutz engines under license.

A fire occurred in the spring of 1993 at the KamAZ engine plant that seriously disrupted production. As a result, the company had to look for engine suppliers.

UralAZ was traditionally oriented only to Russian companies, but began a collaboration with the Italian manufacturer Iveco in 1992 (see "Iveco-UralAZ collaboration"). The first result of this joint venture model was presented in May of that year, which was the UralAZ-330-18t Iveco 30ANW (6×6) with a 306 HP, air-cooled diesel engine and its Iveco chassis being imported.

The creation of the UralAZ Iveco joint venture in 1994 allowed the small series production of the range of previously imported heavy trucks. The production of advanced Iveco cabins began in 1997.

UralAZ, like all Russian manufacturers, traditionally maintains a wide range of military permanent all-wheel drive off-road vehicles. Besides the military versions of Ural-43206 trucks (4×4) and Ural-4320-31 (6×6), UralAZ continuous production of 9 t trucks Ural-5323 (8×8).

Since 1997, military vehicles also provide the basis for civilian versions – universal frame of 15 t Ural-53236 for the installation of special equipment. The truck Ural-5323-22 (8×8) has cabins and advanced Iveco engine with two berths.

That same year the Ural-6301 chassis (6×6) with the same cabin was presented with a payload of 10 t. As desired by the buyer, it is possible to install a V6 diesel engine Deutz liquid cooled with a capacity of 272 HP.

Currently, the future of UralAZ is closely related to the creation of new models. UralAZ has a production capacity of 30,000 trucks. Dependent of the evolution of the Russian market, production was reduced to 7,000, then to 5,400. In 1998, UralAZ sold only 2,489 chassis and the factory filed for bankruptcy.

=== Iveco-UralAZ collaboration ===
Collaboration between UralAZ and Iveco began in 1992. In May the first result of joint activity was represented: the Iveco UralAZ 330-30ANW (6×6) with a gross weight of 33.5 ton. It has a diesel air-cooled 306 hp V8 engine Deutz. The vehicle was designed for arctic climate that could reach up to -55 °C. The contribution of the Russian partner has been limited. The new vehicle replaces the Magirus-Deutz-2900-26K, developed in the 70s under the brand IVECO-Magirus and whose production was stopped in Europe many years ago. This became the basis of the production range of the new joint venture.

Iveco-UralAZ formed in late 1994 with a production capacity of 3,600 vehicles per year. All production features badge IVECO-UralAZ on the front grille. However, in the technical press Russian vehicles are frequently called Ural-Iveco. The first truck is the cab-IVECO-UralAZ 5531, closely derived from the Iveco 330. Its composition allows for a road train of 60 t, as well as the tractor-trailer and truck 55311 6×4 or 6×6.

In 1997, a new cab appeared called the 6329, it had several standard sizes EuroTrakker. It replaced the old cab Fiat VI. The cabin is further forward on the chassis. The short version of the car is used on trucks and semitrailer truck for local transport. The 63291 has the main tractor cabin with two berths. The PTR of the entire road is 56 t with a maximum speed of 103 km/h. Annual production was increased to 9000. IVECO EuroTech is no longer manufactured in Western Europe. In 2008, the ownership structure evolved and Iveco became the majority owner. The General Meeting of April 7, 2009 decided to name the new company "Iveco-UralAZ" (Ru:Уралаз-Ивеко) which was renamed Iveco-AMT (Ru:Ивеко-АМТ) on April 16, 2009.

Iveco-AMT introduced brand new trucks named Iveco Trakker. "AMT" means: Automobile / HAI M / Turin. This is based on the locations of the two plants. The assembly is performed in the city of Miass, Chelyabinsk region, and component production takes place in Turin.

=== Modern history ===
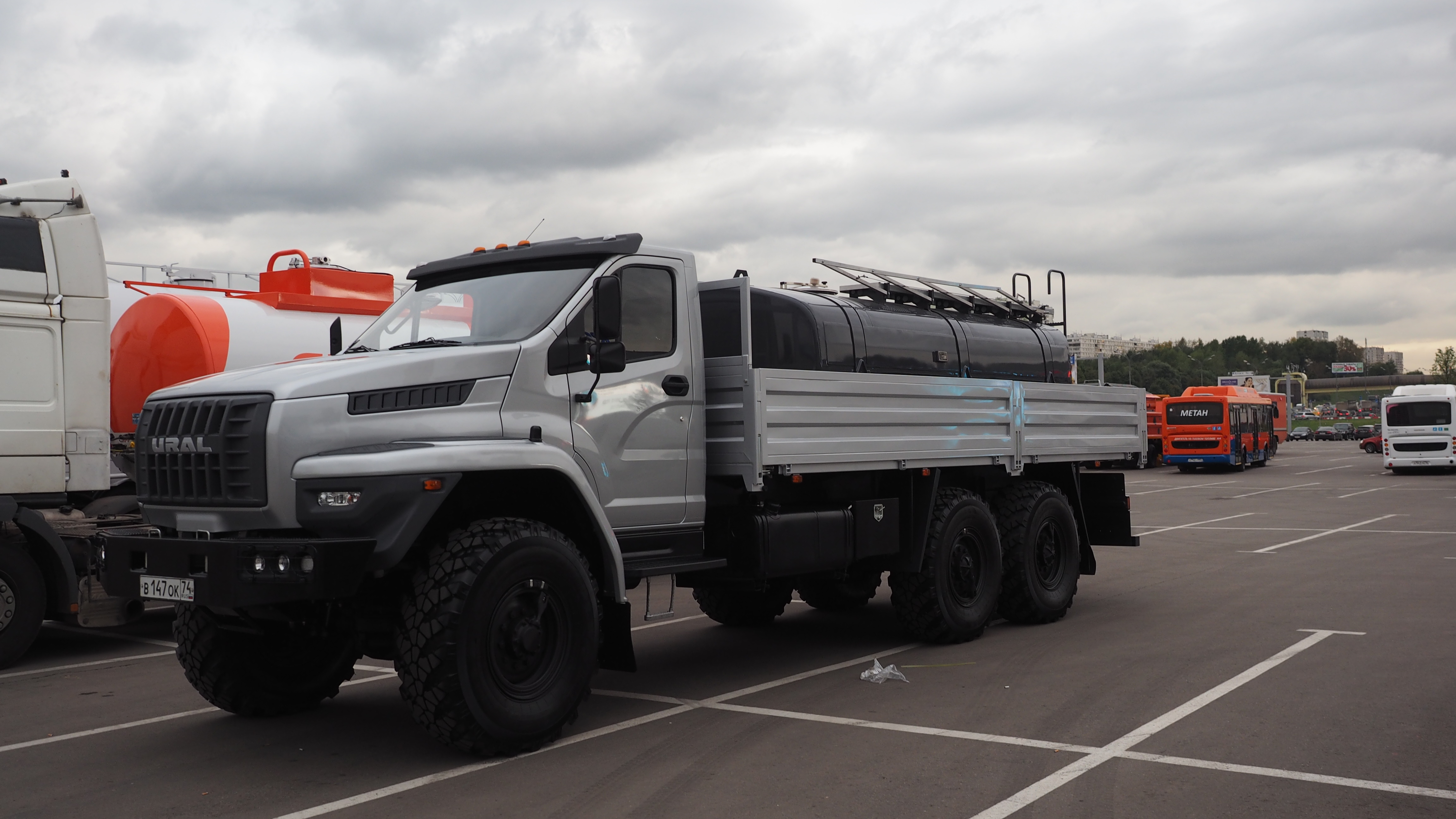
Ural NEXT

In 2015 production of a brand new truck began, the cabin of the new Ural Next unified with GAZ Gazelle NEXT LCV. The engine has increased power (312 hp). AWD system management became electro-pneumatic push-button. The lighting equipment uses LEDs. The instrument panel is an LCD, and there is the USB-port. The basic package includes: electric power windows, central door lock with remote control, audio system with control buttons on the steering wheel, exterior mirrors with heating, air suspended driver's seat, heated fuel filter and fuel in-line, adjustable height steering wheel, and on-board computer. Additional optional equipment includes ABS, air conditioning, locking of differential, auxiliary fuel tank, engine block heater, and a set of door pockets.

== Ural New SUV ==
In 2023 the Ural company will consider the option of starting the production of cars. This is what the Urals can use, which will release its own car in a short time - it will be the first SUV for the company from Miass called the Ural New 2022–2023.

== Gallery ==
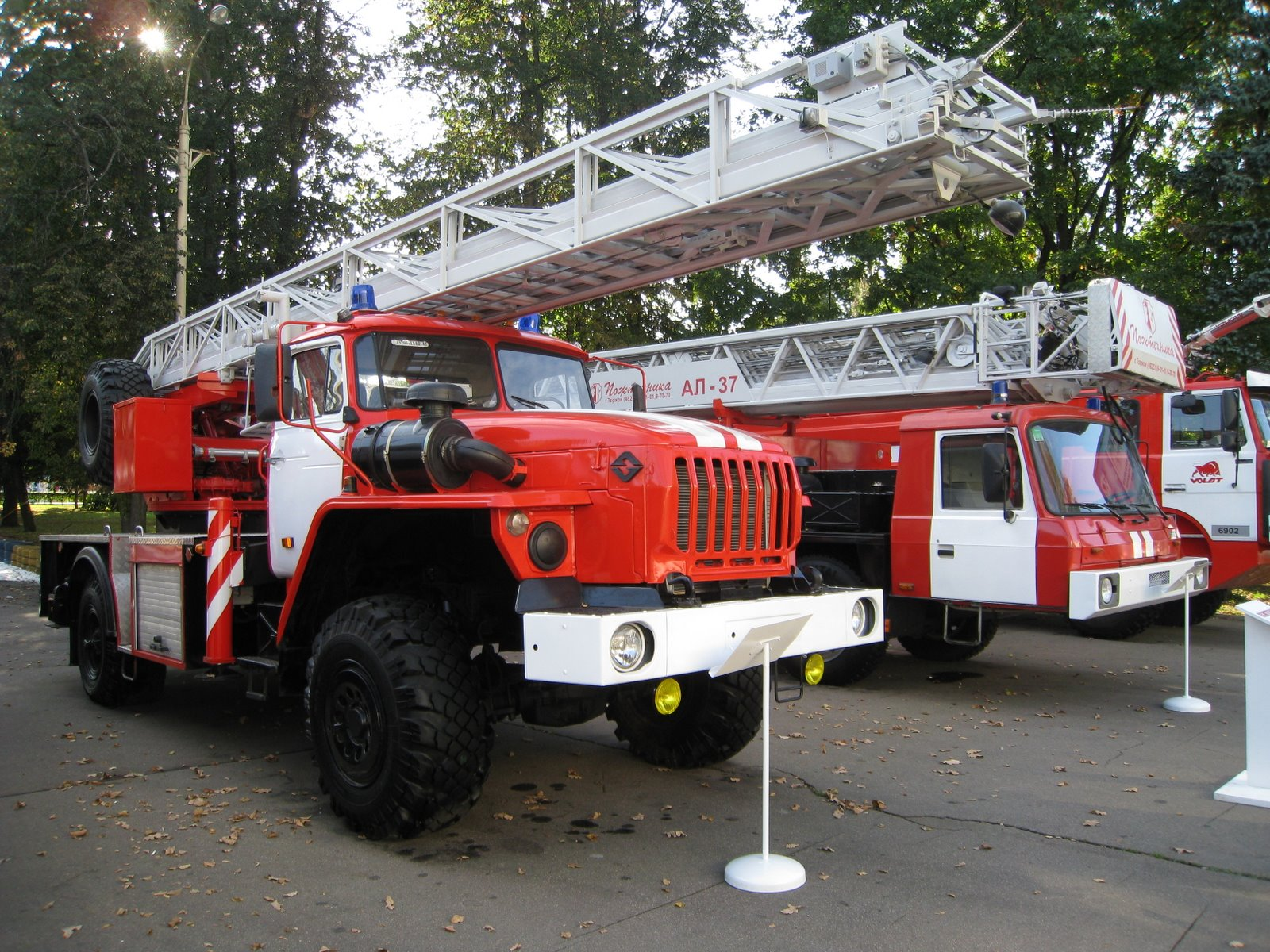
Ural firetruck

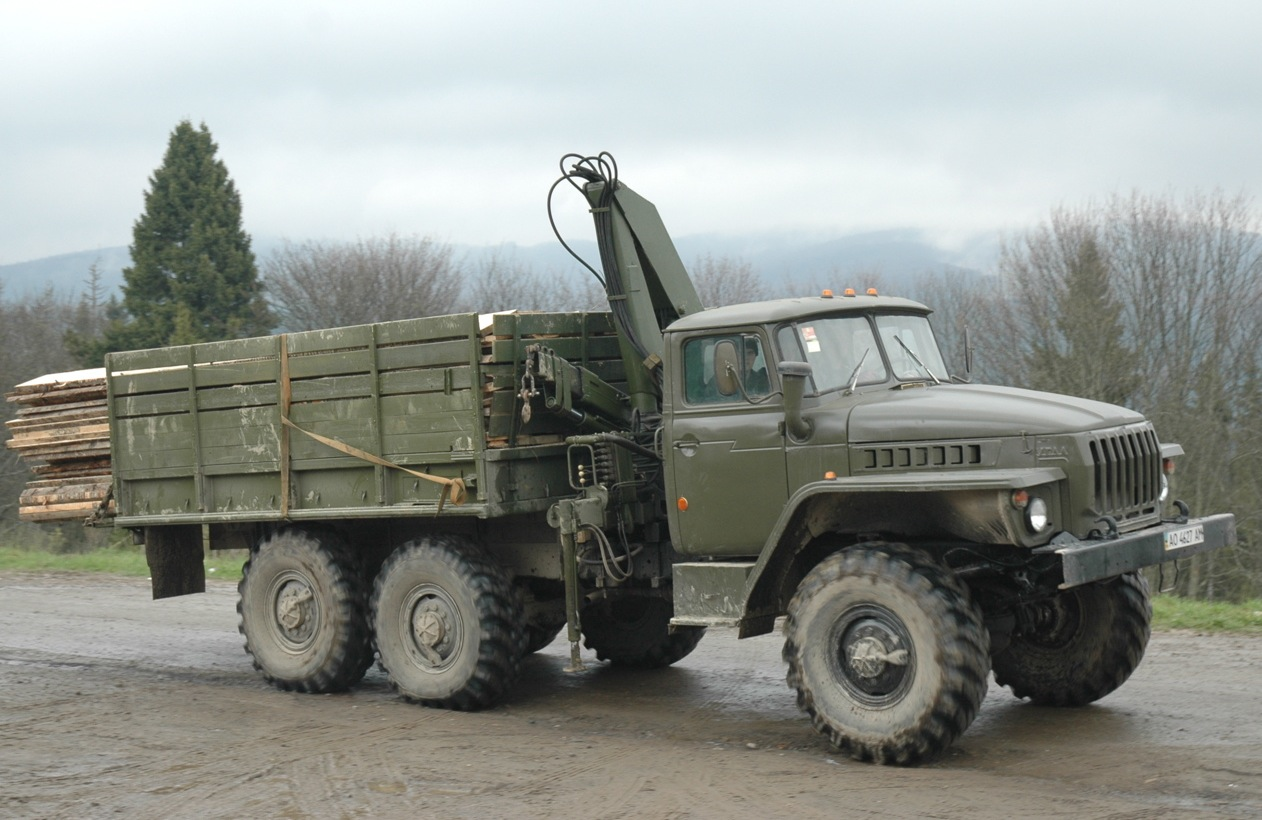
Ural-4320

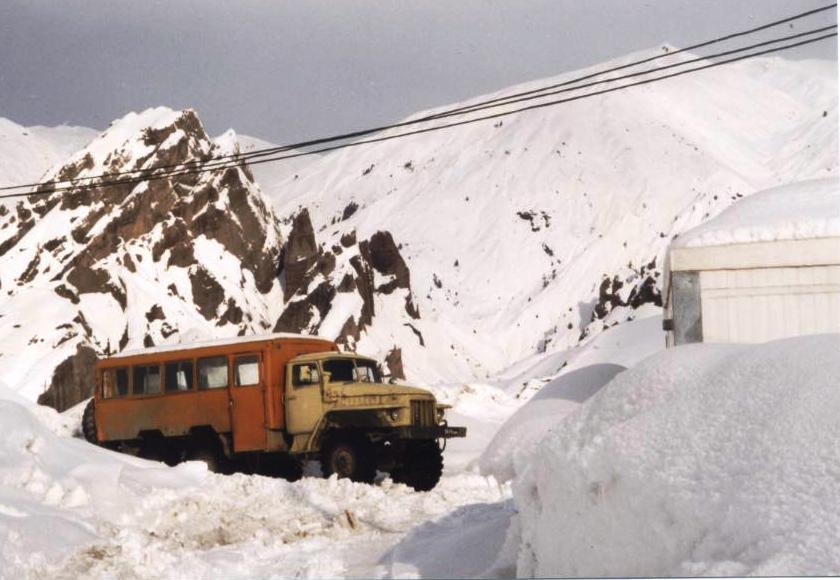
Ural-375D truckbus in Tajikistan

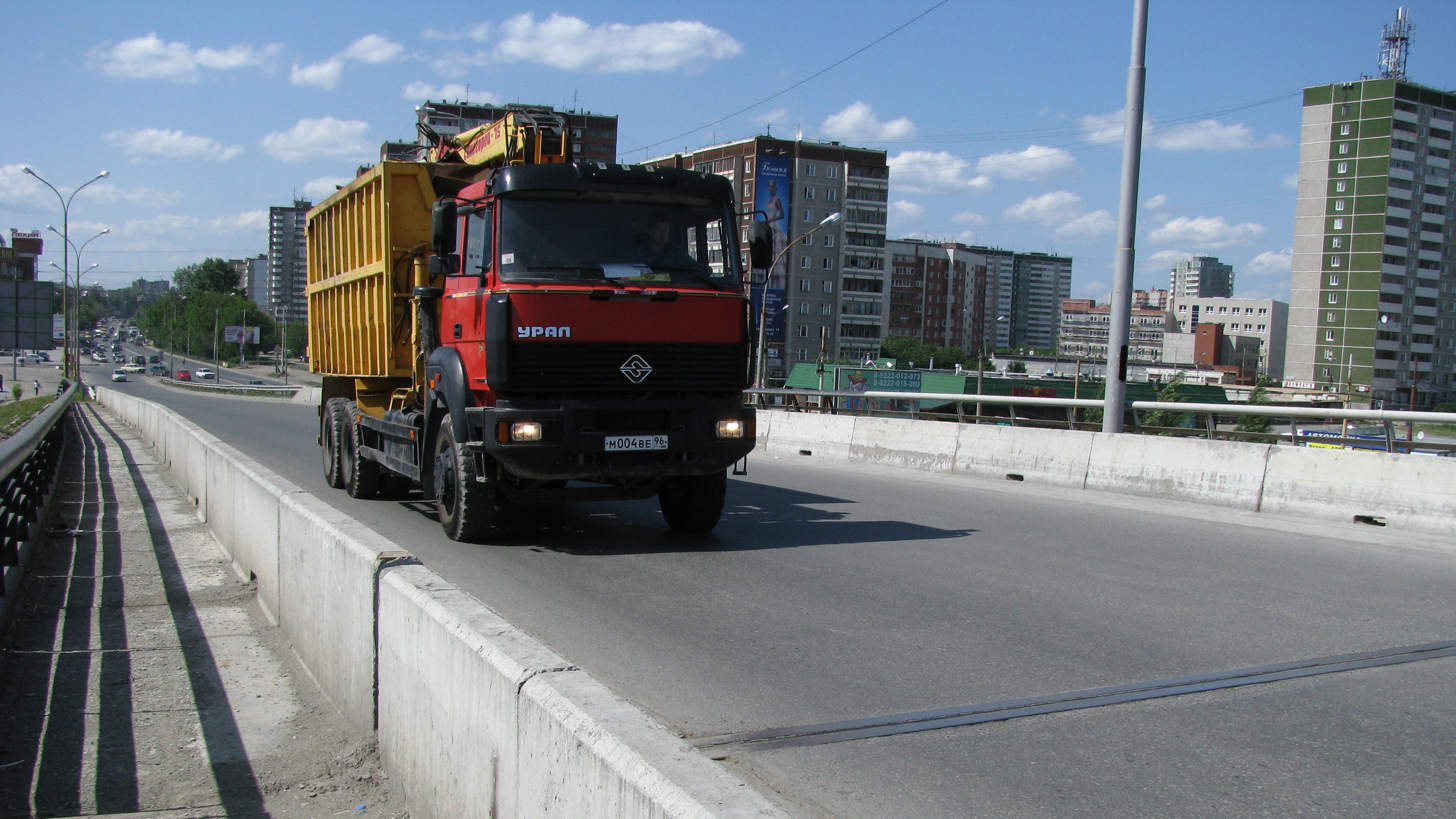
Ural-6361 in Yekaterinburg

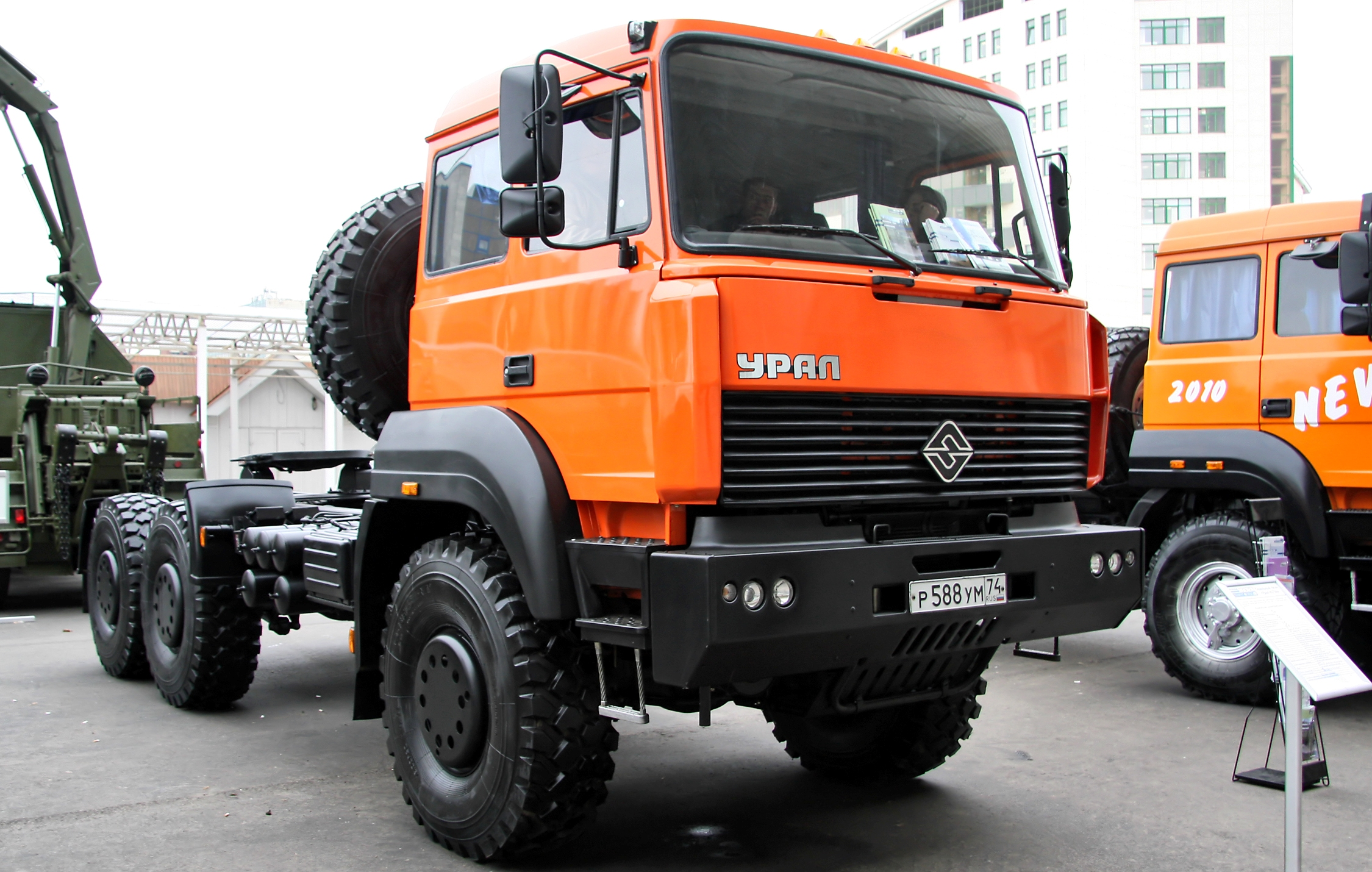
Ural-63704

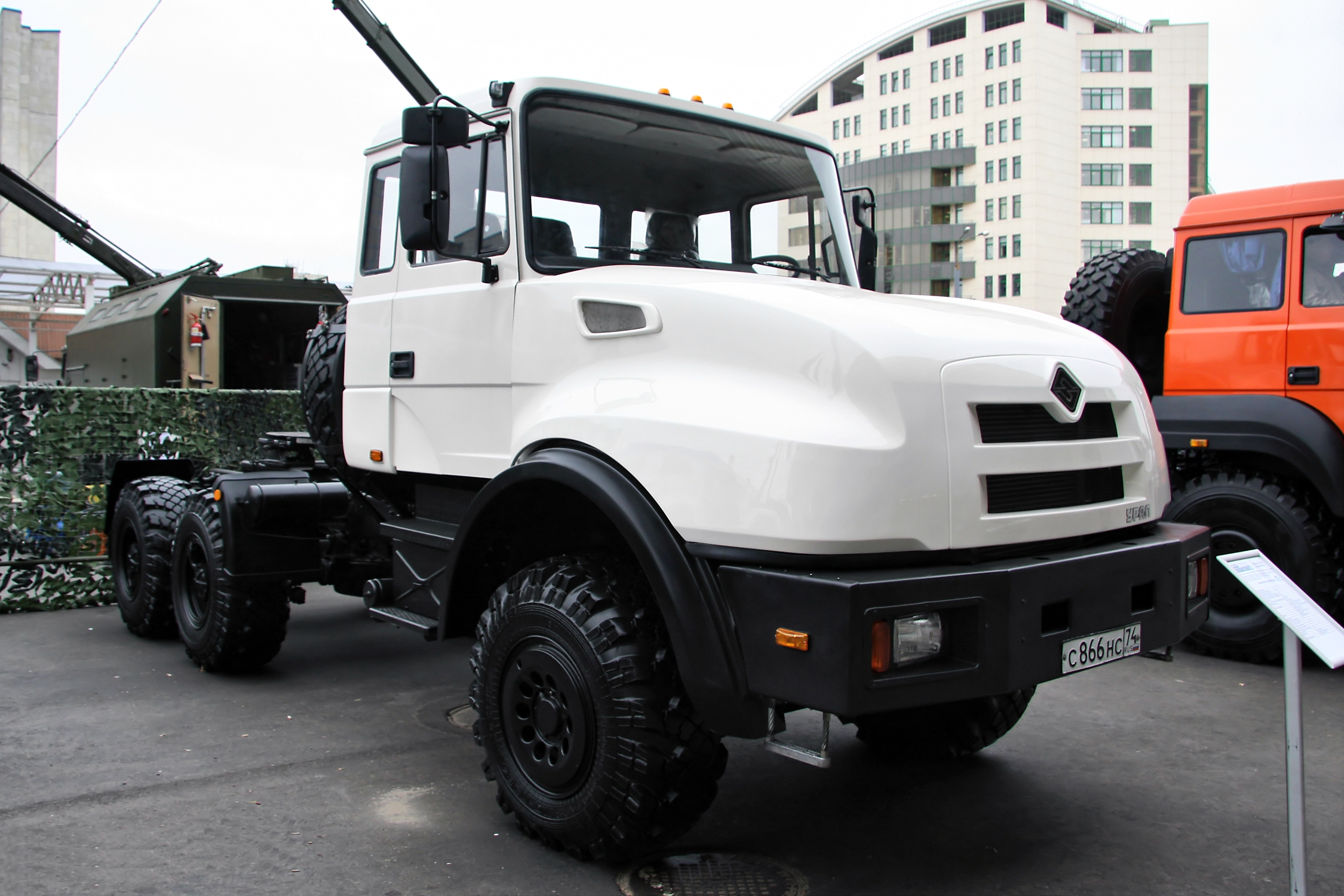
Ural-44202-59

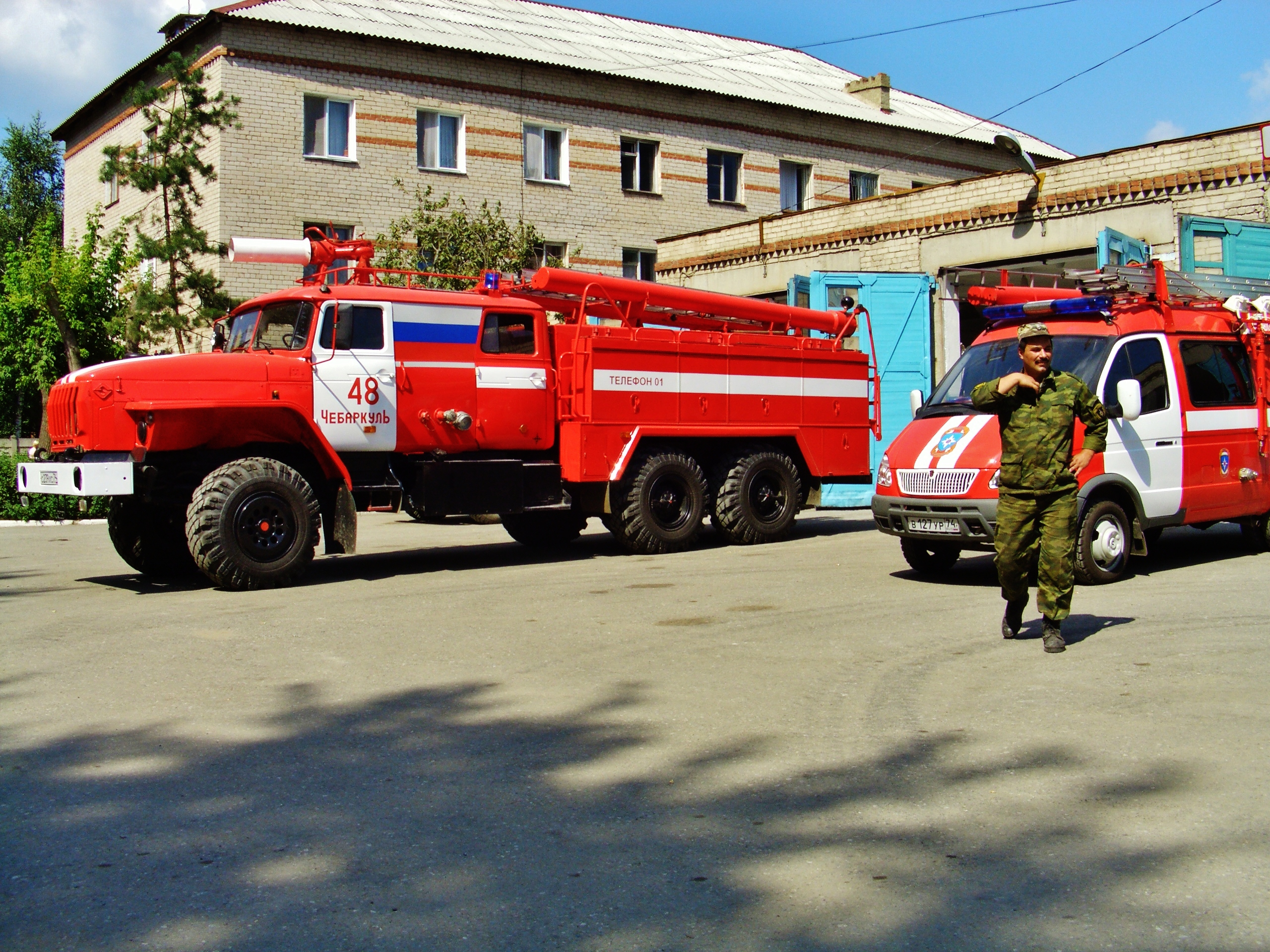
Ural fire engine

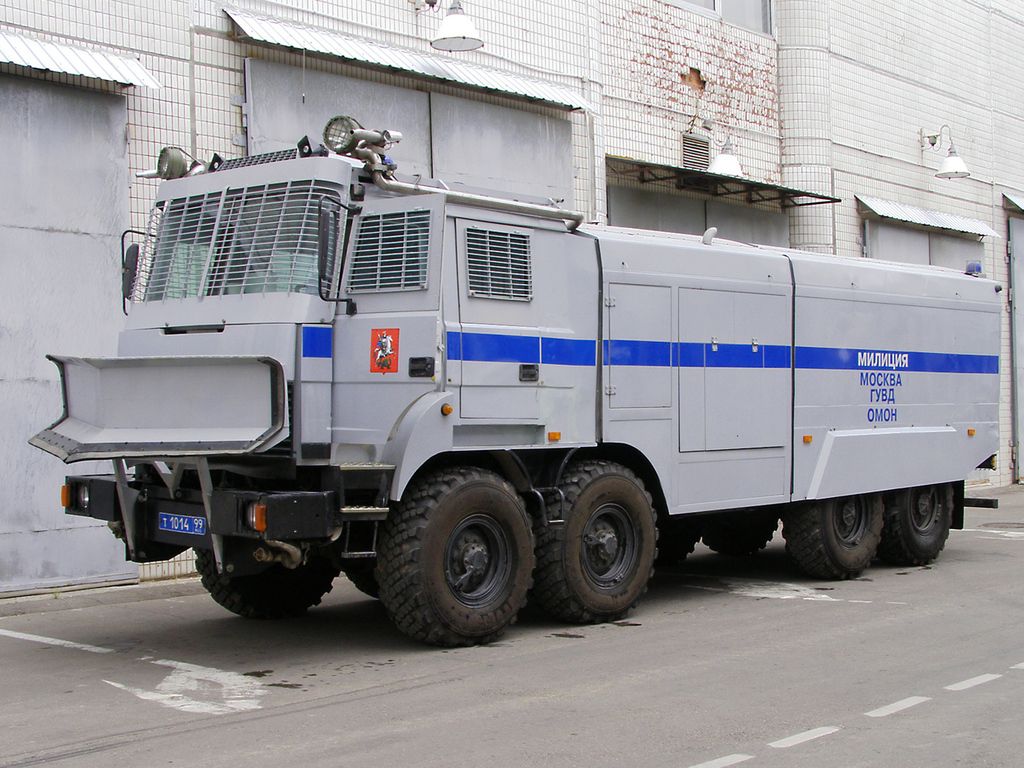
OMON police riot control water cannon vehicle "Lavina-Uragan" on Ural-532362

== Products ==
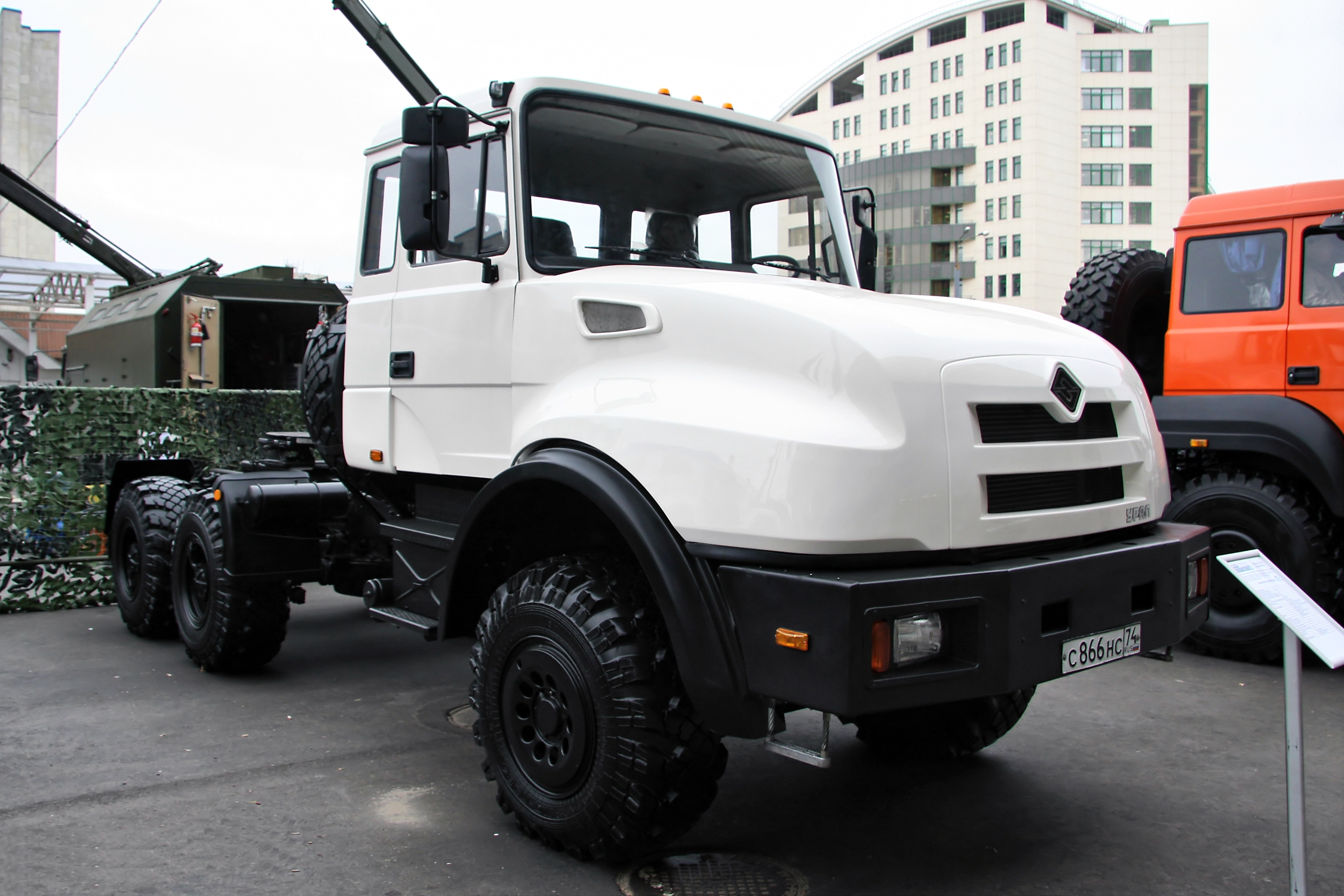
Ural-44202-59 truck

UralAZ produces the following series of trucks:

=== Onboard ===
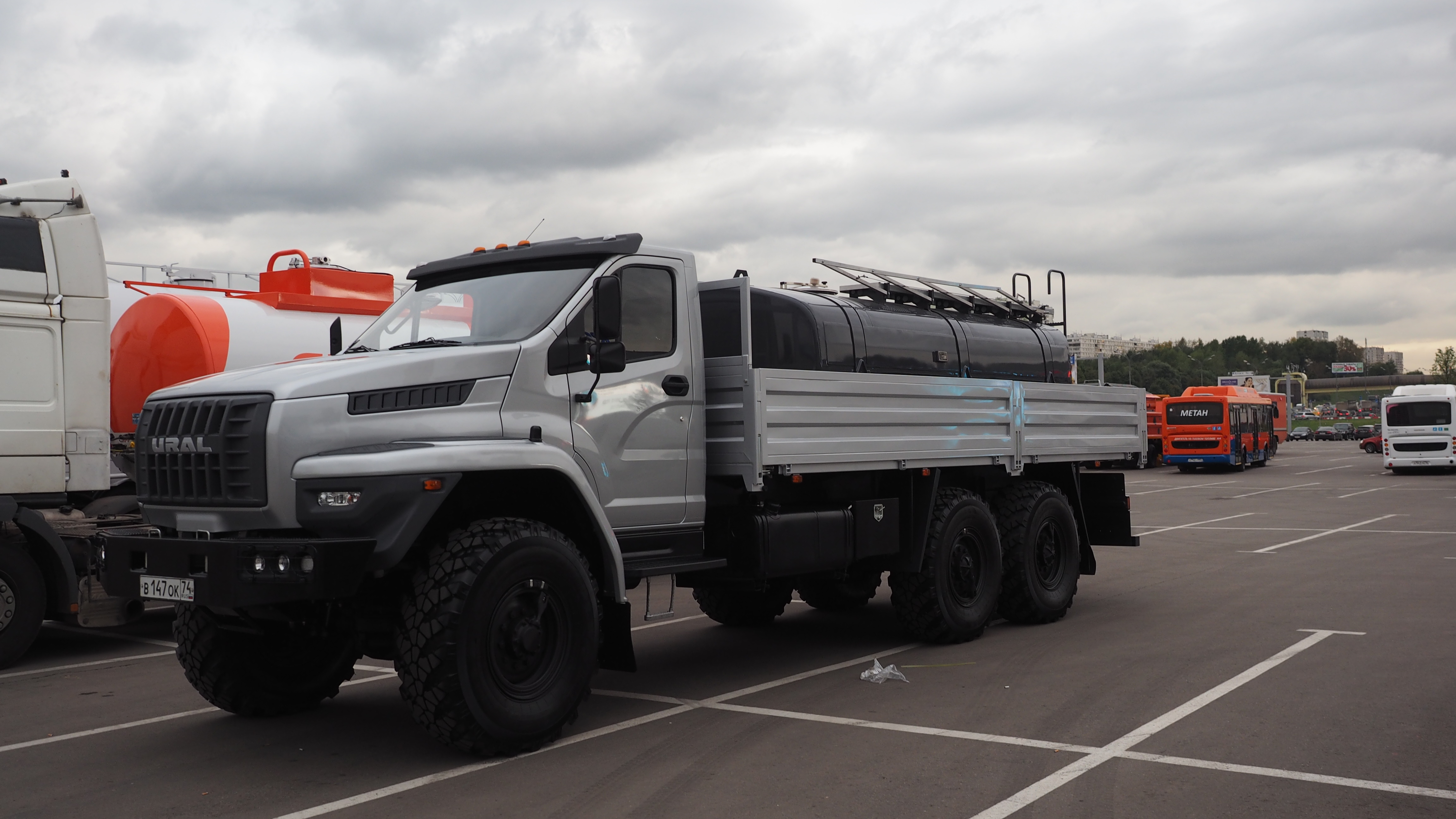
Ural Next

- Ural-4320
- Ural-4320-3951-58 with the CMU
- Ural-4320-3111-78
- Ural-4320-3951-58
- Ural Next (since 2015)

Tractors

- Ural-63674
- Ural-6470
- Ural-6464

=== Haulers ===
- Ural-5557 (November 1983)
- Ural-55571
- Ural-63685-0110-03
- Ural-583134
- Ural-583109 (6×4, 20 tons, 12 m^{3})
- Ural-65514 (6×4, 19.3 tons, 15 m^{3})
- Ural-65541-10 (6×4, 20.1 ton-tipping)
- Ural-583106 (8×4, 25 tons, 16 m^{3})
- Ural-65515 (8×4, 23.4 tons, 13 m^{3})
- Ural Next (since 2015)

=== Passenger ===
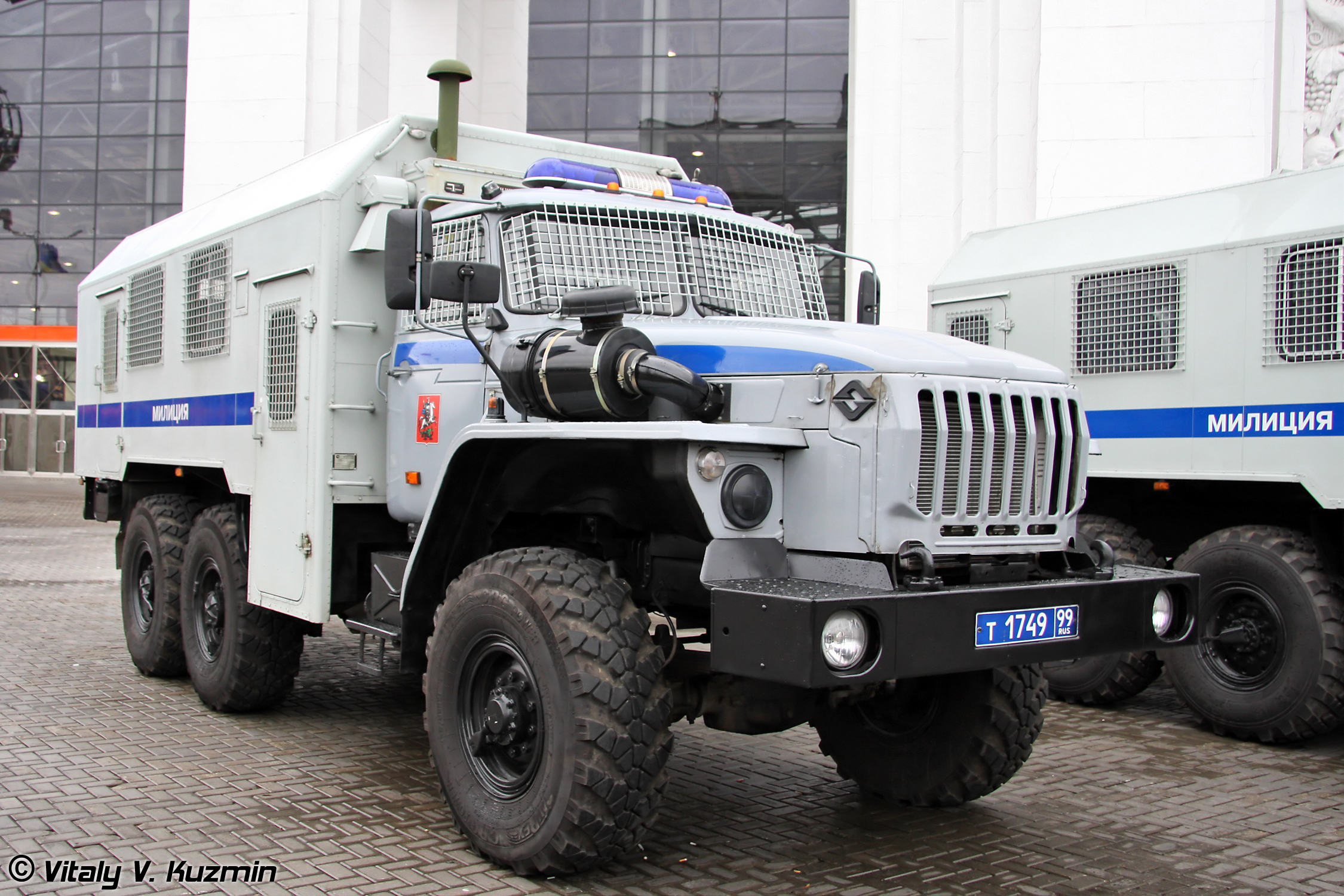
Moscow Militia Ural 572060 also known as VM-4320

- Ural-3255
- Truck bus "Ural-32552-3013-59"
- Truck bus "Ural-32551-3171-59"
- Ural-3255-59
- Ural-32551
- Ural-32552
- Ural-32552-47

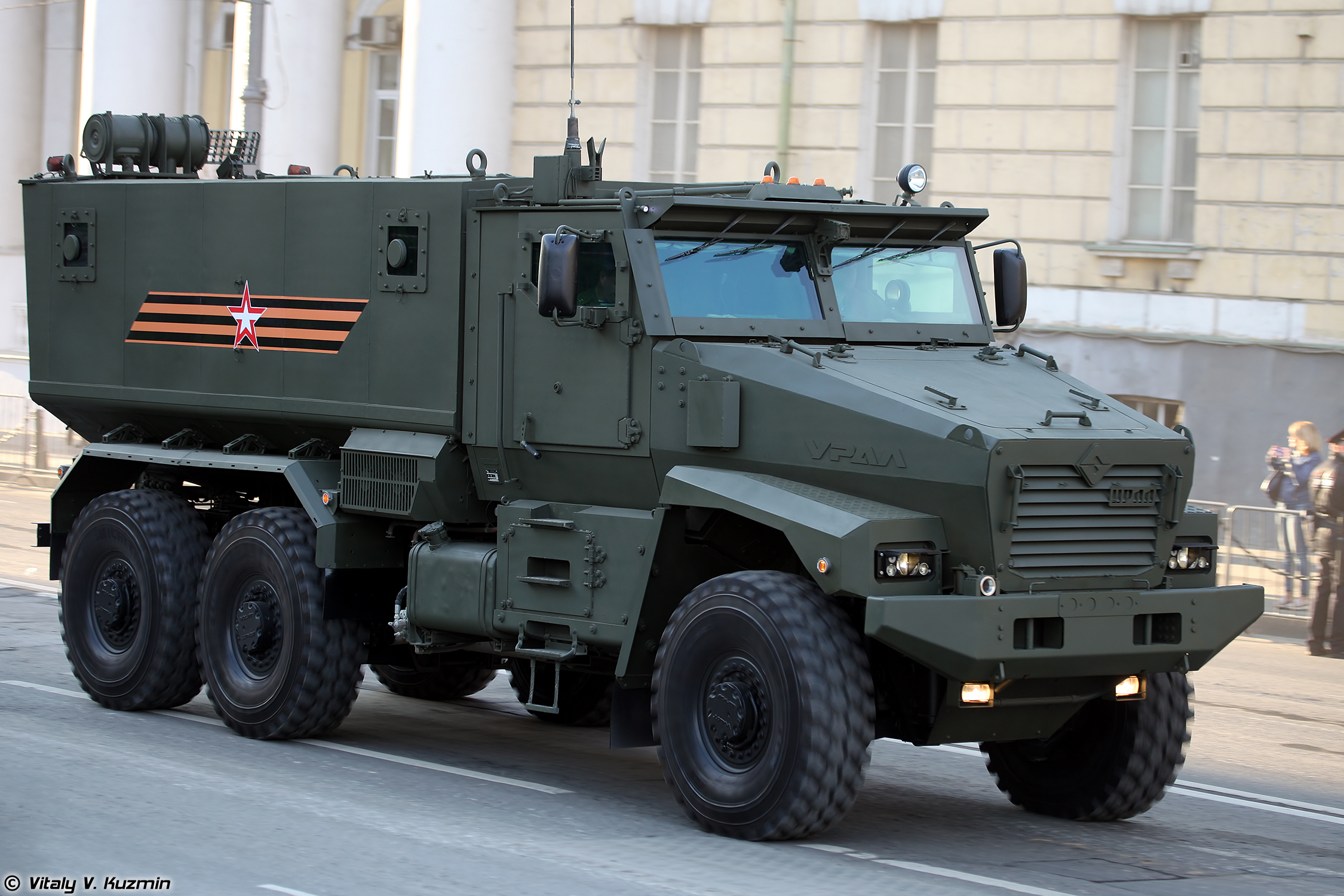
Ural Typhoon Mine-Resistant Ambush Protected Vehicle

=== Chassis, widely used for specialized and military vehicles ===
- Ural-375D
- Ural-4320
- Ural-5323
- Ural-6359 Typhoon MRAP
- Ural-5920 - swamp buggies
- TC-1 - tracked oversnow vehicle on the Ural-5920

==== Fire appliances ====
Ural fire appliance are manufactured in partnership with Ural-Siberian Fire and Technical Company which was founded as Ural trucks subsidiary UralAzSpetsmash.

== See also ==
- Oshkosh
- GINAF
- KrAZ
