= Miass =

City in Chelyabinsk Oblast, Russia

Miass Миасс
- City
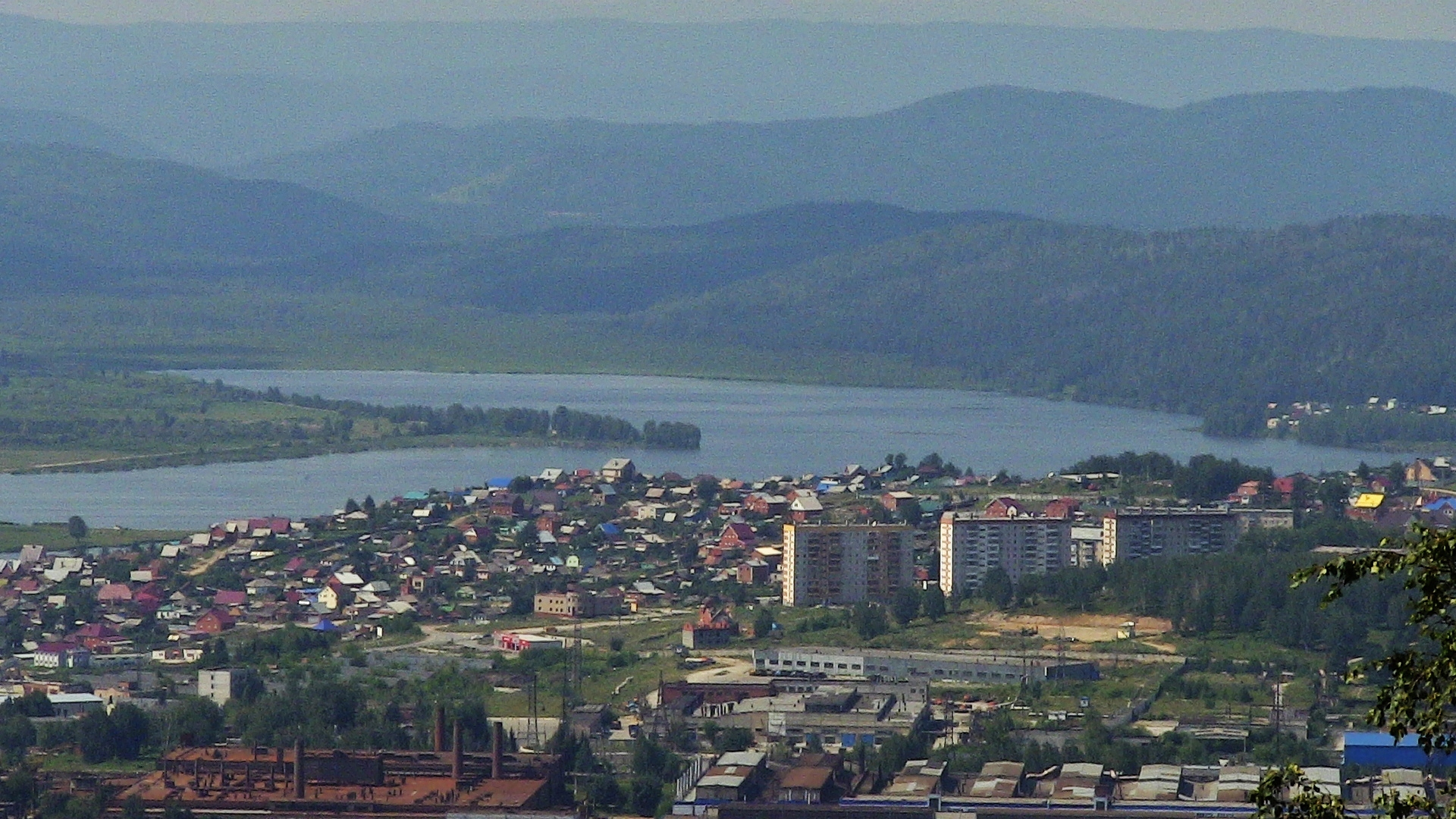
- Miass in July 2011

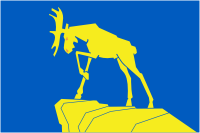
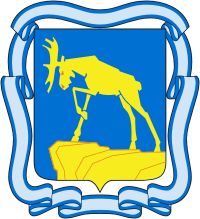
- Flag Coat of arms
- Interactive map of Miass
- Location of Miass Miass (Chelyabinsk Oblast)
- Coordinates: 55°00′N 60°06′E
- Country: Russia
- Federal subject: Chelyabinsk Oblast
- Founded: 1773
- City status since: 1923

Government
  - Head of Miassky Urban Okrug: Igor Voynov
- Elevation: 340 m (1,120 ft)

Population (2010 Census)
  - Total: 151,751
  - Estimate (2025): 146,650 (−3.4%)
  - Rank: 115th in 2010

Administrative status
  - Subordinated to: City of Miass
  - Capital of: City of Miass

Municipal status
  - Urban okrug: Miassky Urban Okrug
  - Capital of: Miassky Urban Okrug
- Time zone: UTC+5 (MSK+2)
- Postal code: 456300
- Dialing code: +7 3513
- OKTMO ID: 75742000001

Miass (Russian: Миа́сс, IPA: [mʲɪˈas]) is a city in Chelyabinsk Oblast, Russia, located 96 kilometers (60 mi) west of Chelyabinsk, on the eastern slope of the Southern Ural Mountains, on the bank of the river Miass. Population: 147,995 (2021 census); 151,751 (2010 census); 158,420 (2002 census); 167,839 (1989 Soviet census).

Historical population
Year	Pop.	±%
1897	16,100	—
1926	20,000	+24.2%
1939	38,000	+90.0%
1959	99,043	+160.6%
1970	131,331	+32.6%
1979	150,179	+14.4%
1989	167,839	+11.8%
2002	158,420	−5.6%
2010	151,751	−4.2%
2021	147,995	−2.5%
Source: Census data

== Name ==
The name Miass (Bashkir: Мейәс) is taken from the Bashkirs, the indigenous inhabitants of these places, with the root of the word meaning "water" or "friend".

== History ==
It was founded in 1773 as a copper mining factory. During the 19th century, the development was driven by the discovery of the richest gold deposits in the Urals. Average annual extraction of gold from the Miass region was about 640 kilograms (1,410 lb). In the mid-19th century, the volume of gold mining went down, and the development of Miass also slowed. Town status was granted to Miass in 1923. In 1941, an automobile factory (which still operates as UralAZ) was built.

== Administrative and municipal status ==
Within the framework of administrative divisions, it is, together with twenty-eight rural localities, incorporated as the City of Miass—an administrative unit with the status equal to that of the districts. As a municipal division, the City of Miass is incorporated as Miassky Urban Okrug.

== Economy and education ==
Currently Miass is a major machinery center. The truck manufacturer UralAZ is one of its most important factories.

=== UralAZ ===
UralAZ produces multi-axle, full-drive trucks of high cross-country passability and exports 8% of the trucks. "UralAZ" was included in the rating of 200 biggest Russian companies in 2000 in volume of sales, and employs 105,000 people. It was established in 1942, when the ZiS factory was evacuated from Moscow during World War II.

=== The State Rocket Center ===
The Makeyev Rocket Design Bureau creates submarine-launched ballistic missiles. In 1955, it was moved from Zlatoust, where it was established in 1947, to Miass.

== Population ==
Ethnic composition (2010):

- Russians – 89.4%
- Bashkirs – 3.6%
- Tatars – 3.4%
- Ukrainians 1.1%
- others – 2.5%

== Tourism ==
The old part of the city comprises 19th-century wooden houses with original balconies, jambs, and lintels. The house of the gold mine's administrator, Simonov, has also been preserved.

Lake Turgoyak is located near Miass and is a popular tourist location, with crystal clear water.

Miass has a rich mineralogical museum, as it is close to the Ilmensky Mineral conservation area.

To the east of Miass is the Ilmenskyy Zapovednik, a large protected forest. Not far into the forest, trails lead to freshwater springs.

== Gallery ==
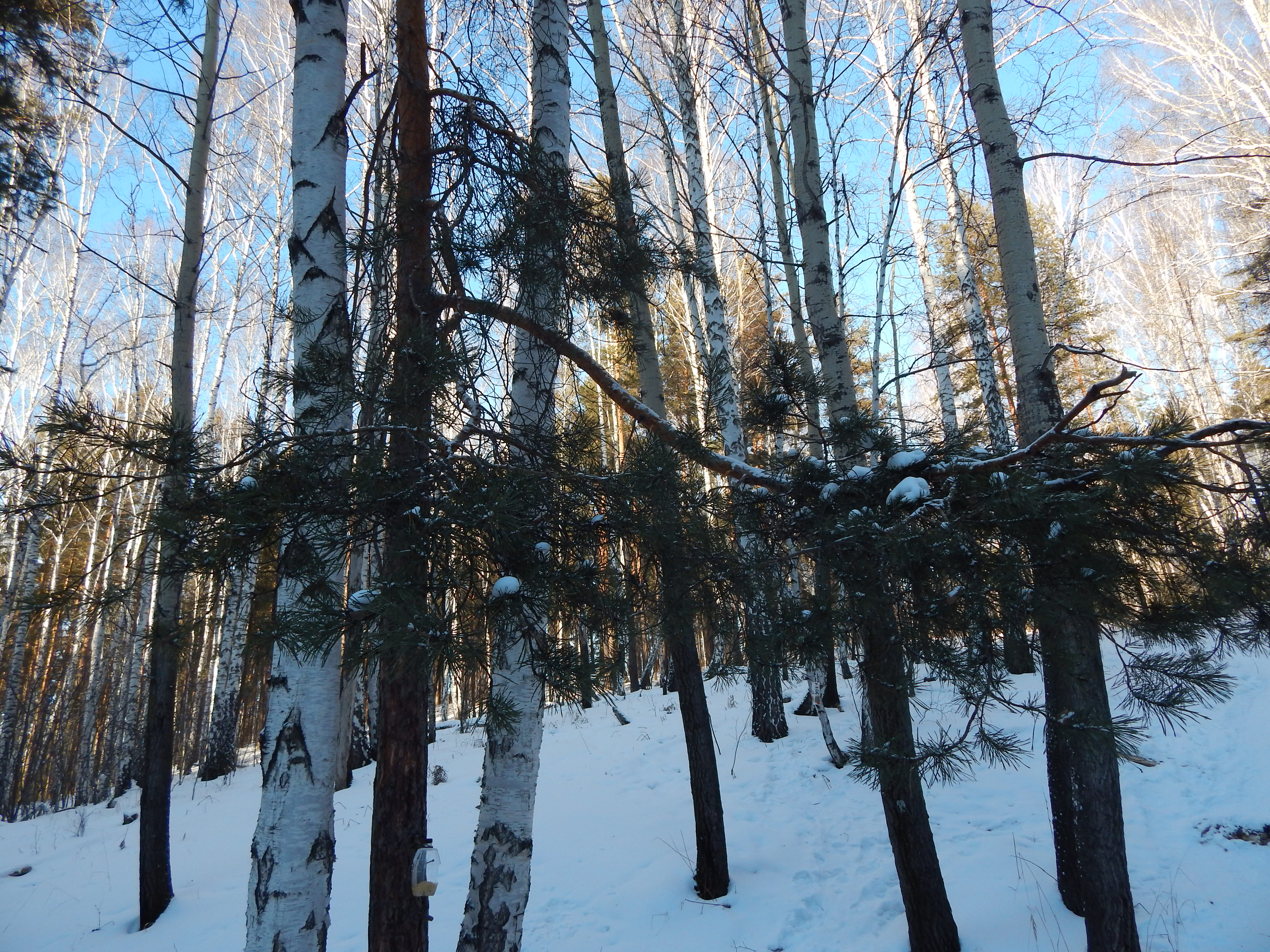
This photo was taken in a protected forest in Miass, Chelyabinsk Oblast, Russia next to a fresh-water spring. It shows Birch (Betula spp.) and Scots pine (Pinus sylvestris).

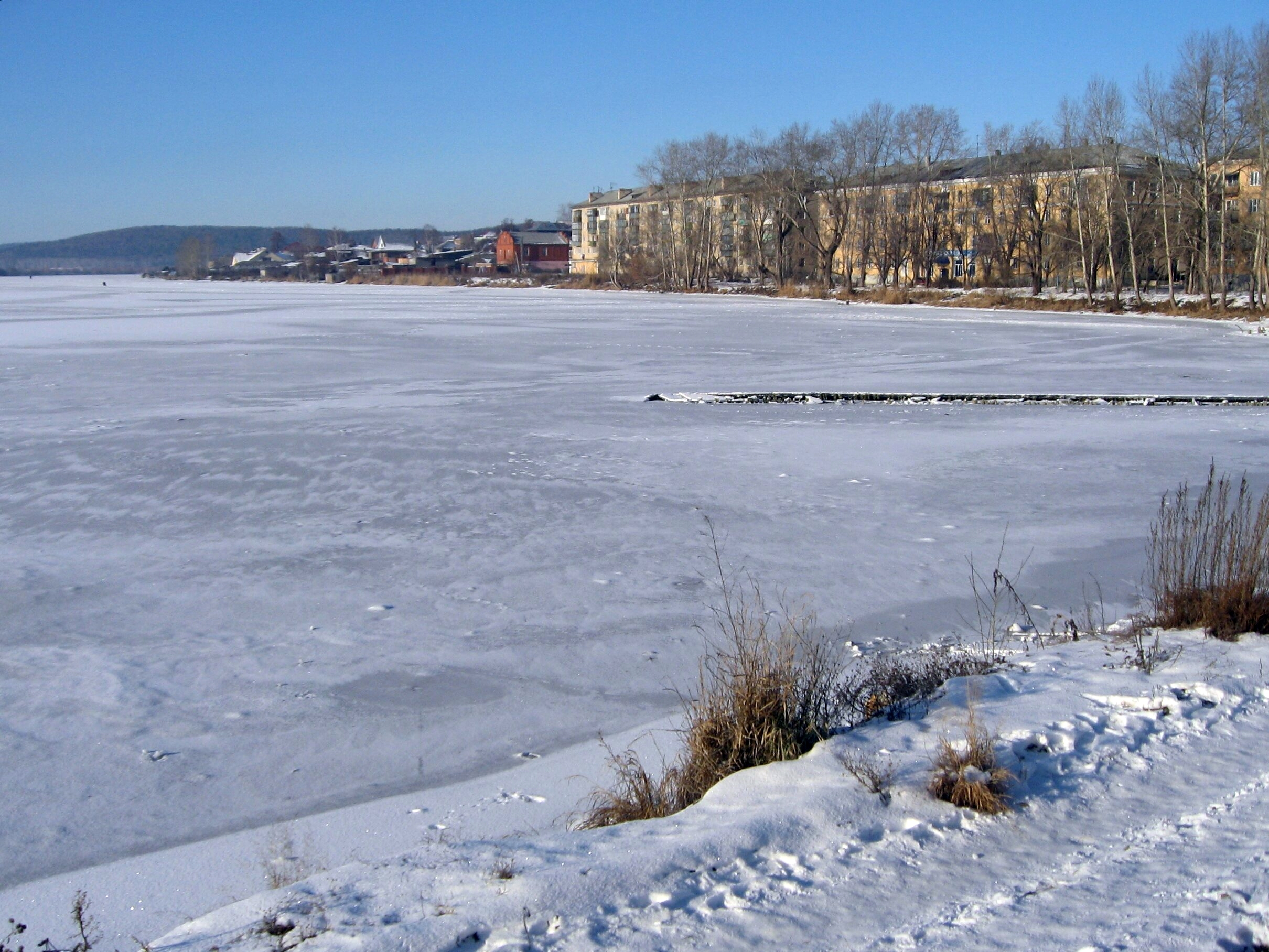
The Miass pond, Proletarskaya street. November 16, 2014.

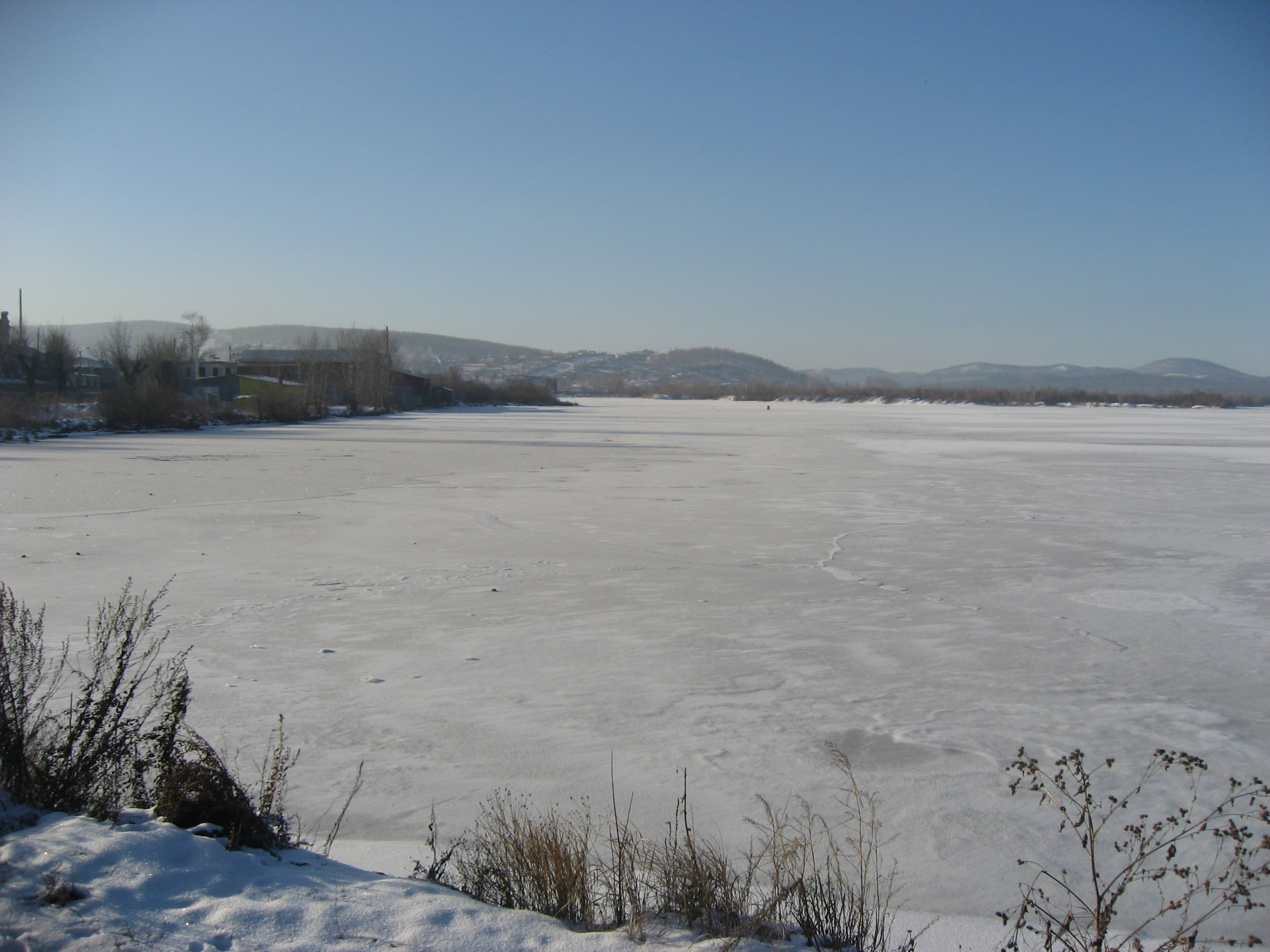
The Miass pond, Proletarskaya street. November 16, 2014.

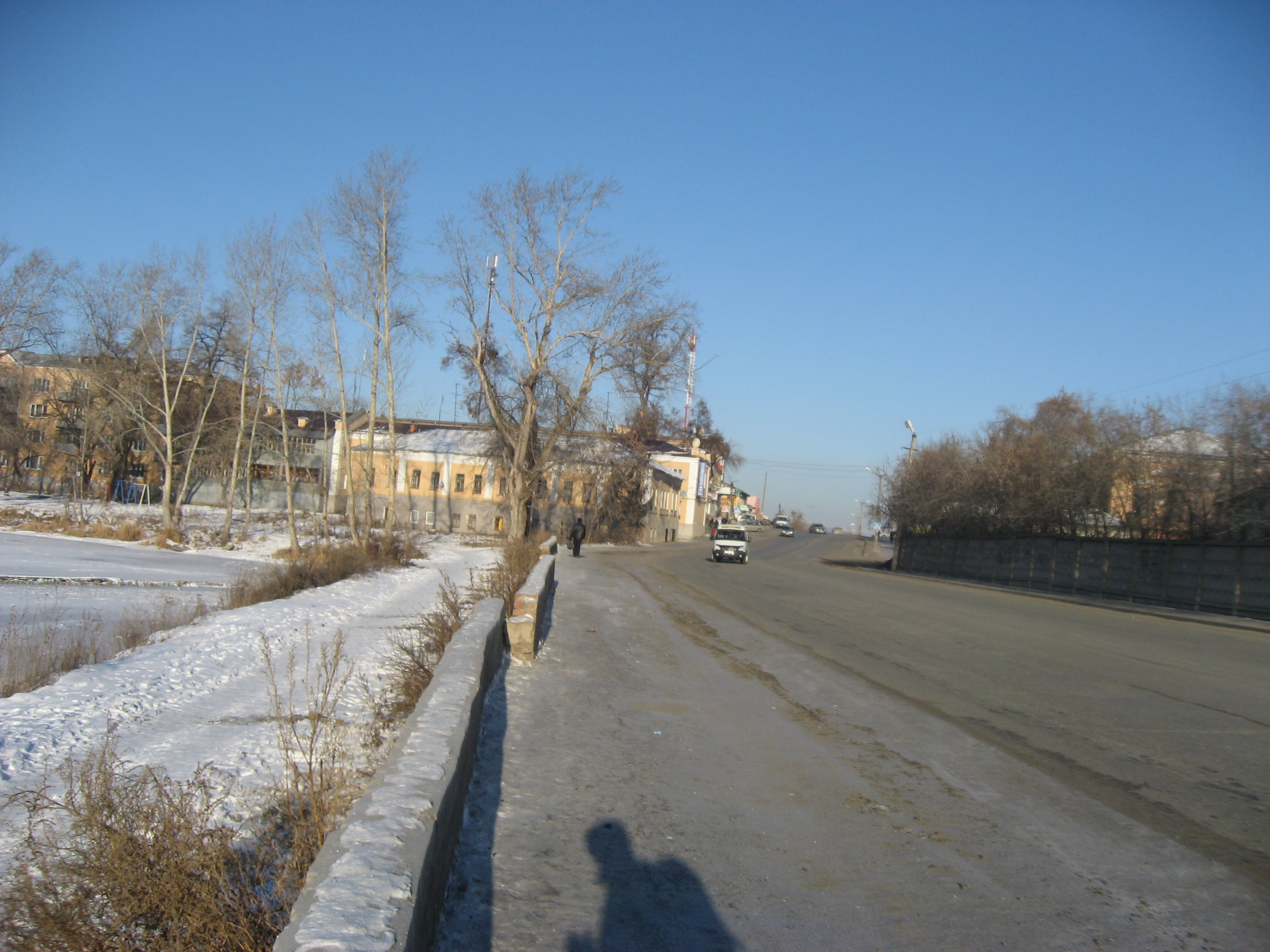
The Miass, Proletarskaya street. November 16, 2014.
