= GAZ-66 =

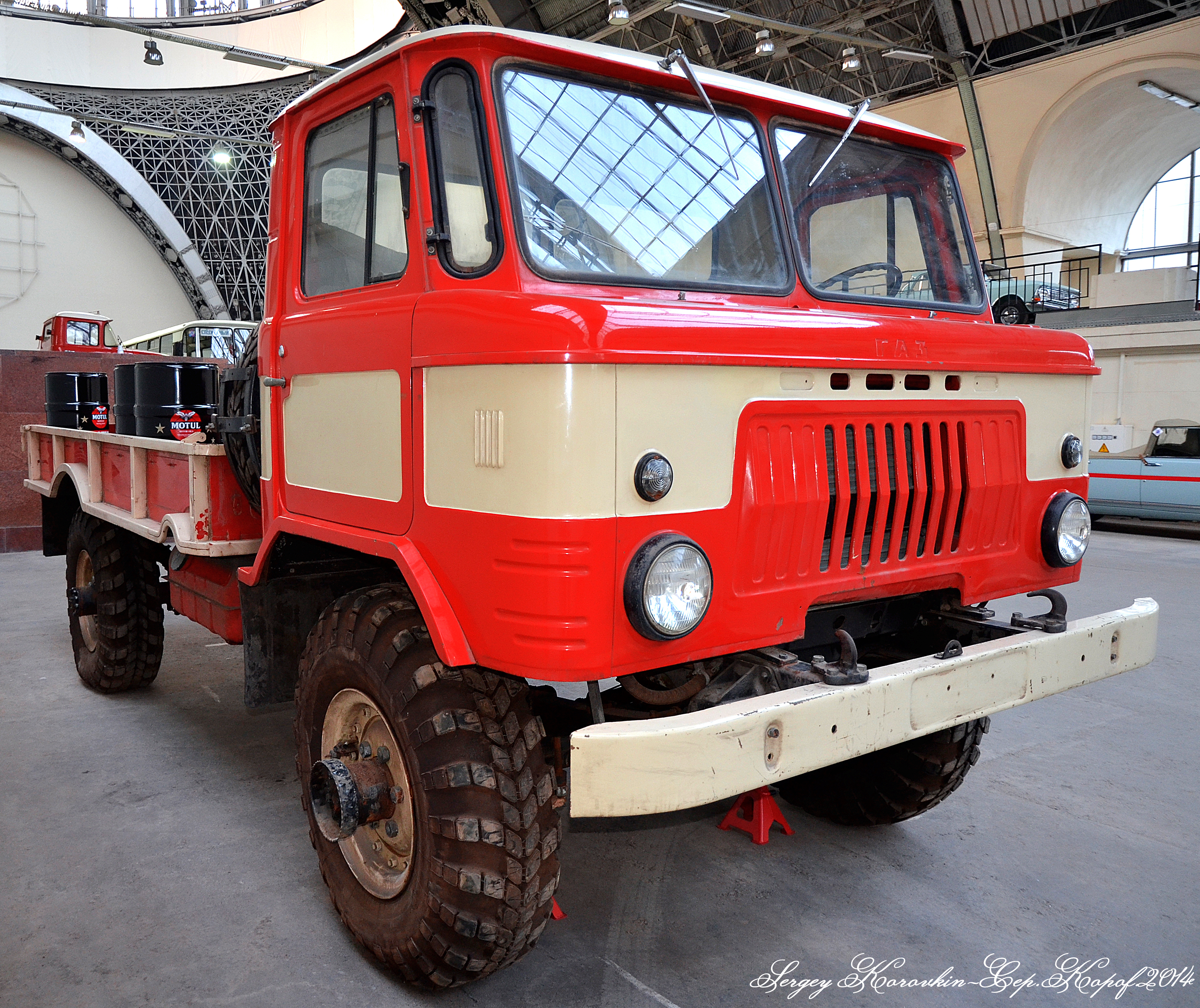

Overview
- Manufacturer: GAZ
- Production: 1964–1998
- Assembly: Soviet Union / Russia: Gorky (Nizhny Novgorod)

Body and chassis
- Class: Truck
- Layout: F4 layout

Powertrain
- Transmission: 4-speed manual

Dimensions
- Wheelbase: 3,300 mm (129.9 in)
- Length: 5,805 mm (228.5 in)
- Width: 2,322 mm (91.4 in)
- Height: 2,520 mm (99.2 in)
- Curb weight: 3,440 kg (7,584 lb)

Chronology
- Predecessor: GAZ-63
- Successor: GAZ-3308

The GAZ-66 is a Soviet and Russian 4x4 all-road (off-road) military truck produced by GAZ. It was one of the main cargo vehicles for motorized infantry of the Soviet Army and is still employed in former Soviet Union countries. It is nicknamed shishiga (шишига), shisharik (шишарик)/shehsherik (шешерик), trueman (in Siberia).

== History ==
After tests and trials, in 1969 GAZ-66 received the state quality mark of the USSR. It was the first USSR truck to receive such an award.

Almost one million vehicles of this type were built for both military and civilian use. The GAZ-66 has gained legendary status in many countries due to its reliability, simplicity and off-road capability. Since the 1960s, the GAZ-66 has been popular with armed forces and off-road enthusiasts. Production ceased in 1999, with the GAZ-3308 being produced instead.

== Basic versions ==
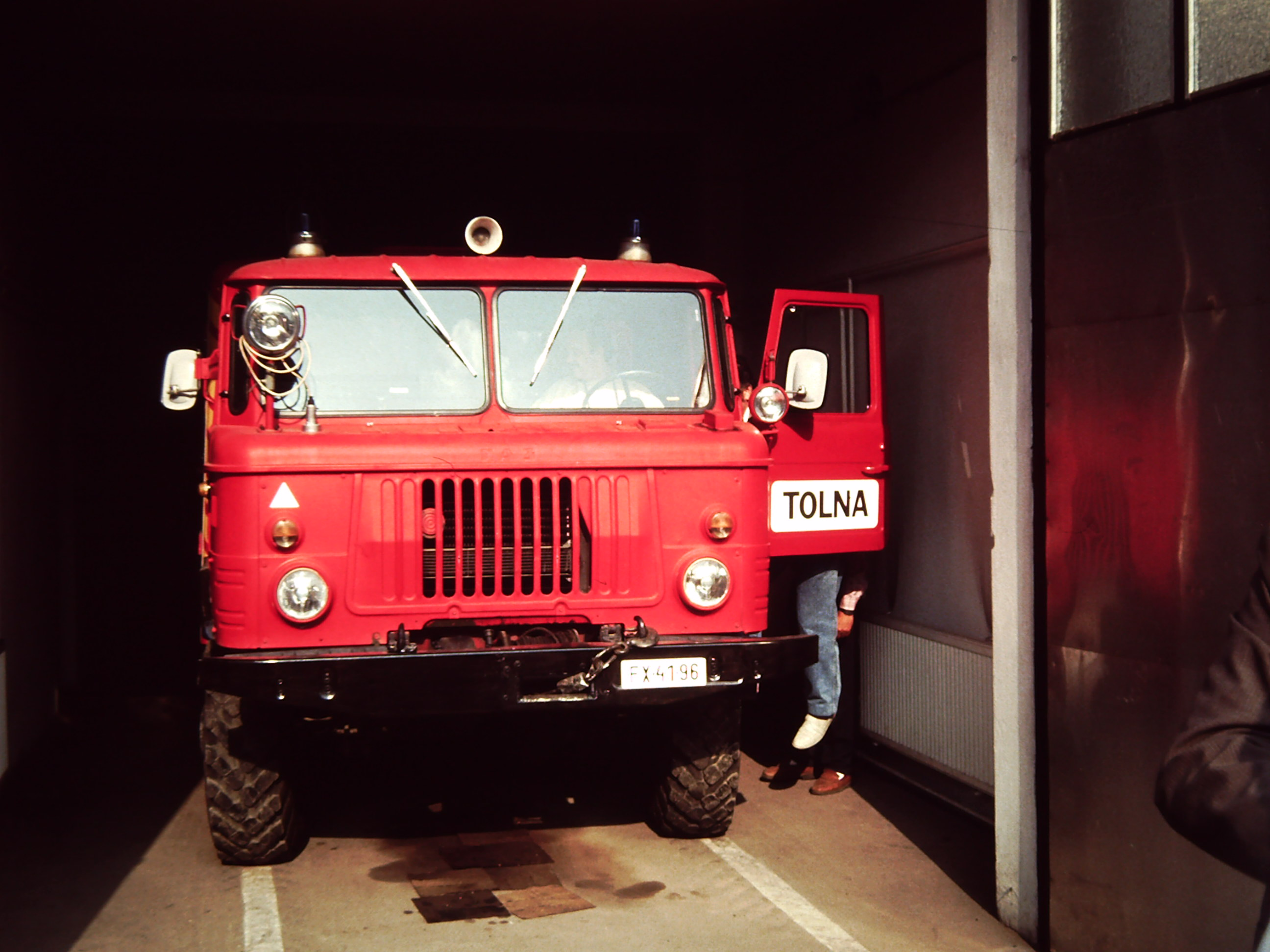
GAZ-66 based fire engine

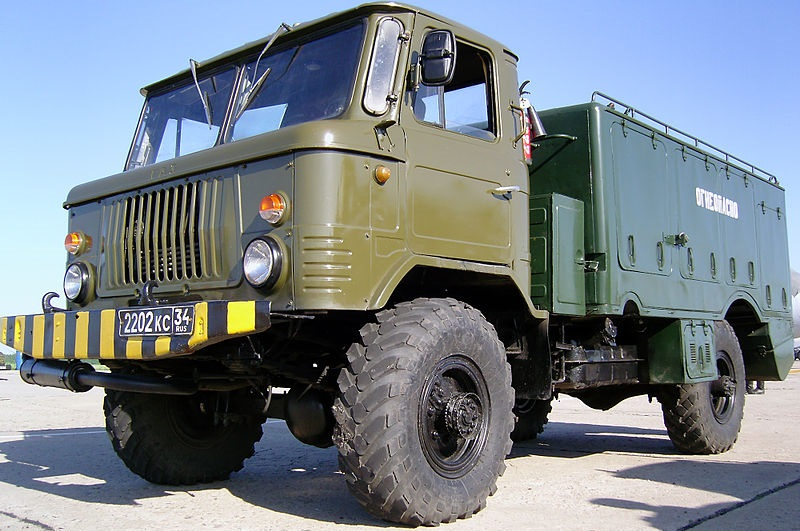
GAZ-66 tanker

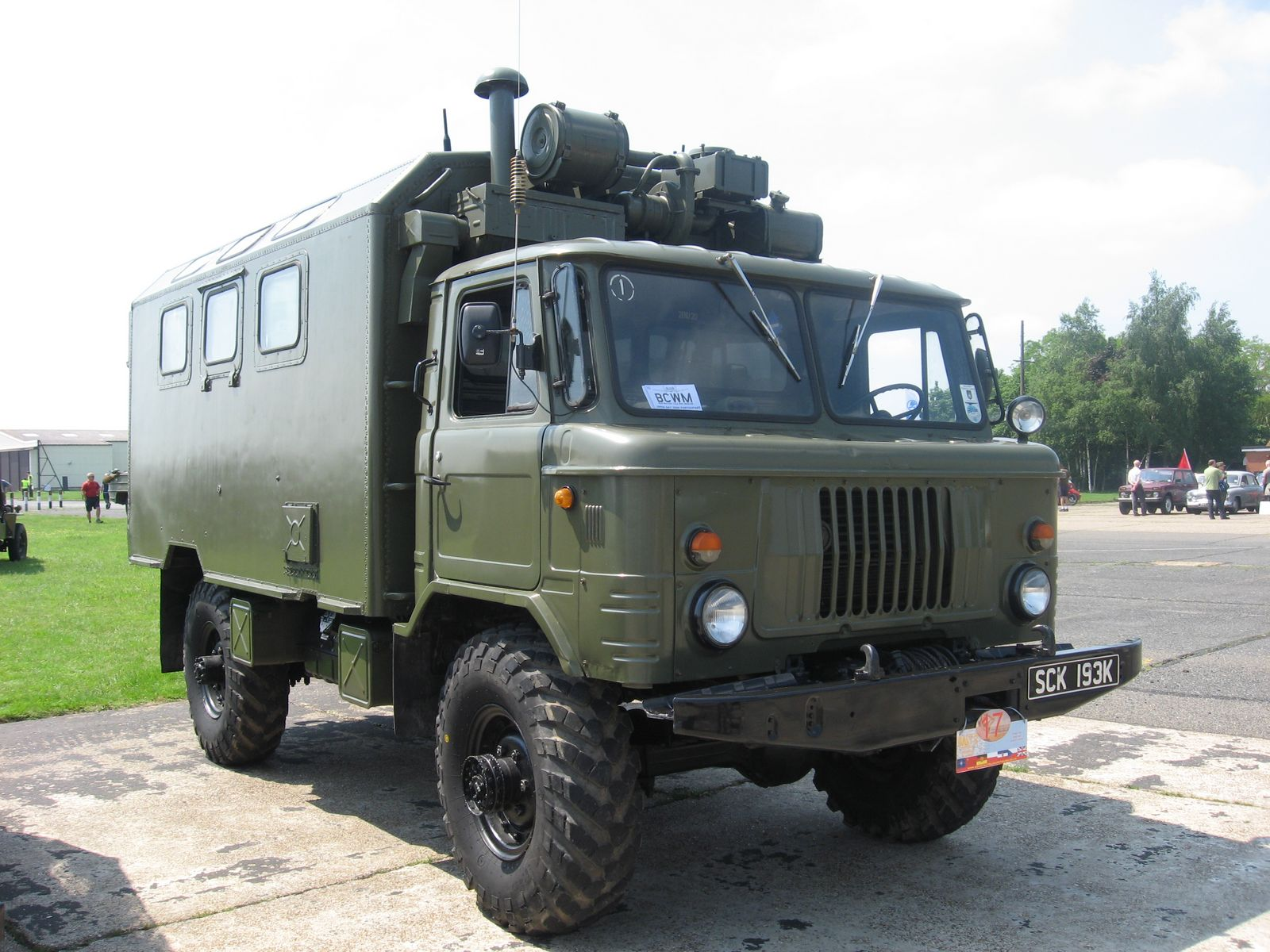
GAZ-66 with KUNG body.

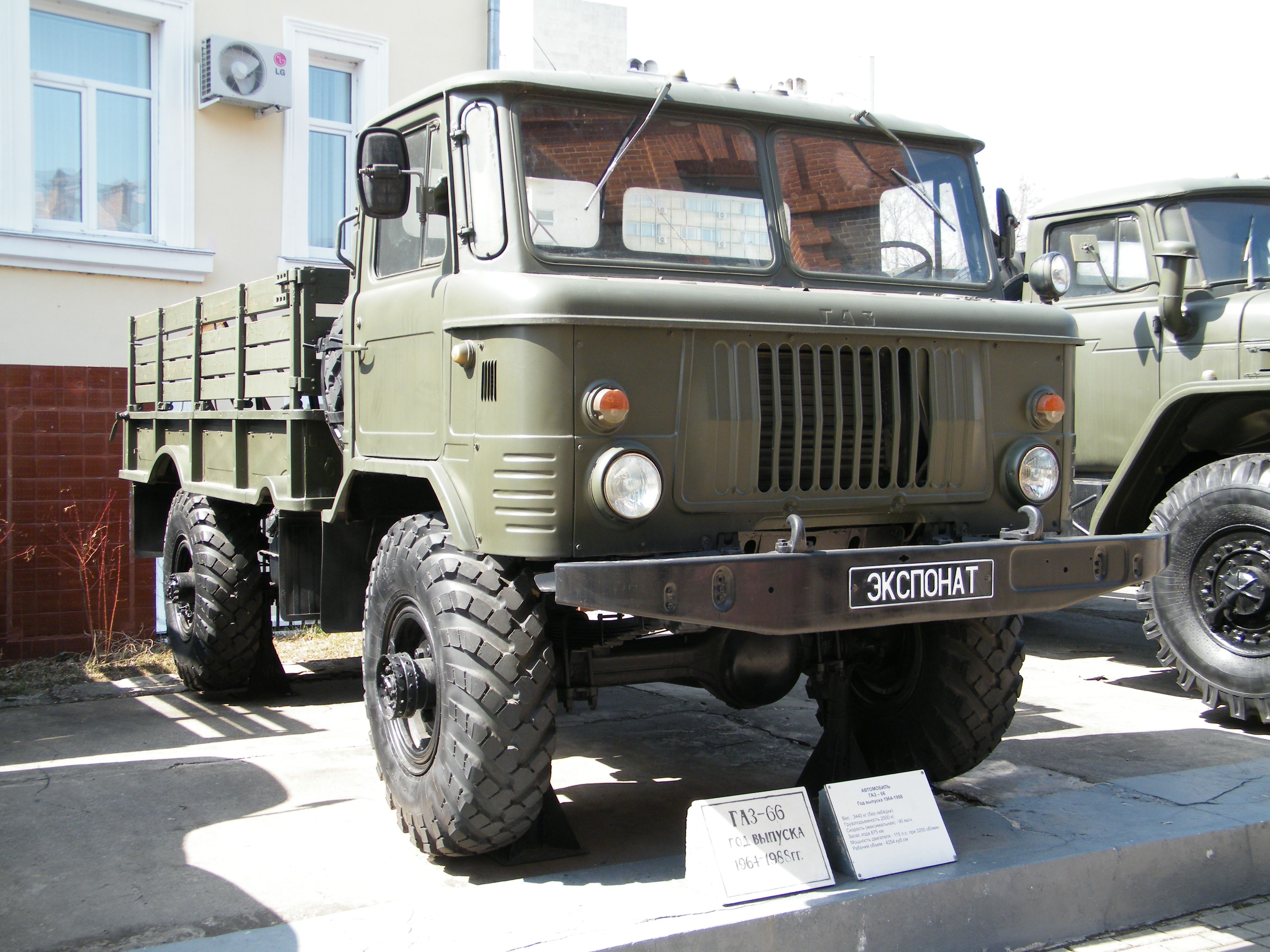
GAZ-66 platform truck

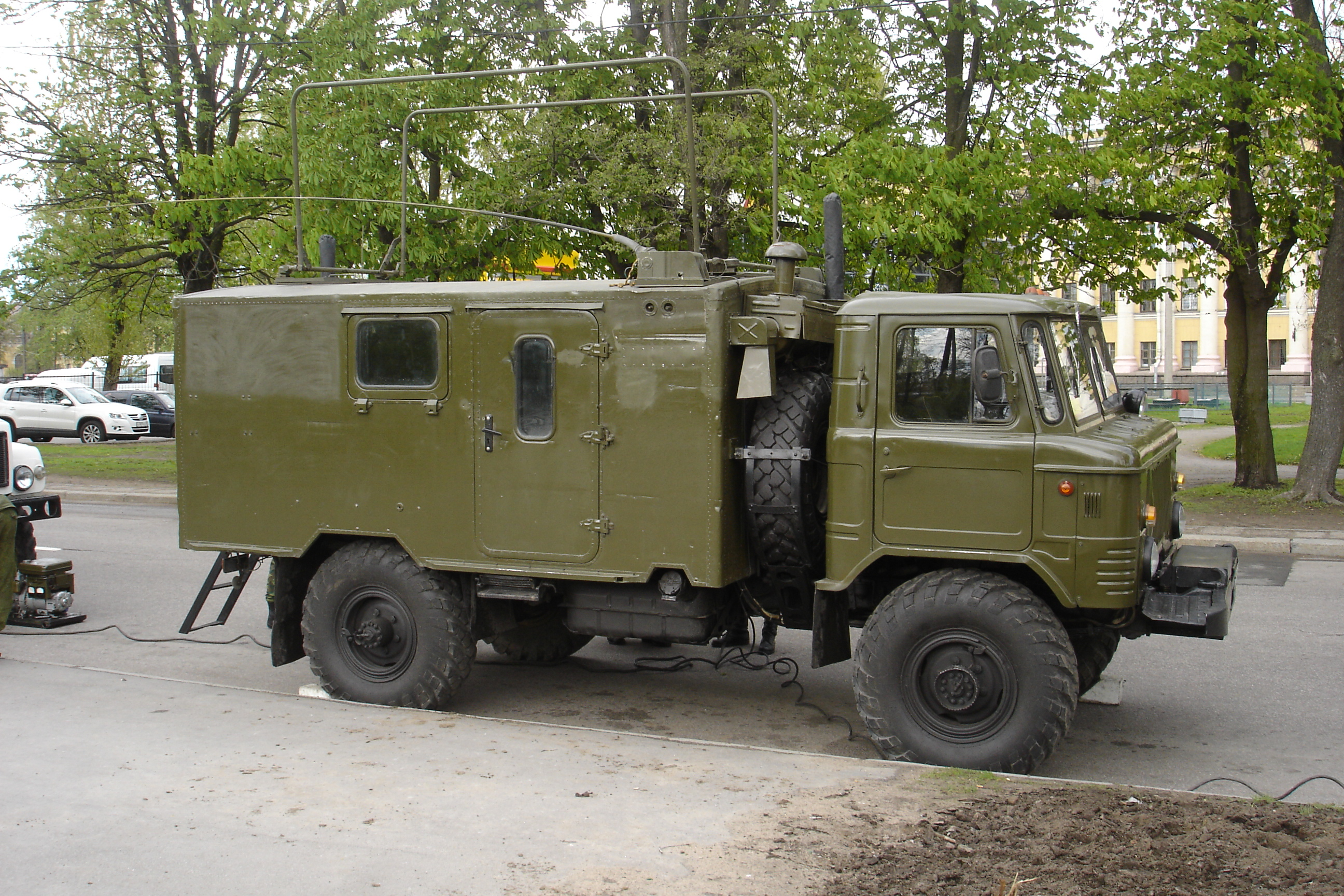
GAZ-66 in Russian military service

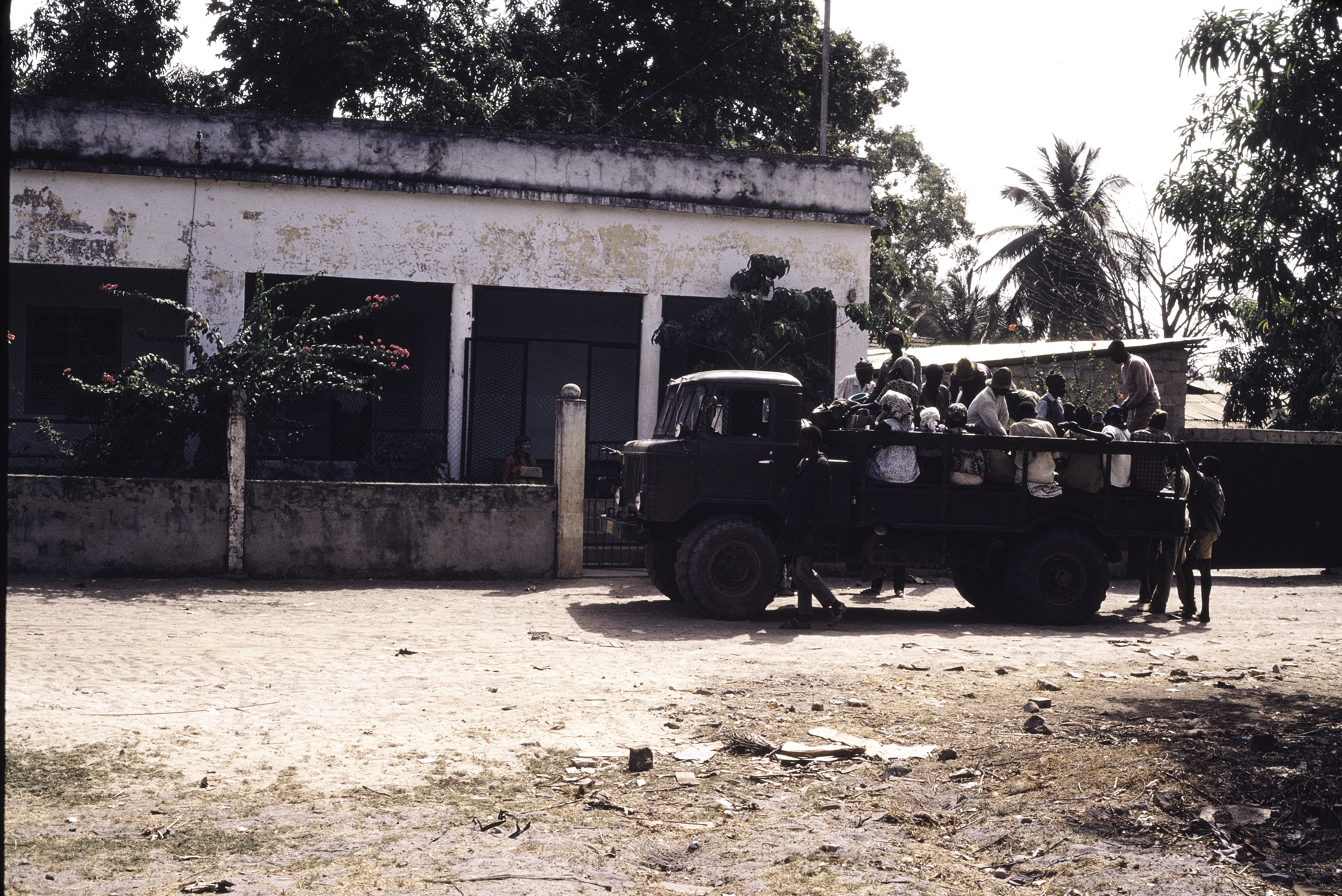
GAZ-66 in military service with the PAIGC liberation movement in Guinea-Bissau, 1973

- GAZ-66-1 (1964–1968) – the first model with no centralized system for adjusting the air pressure in the tires
- GAZ-66A (1964–1968) – with a winch
- GAZ-34 – a 6×6 prototype
- GAZ-66B (1966) – Paratrooper version with telescopic steering column, folding roof and folding windshield frame
  - BM-21V "Grad-V" (Vozdushnodesantiy – 'airborne') (NATO designation M1975): Developed for airborne troops in 1969. A GAZ-66B 4x4 truck chassis is fitted with a 12-round 122 mm rocket launcher. The vehicle is sturdy enough to be air-dropped. Parts of the vehicle such as the canvas cab roof can be taken off or folded down to reduce its size during transit. Like the BM-21, the BM-21V has stabilizing jacks on the rear of the vehicle for support when firing. The launch vehicle has the industrial index of 9P125.
- GAZ-66D (1964–1968) – the chassis with a power take-off
- GAZ-66P – tractor (experimental)
- GAZ-66E (1964–1968) – with shielded electrical equipment
- GAZ-66-01 (1968–1985) – the base model with a centralized control system for tire pressure
- GAZ-66-02 (1968–1985) – with a winch
- GAZ-66-03 (1964–1968) – with shielded electrical equipment
- GAZ-66-04 (1968–1985) – the chassis with shielded electrical equipment
- GAZ-66-05 (1968–1985) – with shielded electrical equipment and a winch
- GAZ-66-11 (1985–1996) – upgraded base model
- GAZ-66-12 (1985–1996) – with a winch
- GAZ-66-14 (1985–1996) – the chassis with shielded electrical equipment and a power take-off

== Military versions ==
- GAZ-66-15 (1985–1996) – with shielded electrical equipment and a winch
- GAZ-66-16 (1991–1993) – modernized version with ZMZ-513.10, reinforced tires (wheels – lean), completed the brakes, the platform without intruding wheel niches (also installed on GAZ-66-11 and GAZ-66-40 ), load capacity 2.3 tons
- GAZ-66-21 (1993–1995) – the national-economic modification with the dual tires and rear axle wooden platform GAZ-53, load capacity 3.5 tons
- GAZ-66-31 – chassis for trucks
- GAZ-66-41 (1992–1995) – a naturally aspirated GAZ-544 diesel engine
- GAZ-66-40 (1995–1999) – with a GAZ-5441 turbodiesel
- GAZ-66-92 (1987–1995) – for use in the far north
- GAZ-66-96 – chassis for shift buses

=== Export versions ===
- GAZ-66-51 (1968–1985)
- GAZ-66-52 (1968–1985) – with a winch
- GAZ-66-81 (1985–1995) – for countries with a temperate climate
- GAZ-66-91 (1985–1995) – for countries with a tropical climate

=== Specialised versions ===
- AP-2 – aid station, the main transport unit regimental aid station.
- AS-66 – ambulance, designed to evacuate the wounded.
- DDA-2 – disinfecting shower installation, is used in the military (sometimes civil) sanitary-epidemiological units.
- GZSA-731, 983A, 947, 3713, 3714 – Vans "Mail", "bread" and "Medicine"
- MZ-66 – Lube.
- 3902, 3903, 39021, 39031 – mobile workshops to provide technical assistance to agricultural machinery.
- 2001, 2002, 3718, 3719, 3716, 3924, 39521 – mobile clinics
- NZAS-3964, Volgar-39461 – watch buses
- GAZ-SAZ-3511 – tipper for agricultural purposes on the GAZ-66-31 (build – Saransk).
- GAZ-KAZ-3511 – tipper for agricultural purposes on GAZ-66-31 (build – Bishkek, Kyrgyzstan)

== Operators ==
- Angola
- Armenia
- Belarus – Armed Forces of Belarus
- Bulgaria
- China
- Cuba
- Egypt
- Georgia
- Guinea-Bissau
- Hungary
- Iran
- Iraq
- Libya
- Moldova – Armed Forces of the Republic of Moldova
- North Korea
- Laos
- Poland: Only specialized variants in use.
- Syria
- (Socialist Republic of Romania) Romania – Romanian Armed Forces
- Russia
- Transnistria
- Ukraine – Ukrainian Armed Forces
- Vietnam

=== Former operators ===
- Afghanistan – Armed Forces of the Democratic Republic of Afghanistan
- Finland – purchased 200 regular GAZ-66 trucks and 100 special versions for the Finnish Defence Forces in 1972–1975. Another 140 units were purchased in 1986–1989.
- East Germany – passed on to Germany after reunification; retired.
- USSR – passed on to successor states.

== Specifications ==
Specifications for GAZ-66-11

Design

- Cab-forward design, 2-seat cab + 21 passengers in the back.
- Payload: 2,000 kg (4,400 lb) plus the same weight trailer
- Suspension: Solid axles with leaf springs

Engine

- Type- ZMZ-66-06 V8 petrol (carburetor) OHV engine; heavy duty version of the ZMZ-53
- Displacement: 4,254 cc (Bore 92 mm (3.622 in), Stroke 80 mm (3.150 in))
- Compression ratio: 7.6:1
- Output: 120 hp (89 kW) @ 3,200 rpm
- Torque: 284.5 N⋅m (210 lbf⋅ft) @ 2,000-2200 rpm
- Max. speed- 90 km/h (56 mph)(speed governed)

Brakes

- Type: Drums, with hydraulic control, single circuit, servo assisted
- Stopping distance from 20 mph: 27'

Measurements

- L×W×H: 5,805 mm (19 ft 1 in) x 2,322 mm (7 ft 7 in) x 2,490 mm (8 ft 2 in)(cab) / 2,520 mm (8 ft 3 in)(tent)
- Wheelbase: 3,300 mm (129.92 in)
- Track front/rear: 1,820 mm (71.65 in)/1,750 mm (68.90 in)
- Curb weight: 3,440 kg (7,580 lb)
- Fuel tanks: 2 x 105 L (23 imp gal; 28 US gal)
- Fuel economy: 31.5 L/100 km (9 mpg_{‑imp}; 7 mpg_{‑US})

Maneuverability

- Turning circle: 9.5 m (31 ft)
- Approach angle: 41°
- Departure angle: 32°
- Max. ascent angle: 31–37° (fully loaded)
- Ground clearance: 315 mm (12 in)
- Fording depth: 1 m (39 in)

Tires

- Size: 12–18"
- Pressure: Adjustable with central tyre inflation system from cab

== Popular culture ==
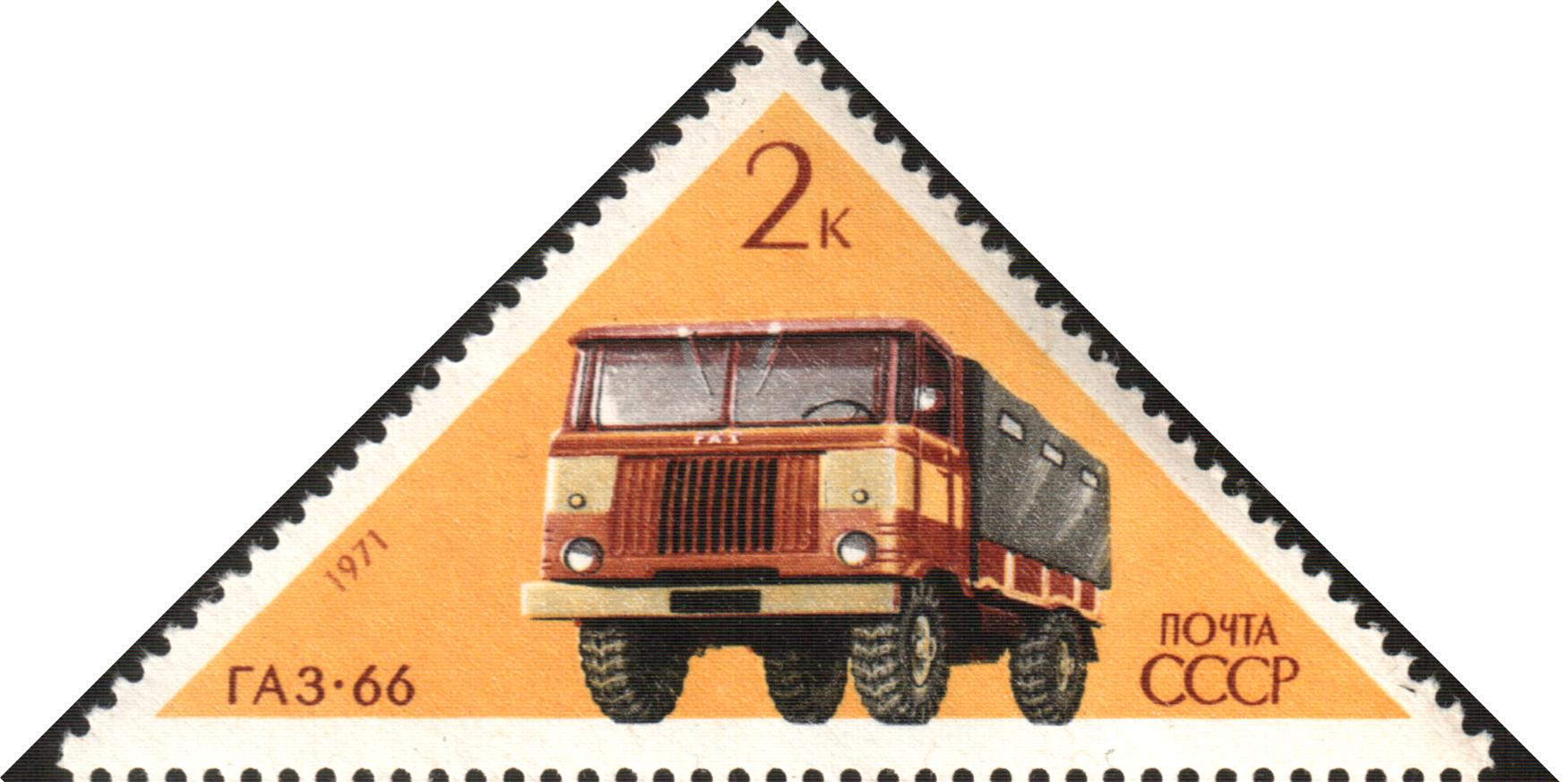
Soviet stamp, 1971

- In the 2010 game Call of Duty: Black Ops, the GAZ-66 is used as a transport for guards in the level "Vorkuta".
- It is mentioned in the 1991 Tom Clancy novel The Sum Of All Fears.
- In the Russian version of the TV show Top Gear, a test was conducted on the vehicle's strengths: the body had building rubble dropped on it, it was set on fire and submerged in water. After all these tests, it kept going.
- The GAZ-66 was featured in the movie The Expendables 2 with Jean-Claude Van Damme.
- The GAZ-66 is a truck in the game MudRunner with the name of B-66 due to copyright claims.
- In the 2019 HBO TV miniseries Chernobyl, the truck is used by Gen. Col. Vladimir Pikalov, commander of the Soviet Chemical Troops, to carry out a radiation measuring at the damaged power plant, with high-range dosimeter placed at the front and lead sheets covering the cabin.
- In the 2020 film Wonder Woman 1984. Appears in the Middle Eastern convoy scene.

== Bibliography ==
- Foss, Christopher F.; Gander, Terry J., eds. (1991). Jane's Military Vehicles and Logistics 1991-92 (12 ed.). Jane's Information Group. ISBN 978-0-7106-0950-2.
