= GAZ-3308 Sadko =

Russian 4-wheel-drive truck

GAZ-3308 "Sadko"
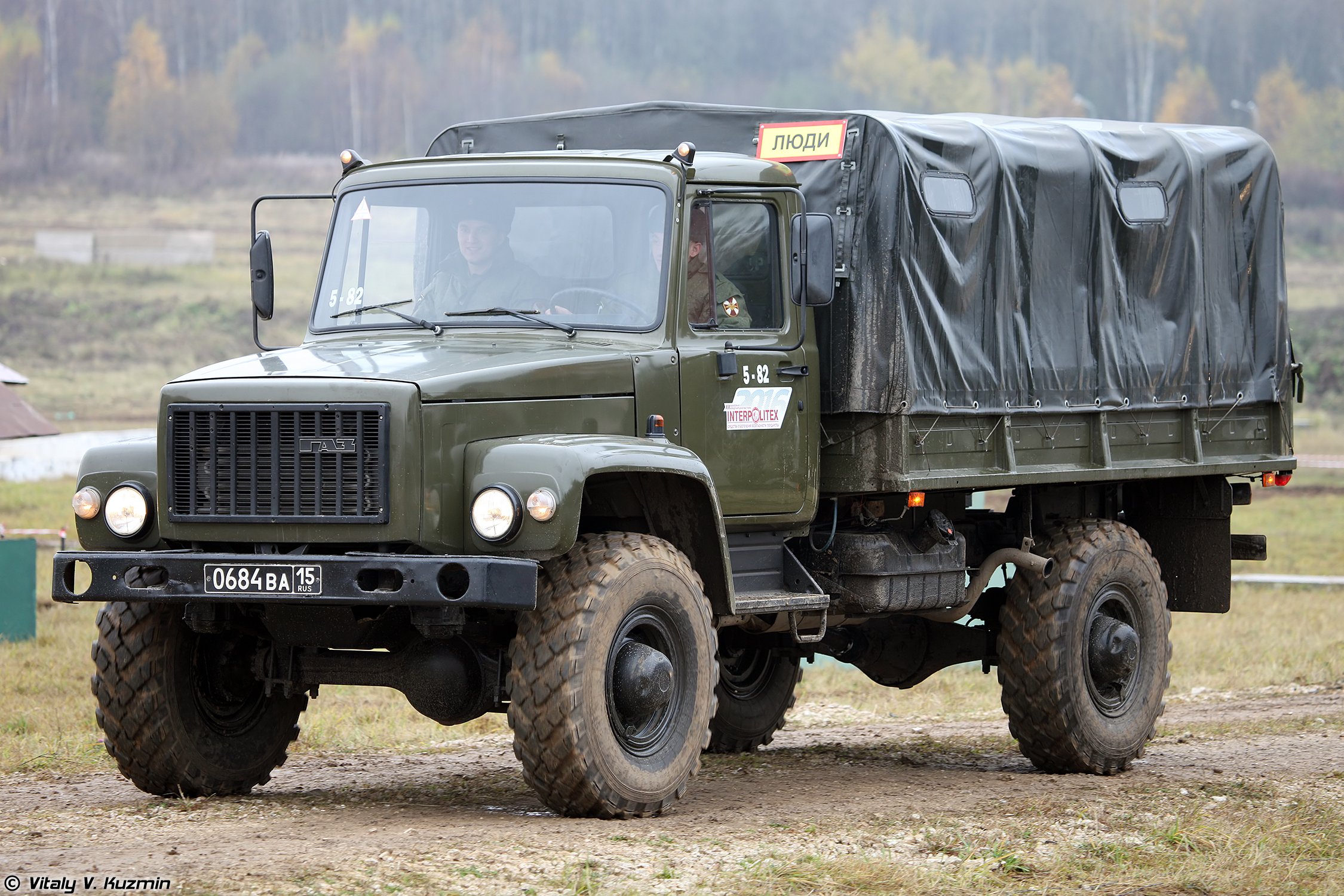

Overview
- Manufacturer: Gorky Automobile Plant
- Production: 1997–2020
- Assembly: Russia: Nizhny Novgorod

Body and chassis
- Class: Medium truck
- Body style: Flatbed truck
- Layout: F4 layout

Powertrain
- Engine: ZMZ-5231 4.67 L V8 engine; MMZ D245.7 4.75 L turbodiesel straight-4; YaMZ-53442 4.43 L turbodiesel
- Transmission: 5-speed manual

Dimensions
- Wheelbase: 108.7 in (2,761 mm)
- Length: 249.9 in (6,347 mm)
- Width: 92.13 in (2,340 mm)
- Height: 102.2 in (2,596 mm)

Chronology
- Predecessor: GAZ-66
- Successor: Sadko NEXT

The GAZ-3308 "Sadko" (Russian: Садко) is a Russian-built, 2.5-ton, 4-wheel-drive cargo truck. The Sadko is produced by the Gorky Automobile Plant (GAZ). It is named after Sadko, a protagonist in many bylinas of the Novgorod cycle.

Sadko has been replaced in production by the Sadko Next (Ru:САДКО NEXT).

== History ==
The current GAZ-3308 series of vehicles served as a replacement for the GAZ-66, which was produced for approximately 35 years (from 1964 until 1999). The first prototype was developed by the Gorky Automobile Plant in 1995 under the designation GAZ-33097. Series production began in December, 1997, receiving the designation GAZ-3308 and the name "Sadko." In the Russian Army it replaced the GAZ-66-40 cab-over-engine truck. For this purpose certain modifications were implemented including the cab from the GAZ-3309 with fenders featuring enlarged wheel arches as well as drive axles and transmission analogous to those used on the GAZ-66-40.

Since 2003, most GAZ-3308 trucks have been equipped with a MMZ D-245.7 turbodiesel engine, which starting in 2005, met the requirements of the Euro-2 emission standard. In 2013, this engine was replaced by the type D-245.7E4 meeting the Euro-4 emission standard.

In 2005 the GAZ-33086 "Zemlyak" variant was introduced; mainly differing in that it had a 4-wheel rear axle allowing for an increased 4-ton carrying capacity.

In 2013 another variant, the GAZ-33088, was introduced with a YaMZ-53442 turbodiesel engine meeting the Euro-4 emission standard.

In June, 2014 GAZ presented a new version with the unofficial name of Sadko NEXT which had an increased carrying capacity of 3 tons, as well as a new version of GAZ-3309.

== Major variants ==
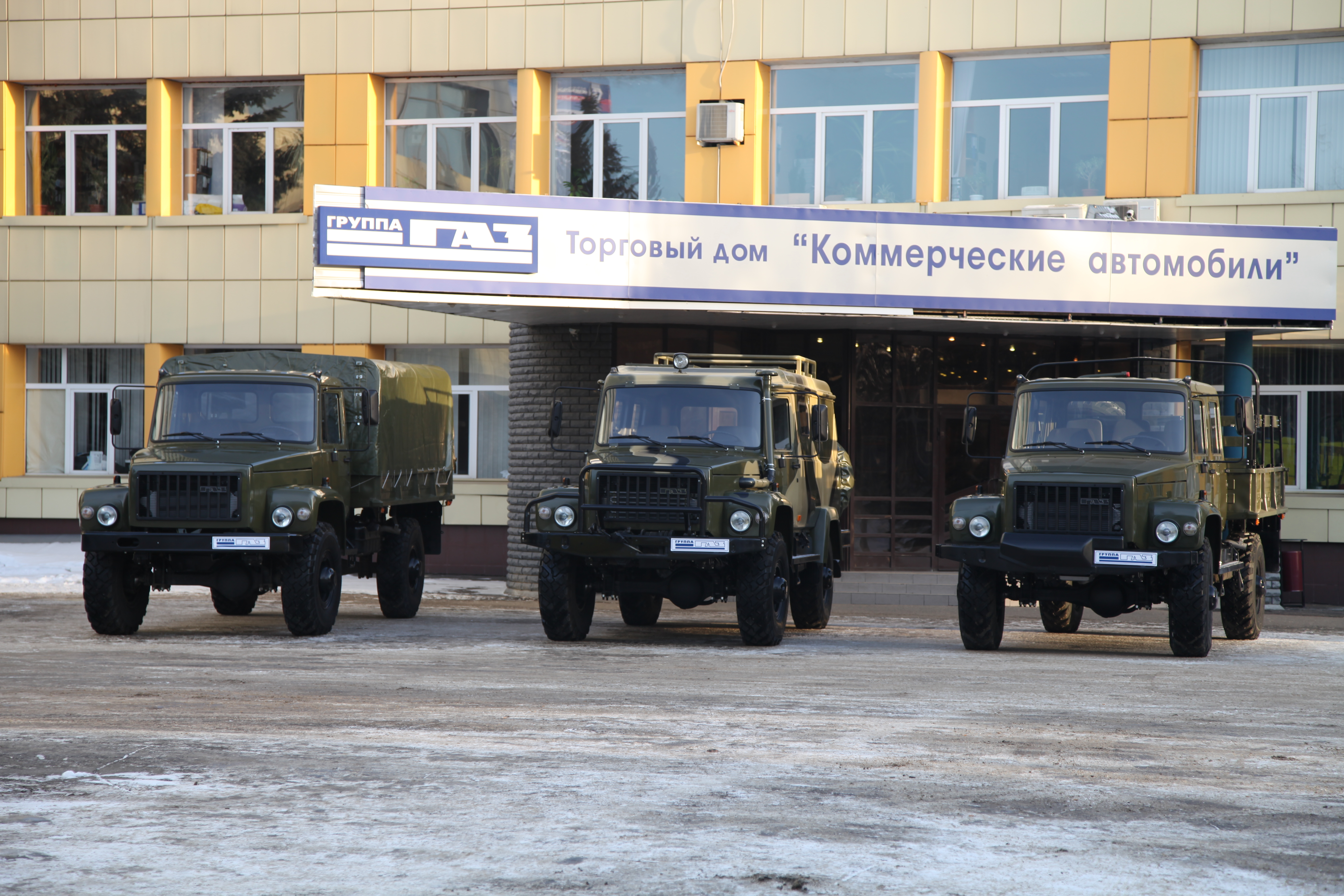
The basic Sadko family, left to right, GAZ-33088 Sadko, GAZ-330811 Vepr and GAZ-33081 Eger

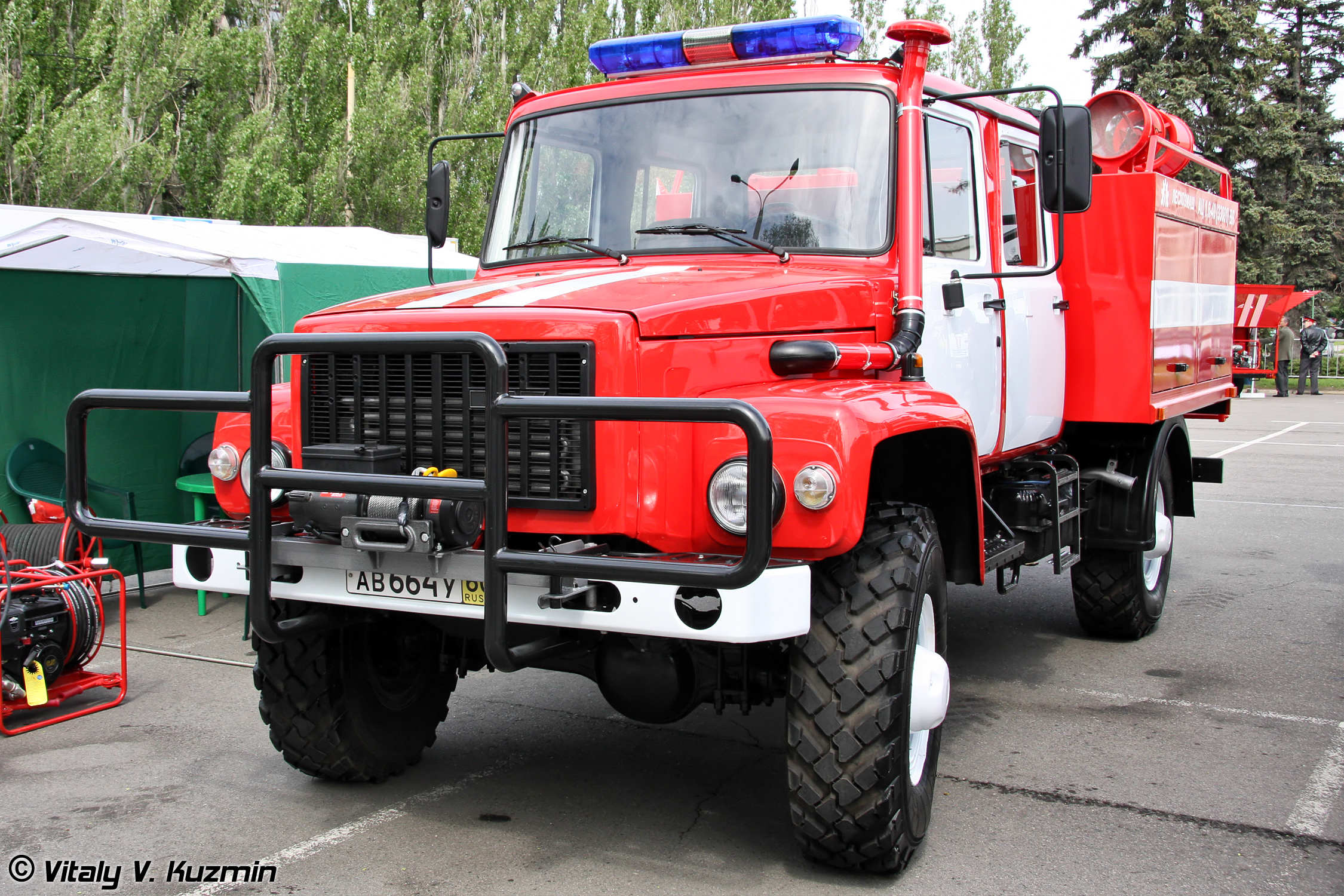
GAZ Sadko Eger fire truck.

- GAZ-3308 - base model with a 130-horsepower carburetted engine ZMZ-5231.10 with 4.67 litre displacement.
- GAZ-33081 - modified version with a 117-horsepower turbodiesel engine MMZ D-245.7 with 4.75 litre displacement.
- GAZ-33082 - early version with a GAZ-562 turbodiesel engine produced under license from Steyr;
- GAZ-33085 and GAZ-33086 (GAZ Zemlyak) with a payload capacity of 4 000 kg. This truck has inferior cross-country performance compared to the Sadko;
- GAZ-33088 - modified version with a 134.5-horsepower YaMZ-53442 turbodiesel engine with 4.43 litre displacement.

== Buses based on the "GAZ-3308" chassis ==
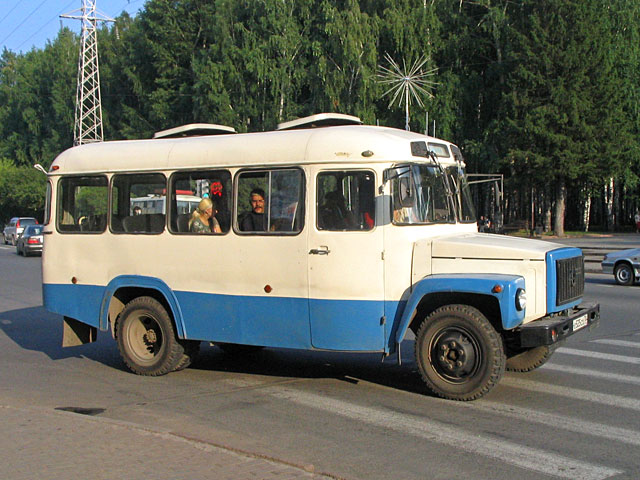
KAvZ-3976 bus on Sadko chassis

- KAvZ-39766 - KAvZ-built all-terrain 19-seat bus utilising a KAvZ-3976 bus body. Modifications: 397660 - with the ZMZ-513 engine (modernized ZMZ-66), 397663 - with the MMZ D-245.7 engine. Produced in 2003–2005.
- SemAR (Ru:СемАР)-3257 - all-terrain 12-seat bus utilising a Semar-3280 bus body. Equipped with the ZMZ-513 engine. Produced between 2001 and 2006.

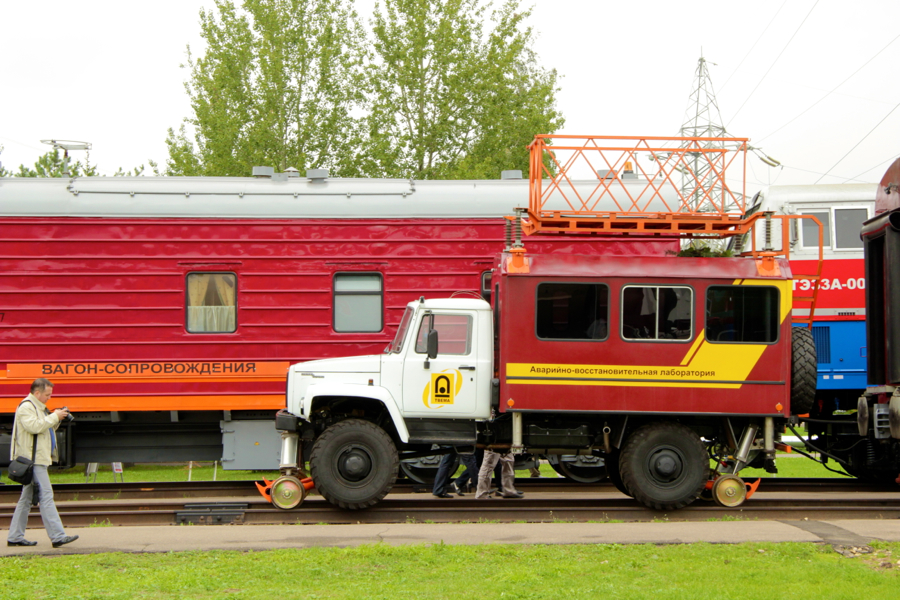
GAZ Sadko rail truck Shift bus.

- Shift bus on the GAZ-3308 chassis - Utility "vahtovka" with a separate angular body placed behind the GAZ-3308 cab. Made between 2003 and 2006 by Semar, it has subsequently been manufactured by Auto Pro.

== GAZ Vepr ==
The GAZ-330811-10 Вепрь Vepr (En:Wild Boar) is a special-purpose vehicle based on a shortened GAZ-3308 chassis with a 3- or 5-door all-metal body. Vepr retains all the advantages of a car but has the off-road capability of the Sadko.

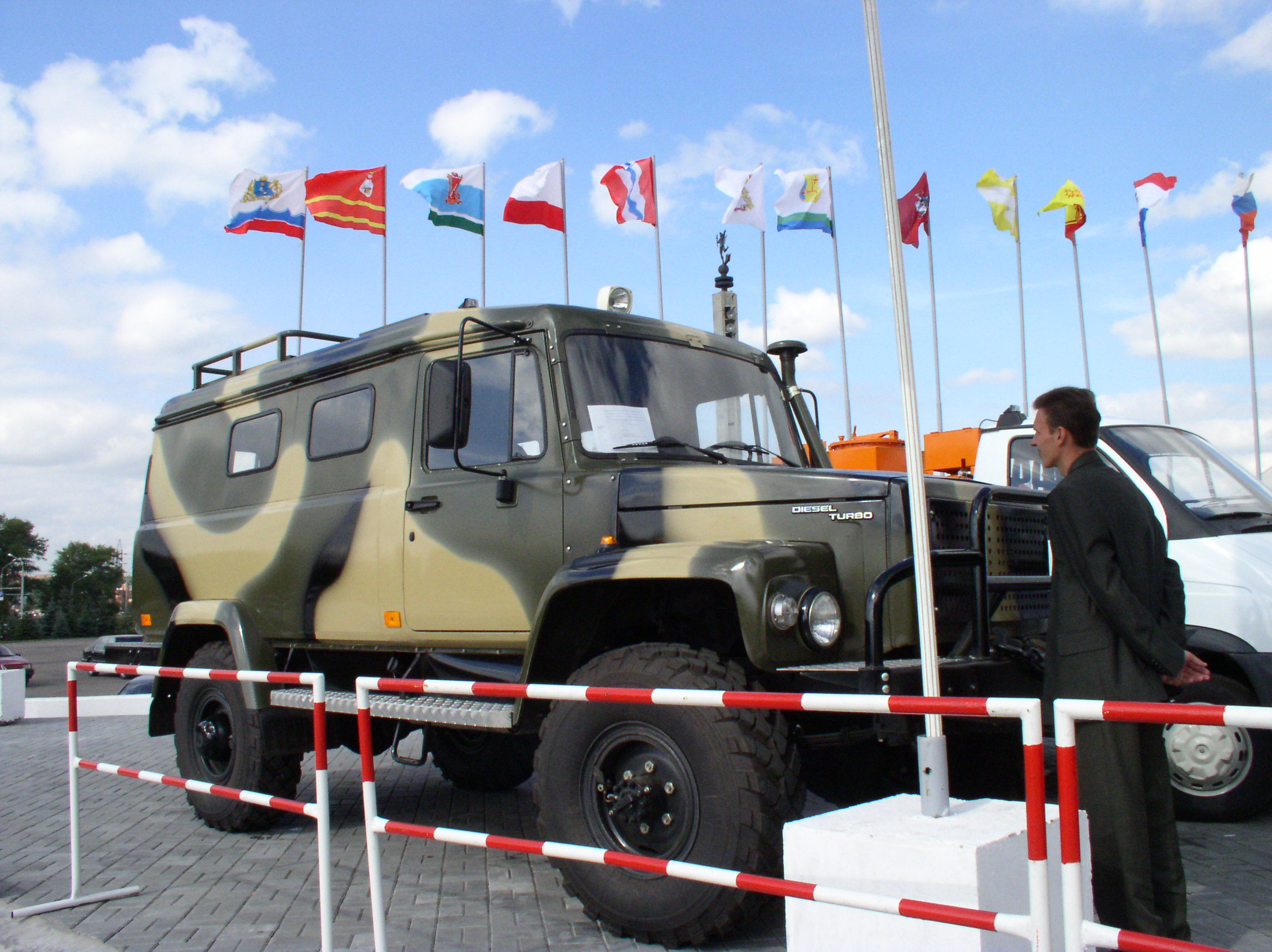
GAZ Vepr (Wild Boar)

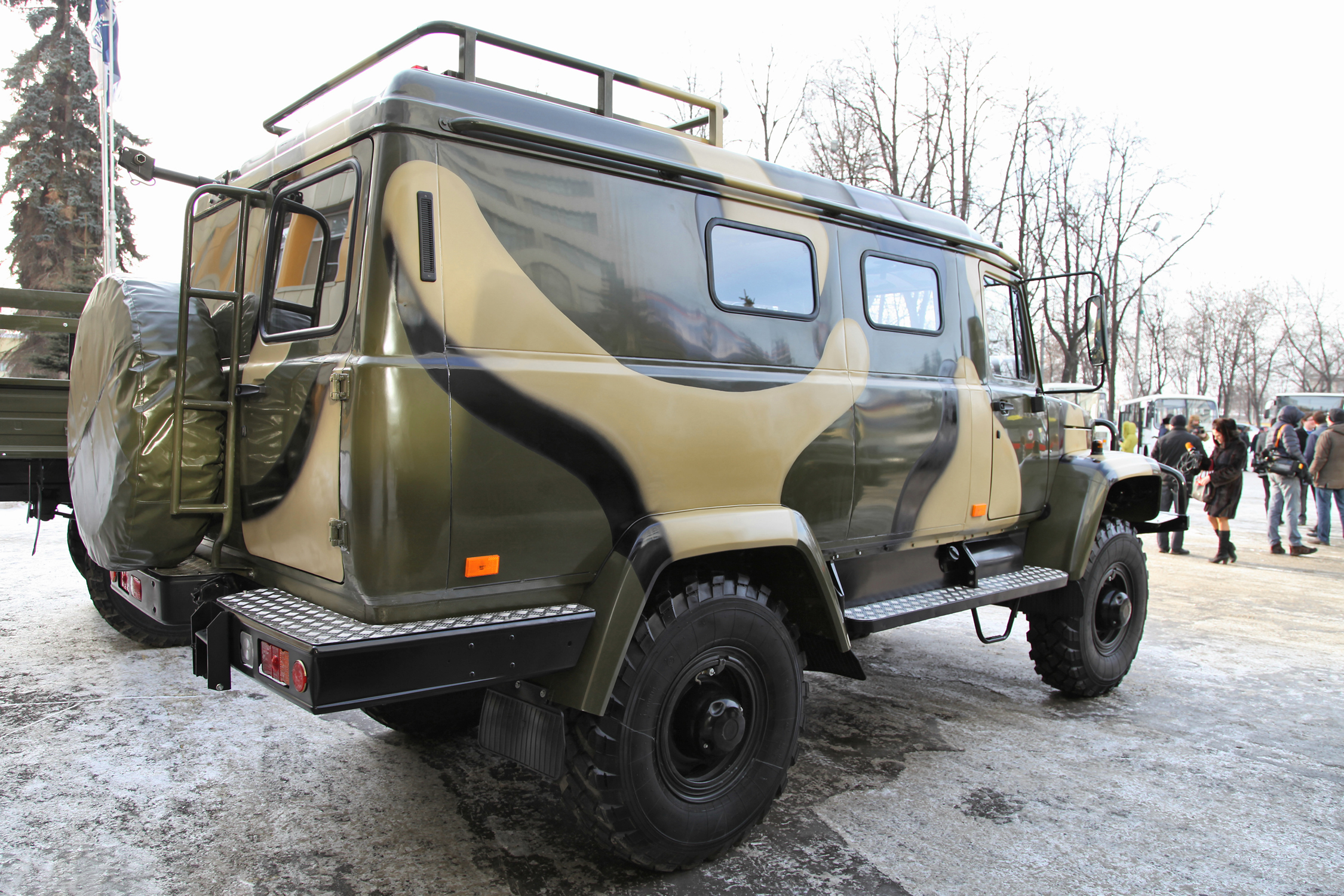
GAZ Vepr (Wild Boar) rear oblique

== Dimensions ==
- Length: 6347 mm
- Width: 2340 mm
- Height: 2595 mm
- Weight:
  - 4150 kg (curb)
  - 6450 kg (full)

== Engines ==
ZMZ-5231 • Carbureted V-8 • Displacement: 4.67 l • Power: 124 hp • Torque: 298 Nm

MMZ D-245.7 • Turbodiesel I-4 • working volume - 4.75 l • Power 117 hp • Torque: 382 Nm

MMZ D-245.7E3 • Turbodiesel I-4 • Displacement: 4.75 l • Power: 119 hp • Torque: 420 Nm

YaMZ-53442 • Turbodiesel I-4 • Displacement: 4.43 l • Power: 134.5 hp • Torque: 417 Nm

Engines are coupled to a 4- or 5-speed manual gearbox. A central tyre inflation system is standard.

== Operators ==
- Armenia
- Bolivia
- Cambodia
- Islamic State
- Laos
- Lebanon
- Philippines
  - Philippine Army - 90 were procured through public bidding
  - Philippine National Police -47 procured through public bidding.
- Russia - GAZ-3308 was adopted as a military truck for the Russian Armed Forces
- Syria - 114 GAZ-3308 trucks were sold to Syrian Armed Forces in 2005
- Ukraine - National Guard of Ukraine Some were procured from Russia, others were captured by the AFU during the Russo-Ukrainian War
