= Vepr (disambiguation) =

Vepr is Russian or Ukrainian for a Wild boar (Ru:вепрь and UK:Вепр) can also refer to:

== Vehicles ==
- VEPR, a Ukrainian off-road vehicle
- GAZ Vepr, a version of the GAZ Sadko

== Weapons ==
- Vepr, a Ukrainian assault rifle
- Molot Vepr, a Russian series of semi-automatic hunting and sporting rifles based on the RPK
- Vepr-12, a series of Russian semi-automatic shotguns based on the Molot Vepr

== Vessels ==
- Russian submarine K-157 Vepr

== See also ==
- Javelina
