= Combination bus =

Passenger vehicle based on a truck chassis cab

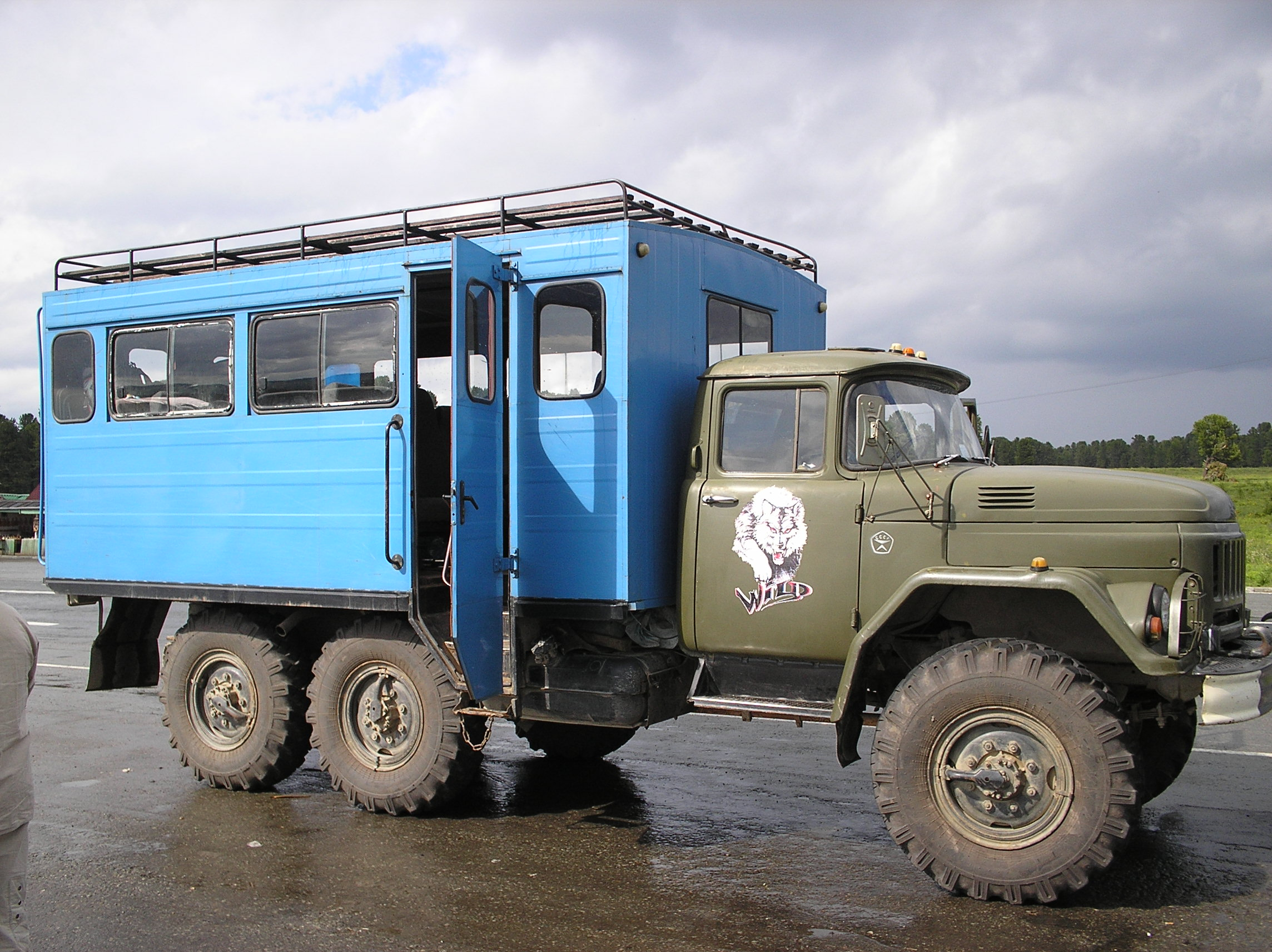
ZIL-131 shift bus

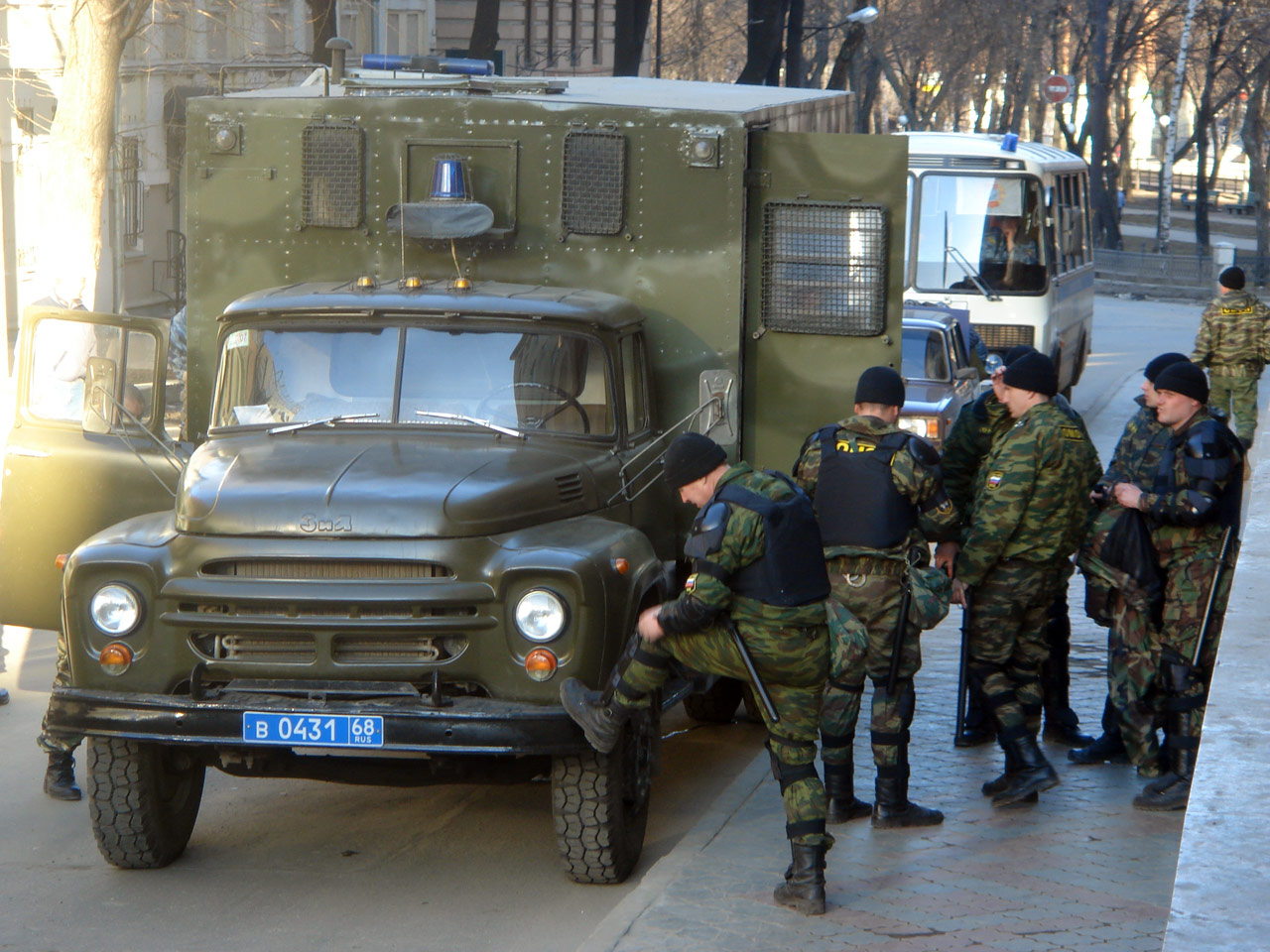
Tambov OMON units in Nizhny Novgorod with a "truck-bus" on a ZIL-130.

A combination bus, also called a truck bus or shift bus, is a purpose-built truck with a "passenger container" fulfilling the role of a bus. Such vehicles used to be common in developing countries. Alternative combination buses can be a passenger/cargo module/container mounted on a truck chassis, or a bus with a large open or closed in cargo area also known as a bruck.

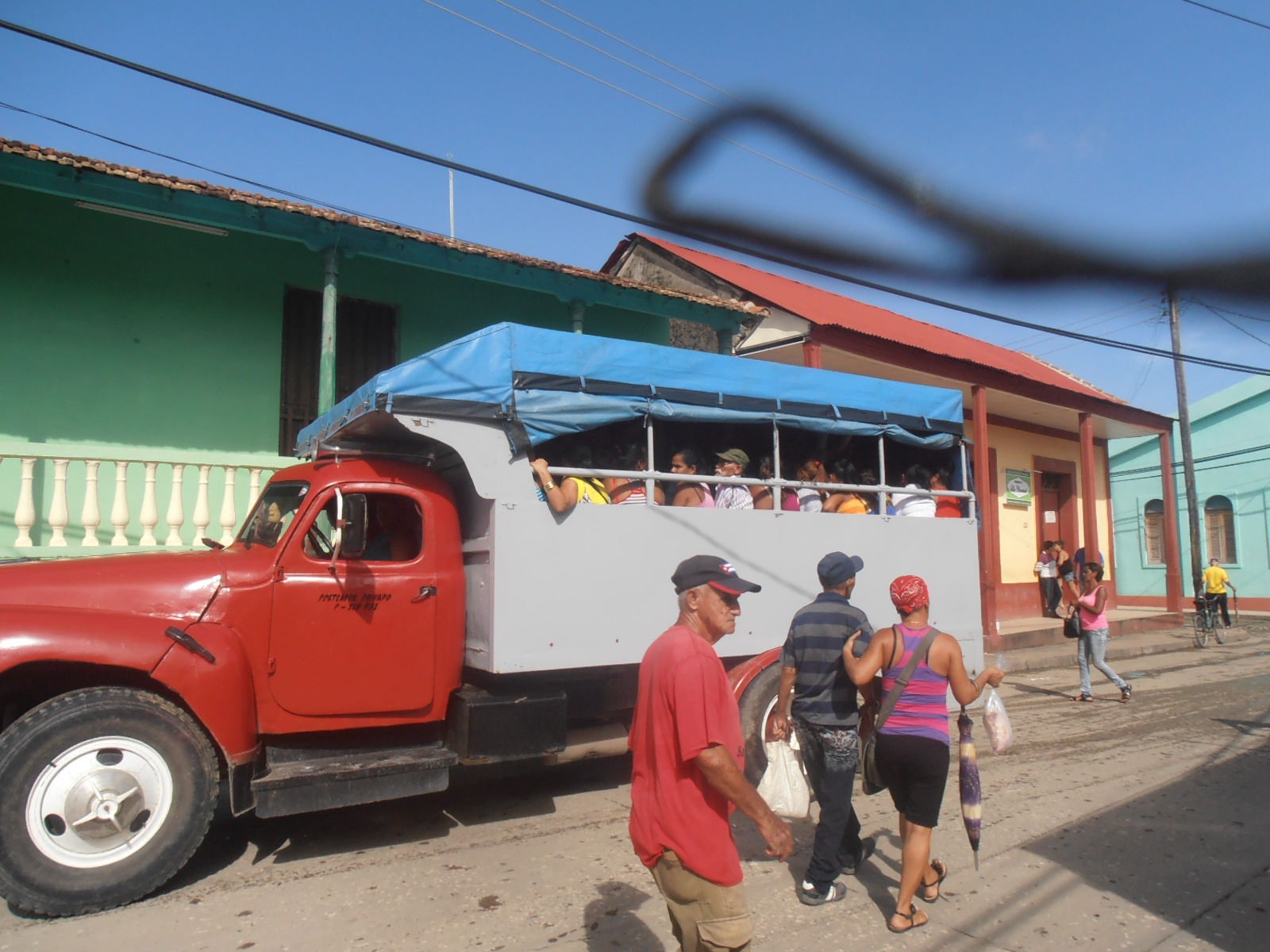
Chevrolet AK Series shift bus

Truck buses have been mainly used by the military, the police anti-riot units, public utilities, as school buses, and by state-owned companies on short routes for employees.

== Construction ==
Combination buses are built by installing a complete box body equipped for transporting people onto a truck chassis. The body is independent and separate from the driver. There is usually no passage between the cab and box body but there is usually an intercom system. The body is equipped with windows, a separate internal lighting and heating and/or air conditioning systems. Related bodies are different types of mobile workshops or specialized military superstructure. Passenger comfort is generally minimal.

Some companies such as Ha'argaz manufacture combination buses by installing a partial bus body on an all-wheel-drive truck chassis.

== Usage ==
Due to the minimum of comfort provided by the combination bus, they are suitable for transport over short distances only. Specifically, the distribution of workers in large workplaces under the open sky such as a large construction site, agricultural labor, quarries or surface mines. Often these vehicles built on off-road vehicle chassis. These vehicles are also used as police intervention units, commandos and anti-terrorism units.

Such shift buses are the most popular mode of transport in the field of oil mining. They allow one to leave quite far from populated areas, while it is relatively comfortable to transport the entire workforce with the possibility of spending the night. In some such trucks, sleeping places are provided, since the work shift can last up to a week, while this can happen in the conditions of a polar night with frost up to -50 degrees Celsius (-58 Fahrenheit). Powerful heating and insulation are installed in the salons.

== Gallery ==
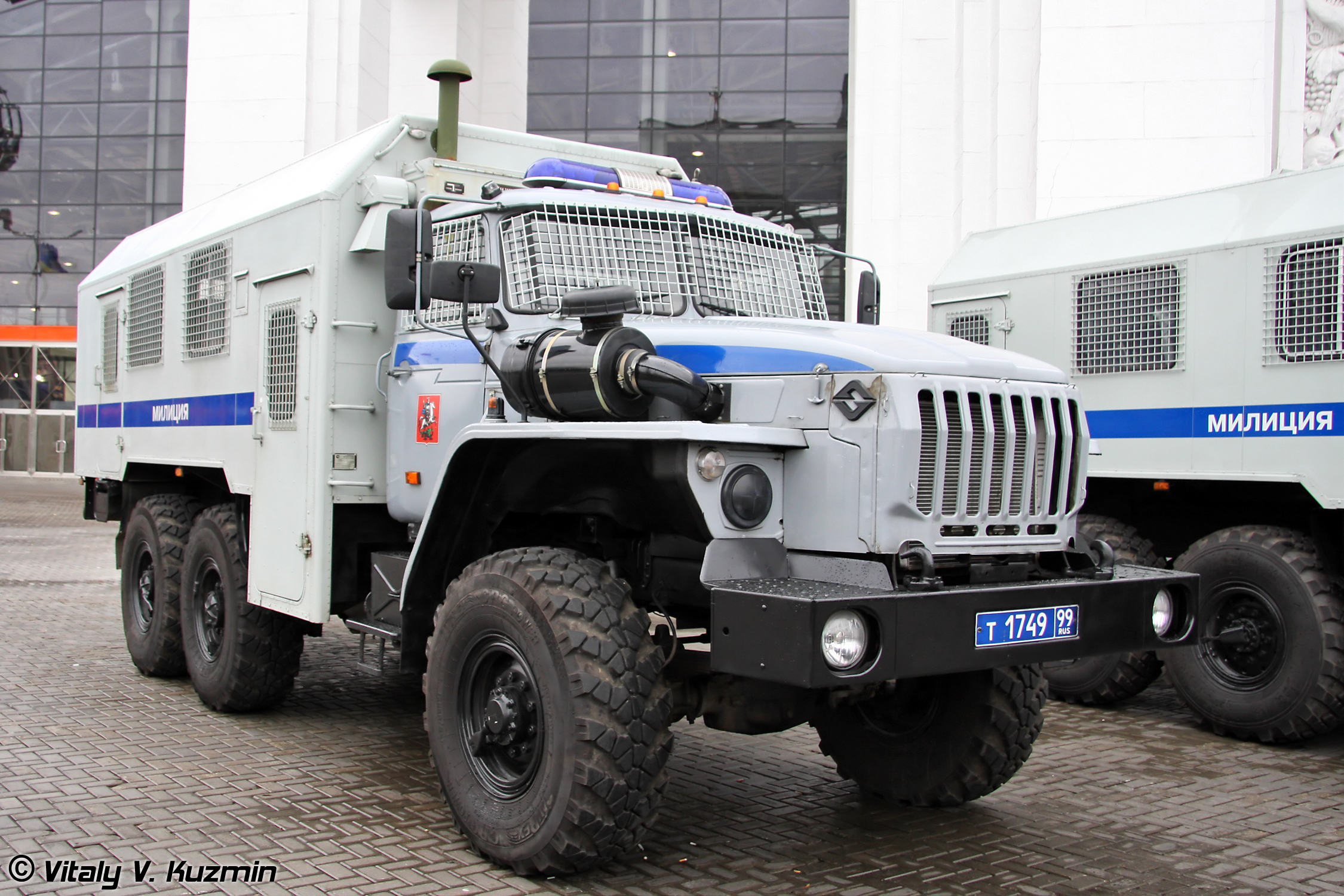
Russian Police Ural-572060 also known as VM-4320

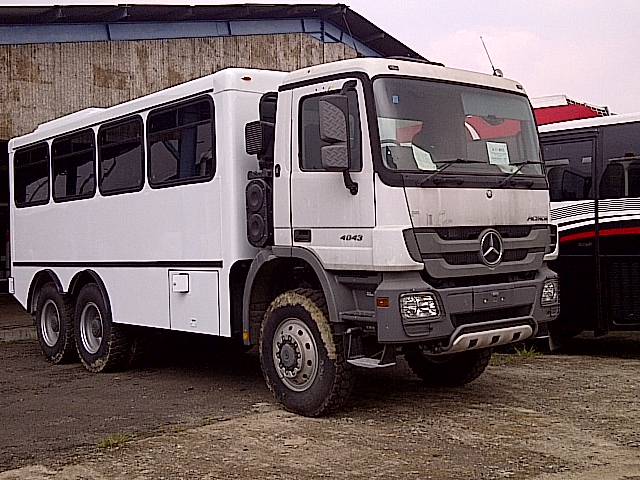
Cikupa manhauler

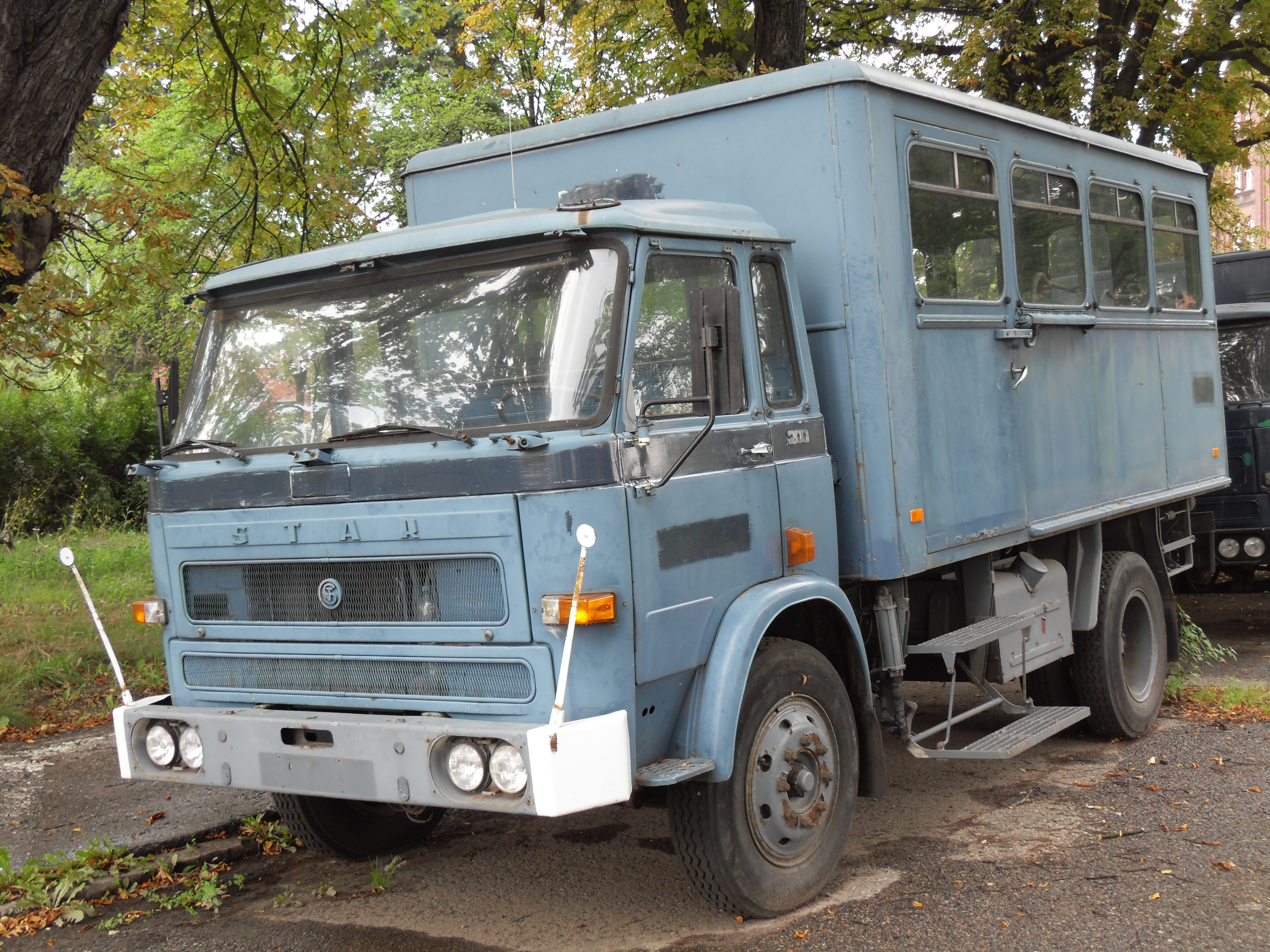
Star 200 truck with passengers bodywork for the Milicja in Poland.

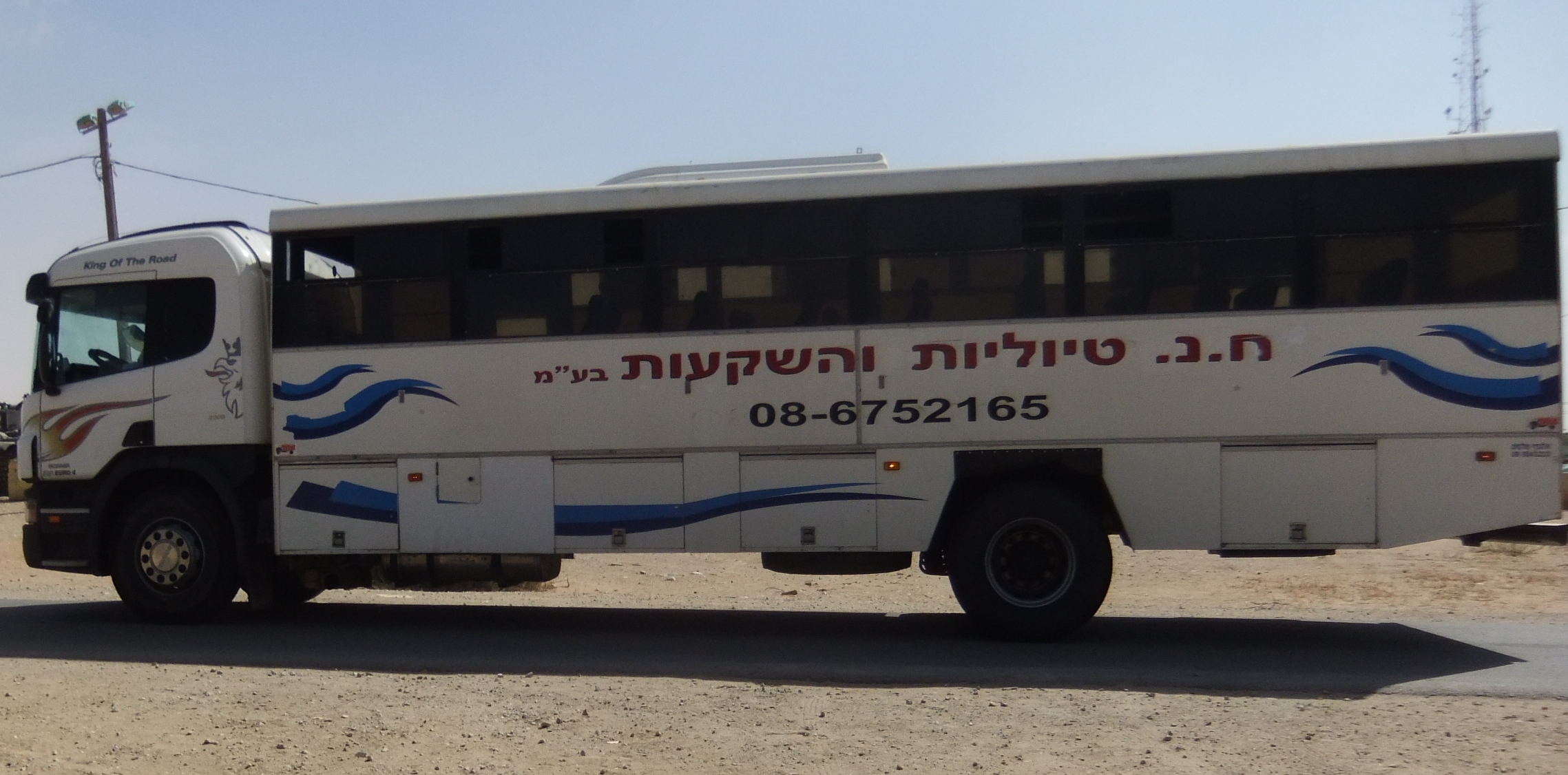
Modern Tiyulit (Hebrew for "trip truck") in Israel used for transporting IDF soldiers in open non-paved terrain.

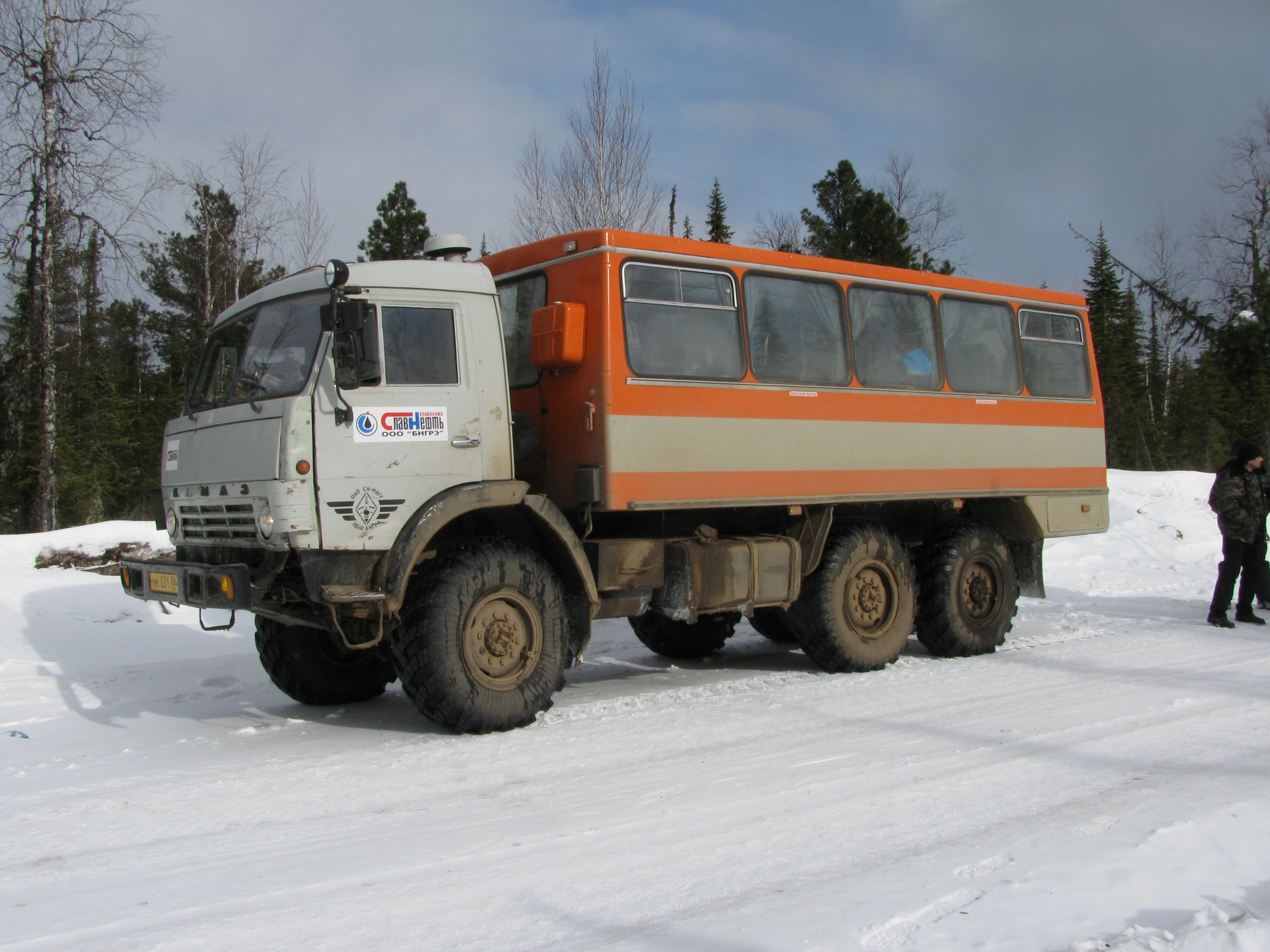
NefAZ-4208/4951 shift bus based on a KamAZ-44108.

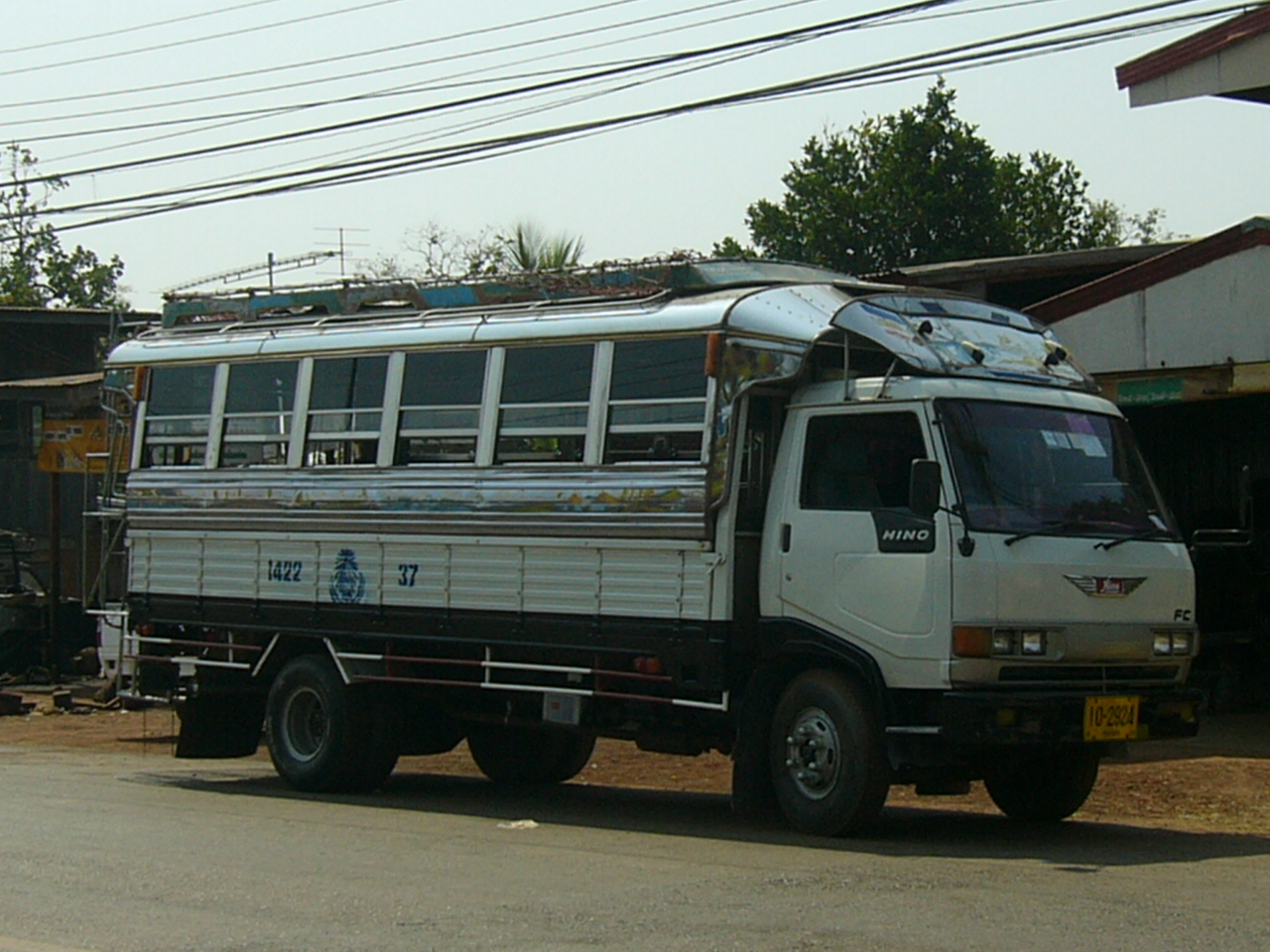
Medium-sized Hino Songthaew (truck bus) as seen in Sakon Nakhon, Thailand.

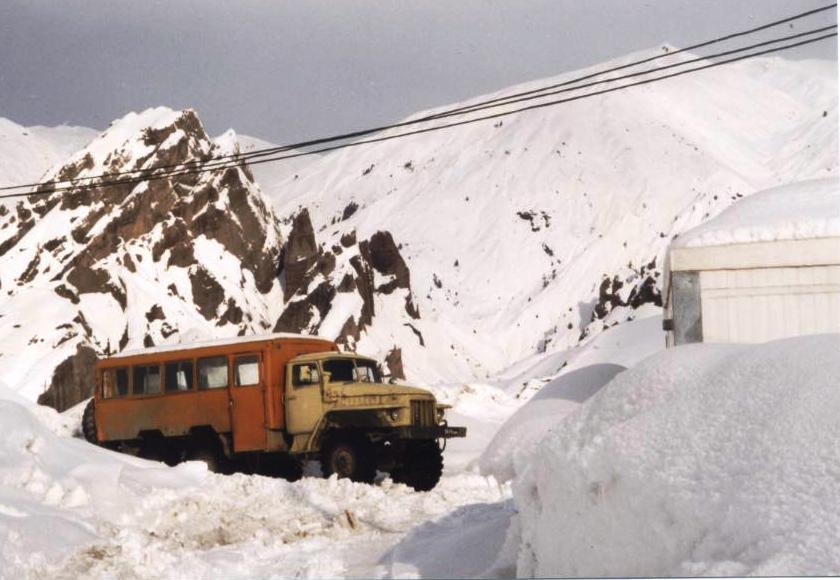
Ural-375D 'truckbus' in Tajikistan.

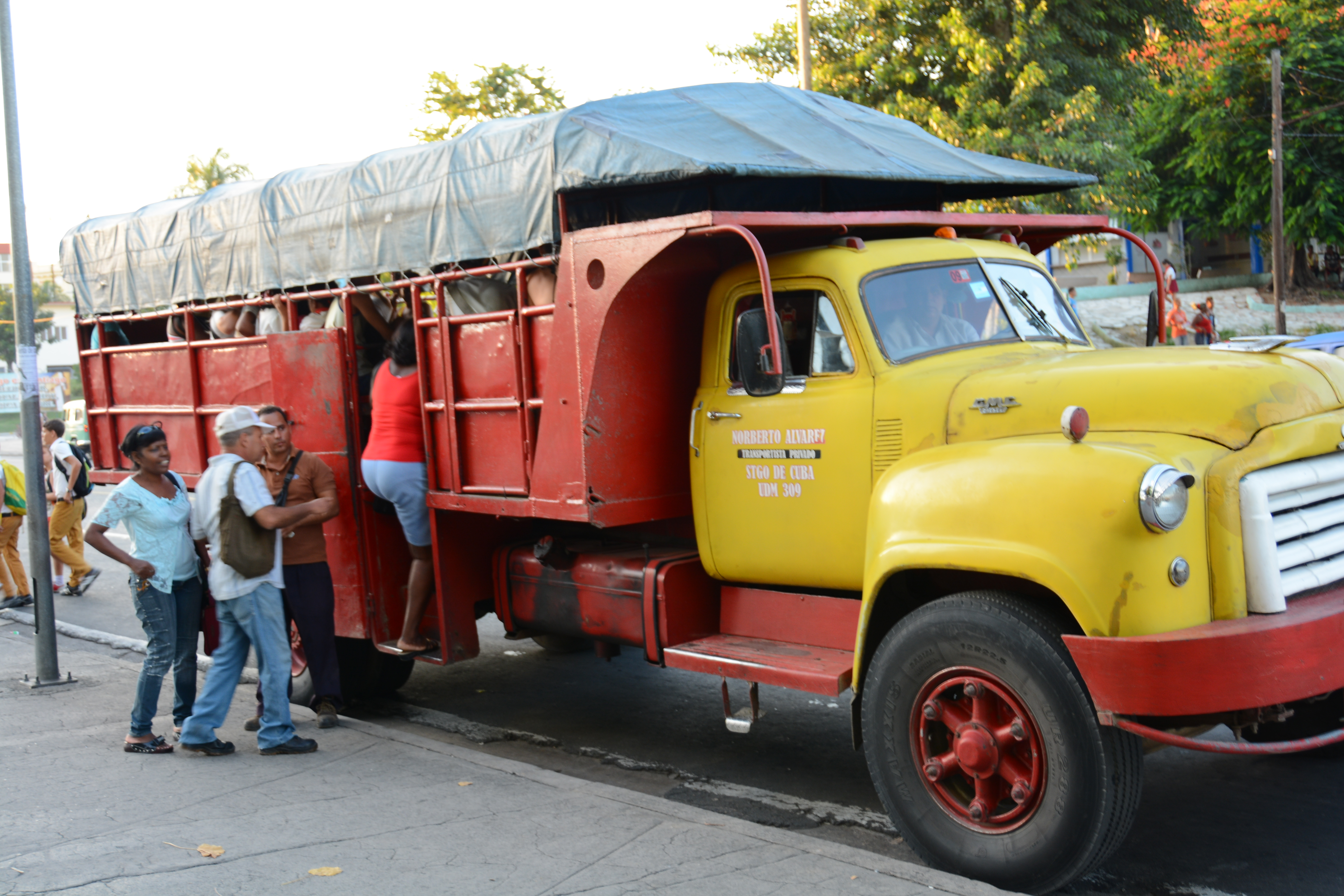
GMC New Design truckbus

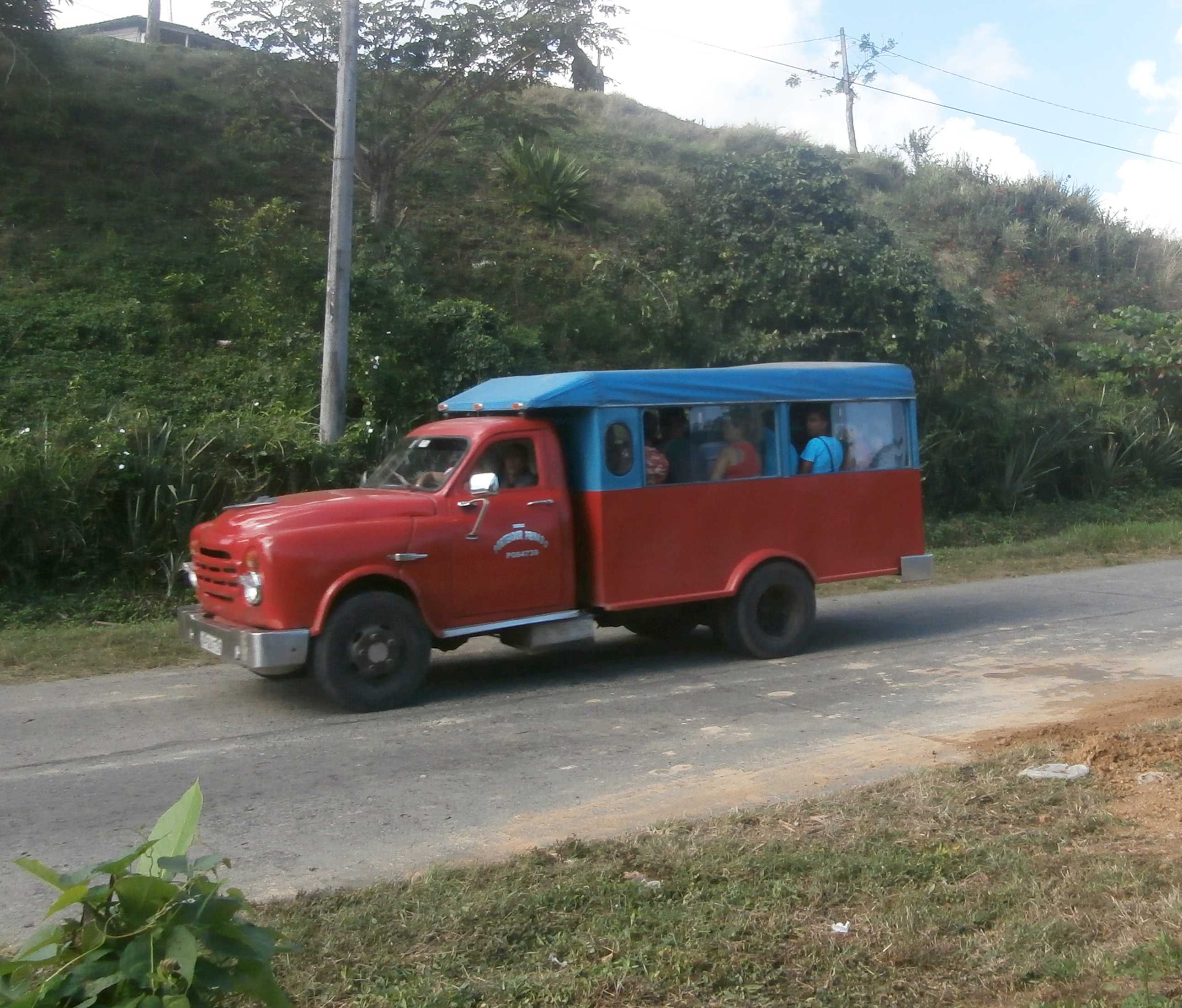
Opel Blitz combination bus

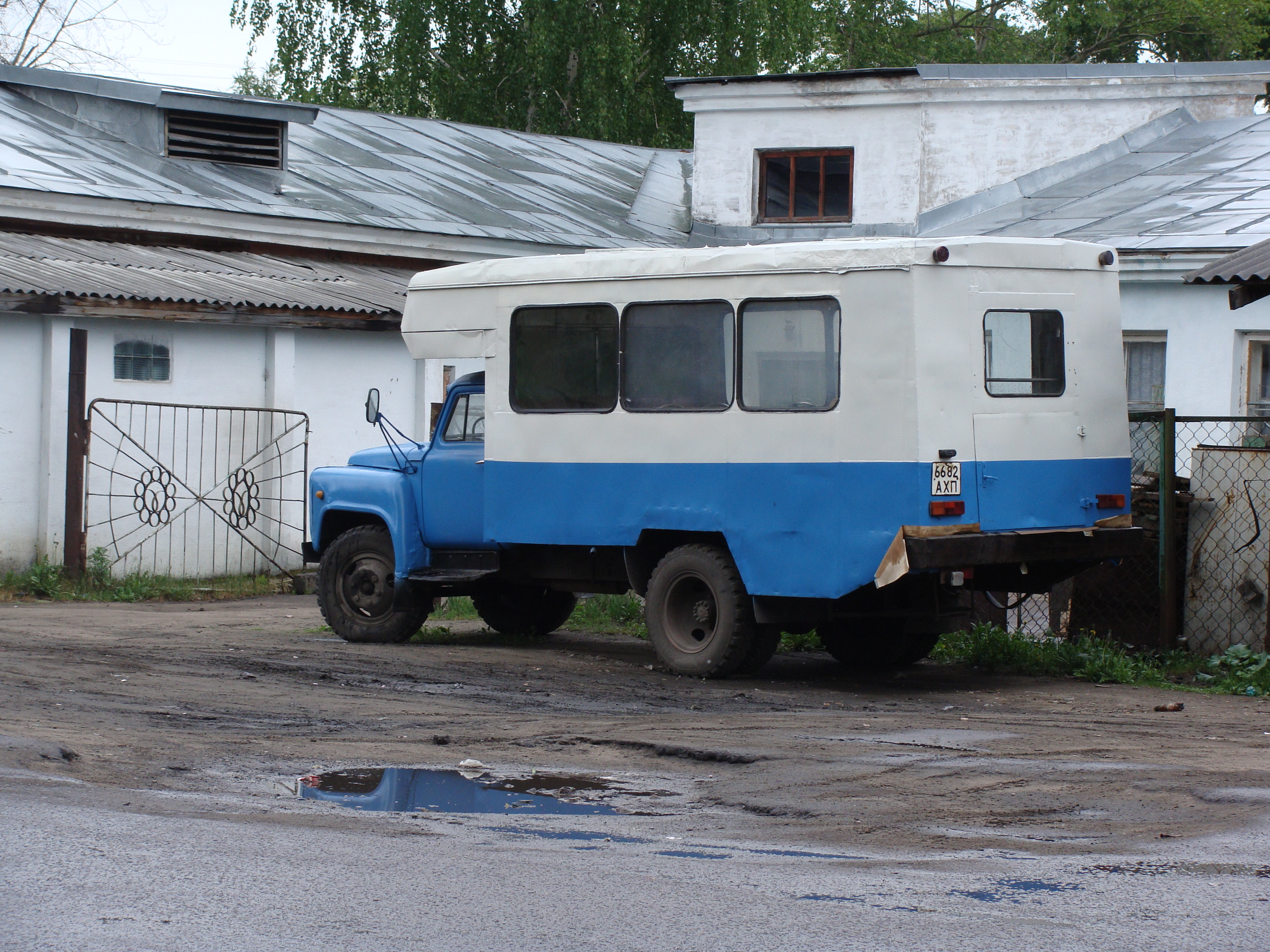
GAZ combination bus

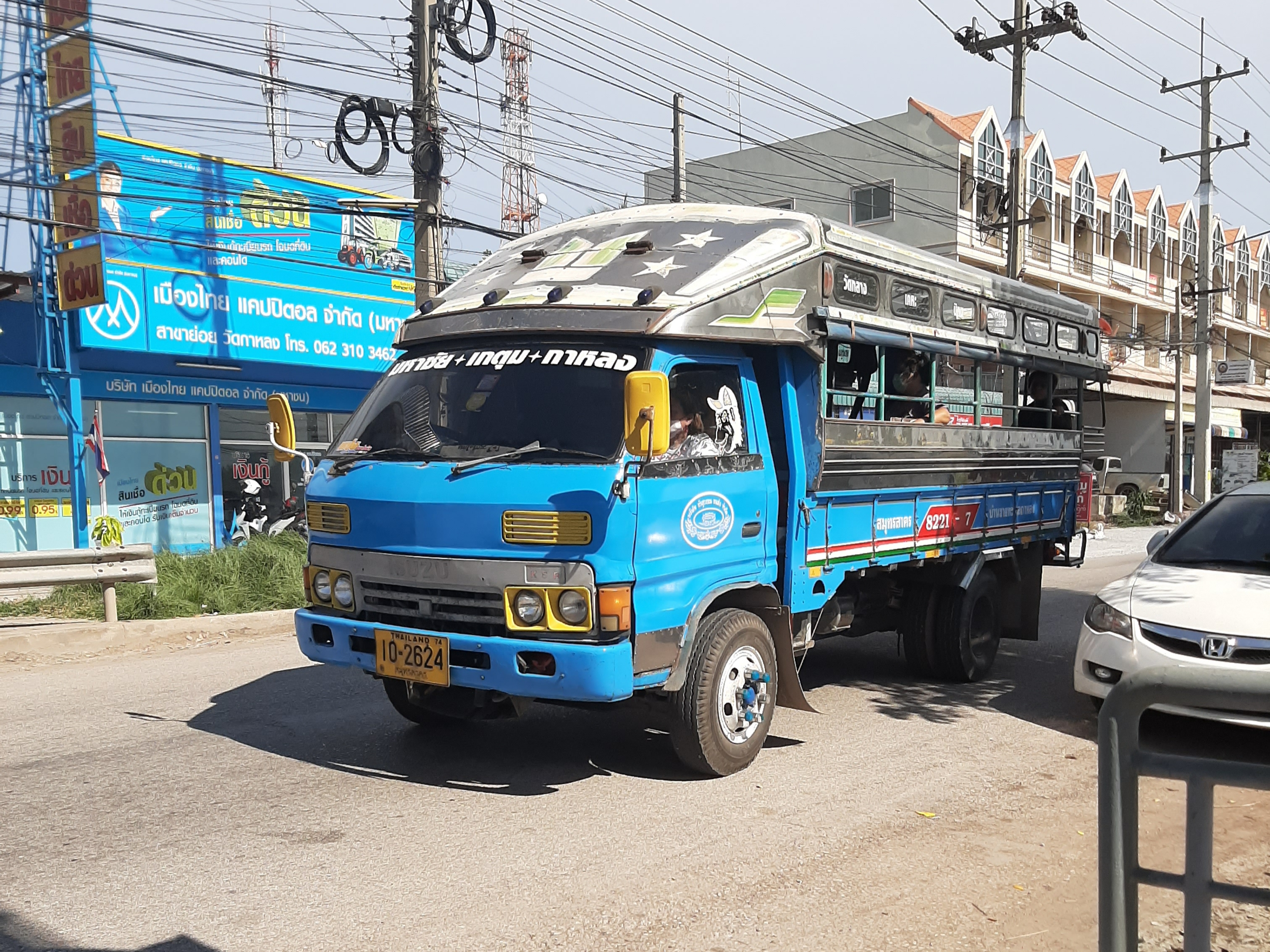
Medium-sized Isuzu Songthaew (truck bus) as seen in Samut Sakhon, Thailand.

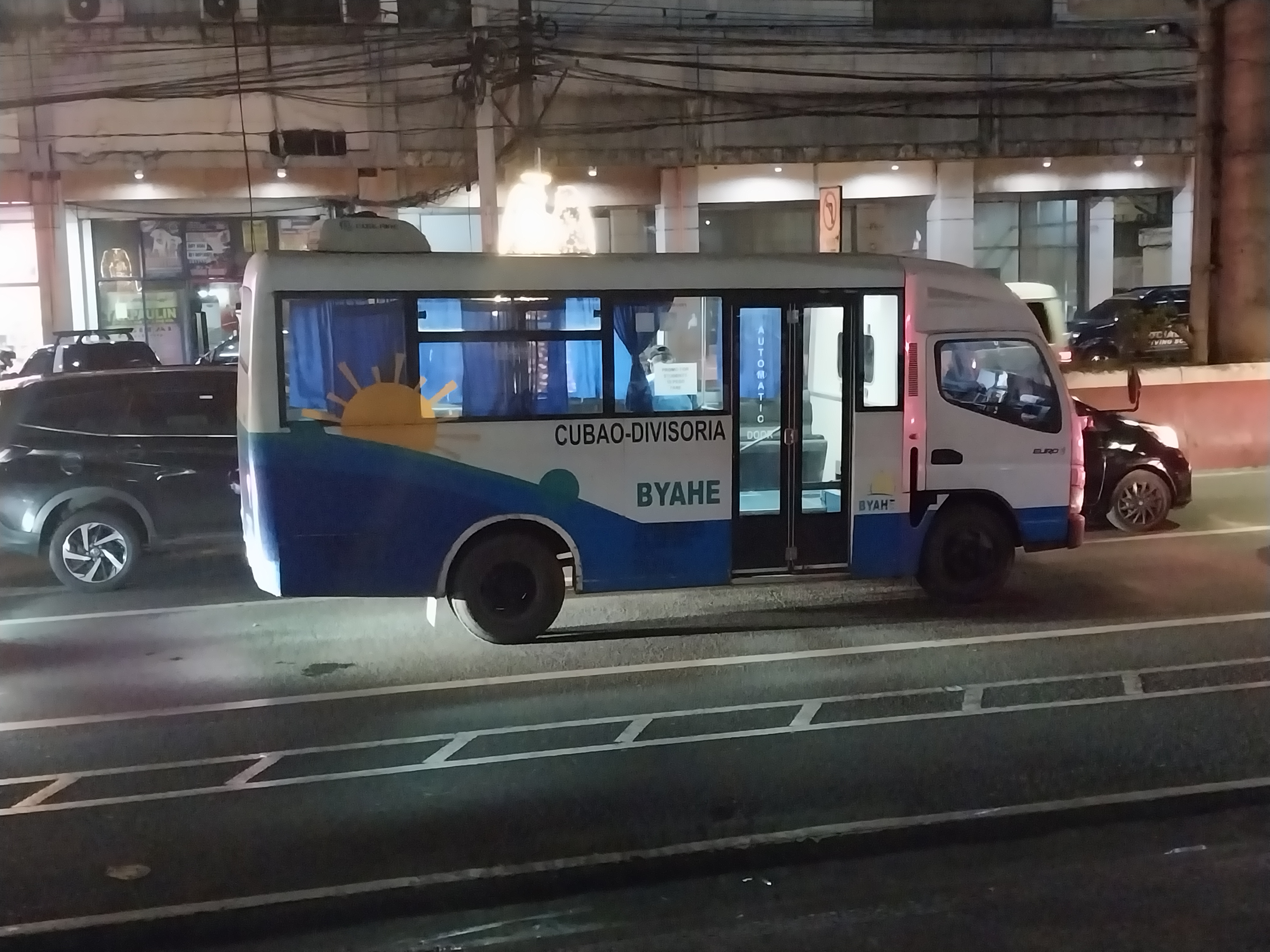
Almazora bodied Fuso Canter Modern PUV, Philippines

== See also ==
- Jeepney
- Trailer bus
- List of buses
