= Toppola =

Brand of camper shell

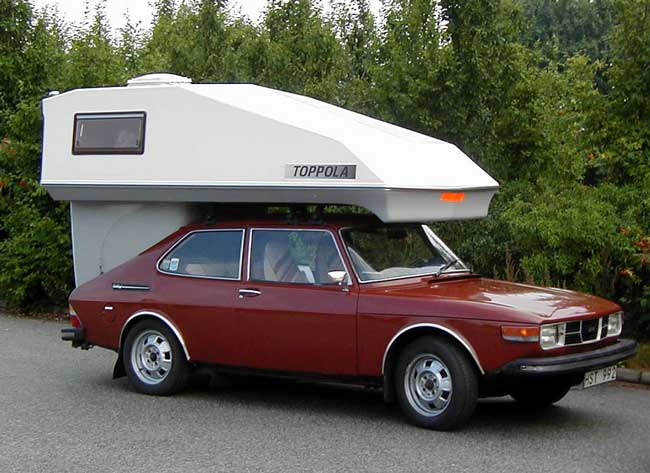
Toppola fitted to a 1975 Saab 99L combi coupé.

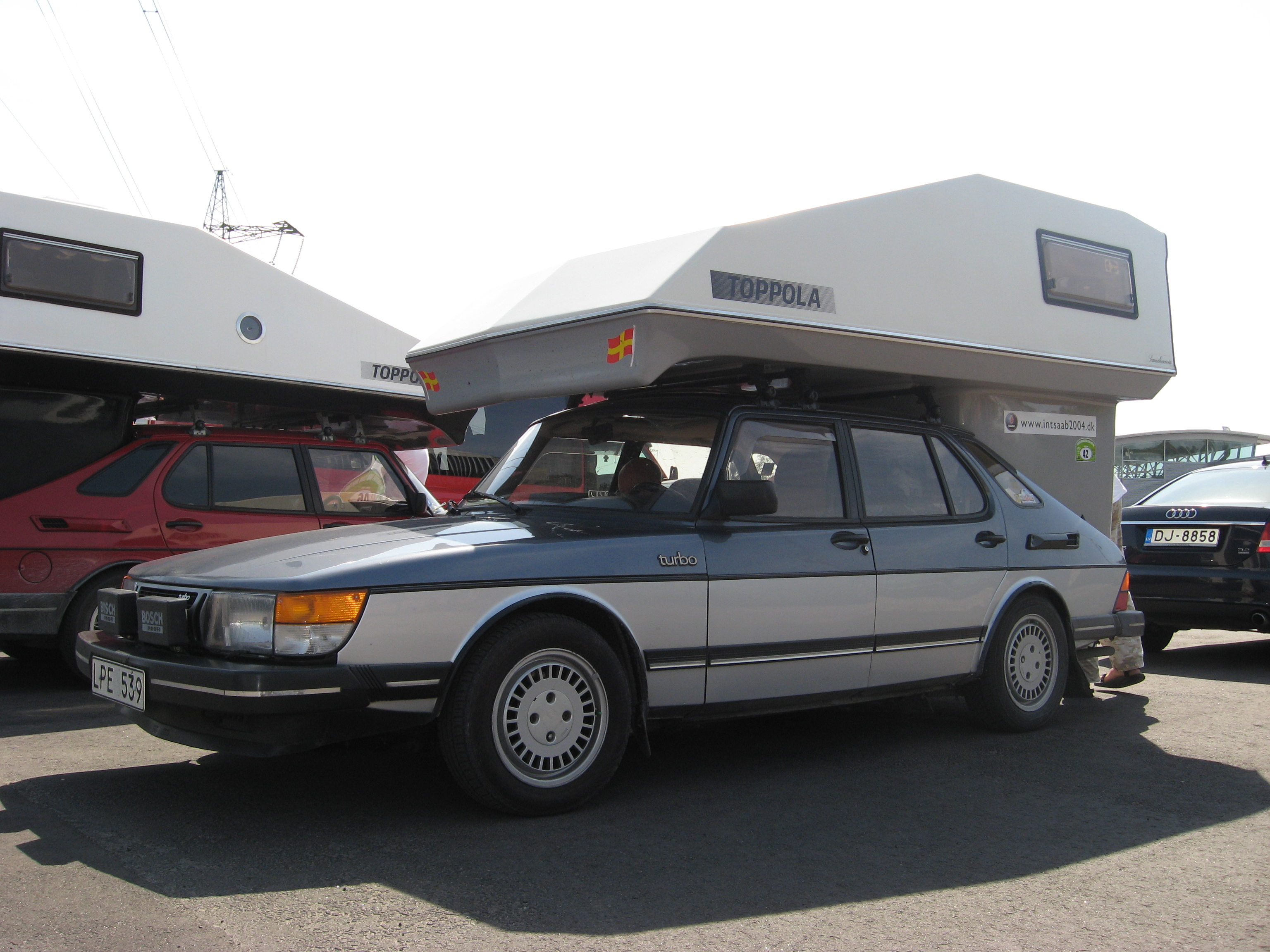
Toppola on a Saab 900 'Lux' .

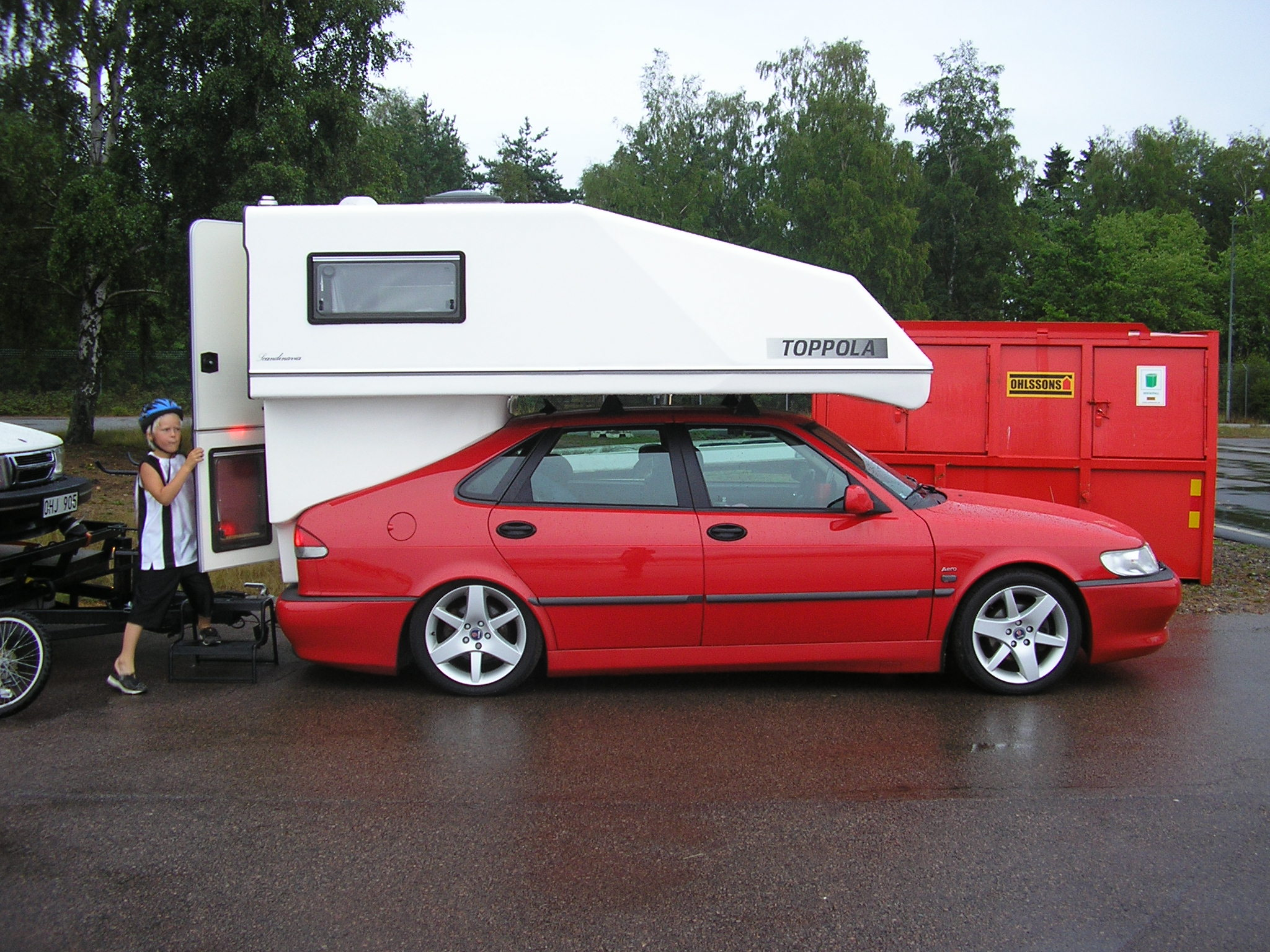
A Saab 9-3 with the last Toppola ever made.

Toppola is a brand of camper shell originally made for the Saab 99 combi coupé. By removing the hatch and putting on the Toppola, a car could be converted to a campervan in about 15 to 30 minutes. The top can be lifted off and the hatch door reattached, so the car can be used without the Toppola. The unit is small, but features full standing height 2.0 m (6.6 ft) and a 170 by 200 cm (67 by 79 in) bed. It could be fitted with a complete kitchen and a heater for use during winter. The total weight addition is about 115 kg (254 lb).

== History ==
The Toppola was designed by Finnish-born Arwo Pullola. In 1982 Peter Malmberg bought the design from Pullola and founded the company Emico AB. The name Toppola was derived from the Swedish name TOPP (top) and the last name of the inventor OLA (Pullola).

The Toppola was first made for the Saab 99, but later also Saab 900, Saab 900 (NG) and Saab 9000. Around mid-80s Emico AB realized they were not able to supply the demand as SAAB wanted to offer it as an dealership option for the new Saab 9000, and production was halted.

In 1986 the rights for the Toppola was transferred to a new company founded by Peter Malmberg called SCANDO, to free himself from the growing pressure by SAAB company. They tried to globalize the design, and attempted to make variants for the new Saab 9-3, but also for mass-market cars like Ford Sierra and Scorpio.

Production stopped in 2006 as the low volume of the Toppola was stretched over numerous variants.
