= KUNG =

Type of Russian vehicle module

KUNG is the English transcription of the Cyrillic initialism КУНГ (Russian: кузов универсальный нулевого (нормального) габарита, romanized: kuzov universal'nyy nulevogo (normal'nogo) gabarita, lit. 'universal body of zero [standard] dimension'). The KUNG was a Soviet, then Russian, term for a standardized military vehicle module/trailer system.

The most widespread standard frame-metal body-van is assembled from steel angles and angle bars, steering aluminum sheets outside, but inside - impregnated varnished plywood. The voids between the sheathing panels are filled with insulating foam. All bodies, regardless of specialization are supplied with heating, ventilation, lighting and ceiling light household equipment. KUNGs are manufactured for installation on the chassis of GAZ-63, ZIL-157, GAZ-66, ZIL-131, KamAZ-4310, Ural-375, Ural-4320. Versions for different vehicles are standardized with the same type of items and equipment.

KUNG body type: wood and metal, insulated, sealed, heated, and designed for placement of personnel, repair shops, electronic systems, health centers, etc.

The term is also used informally to refer to camper shells—an accessory metal or fiberglass roof for civilian vehicles.

== Gallery ==
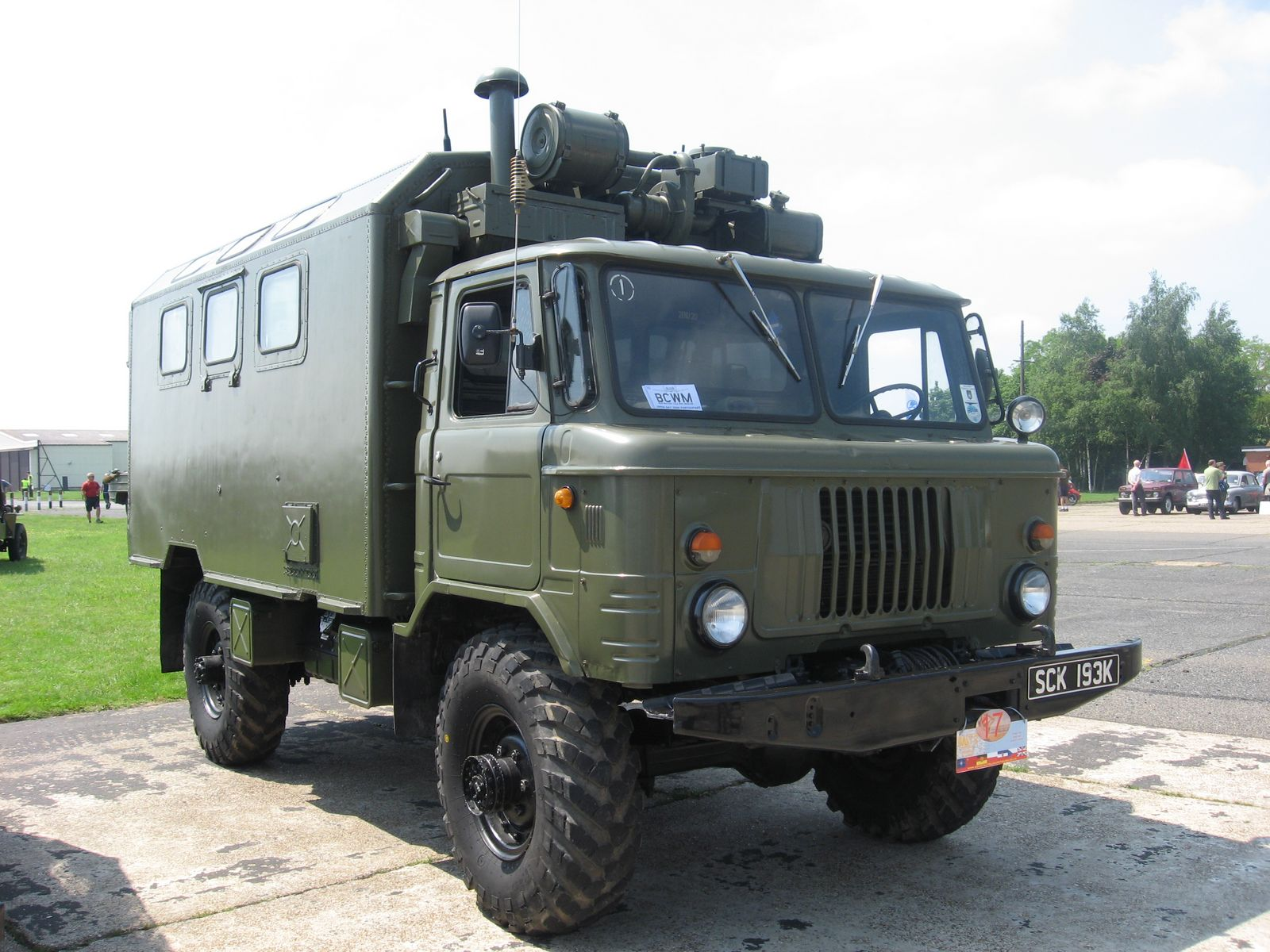
GAZ-66 with KUNG

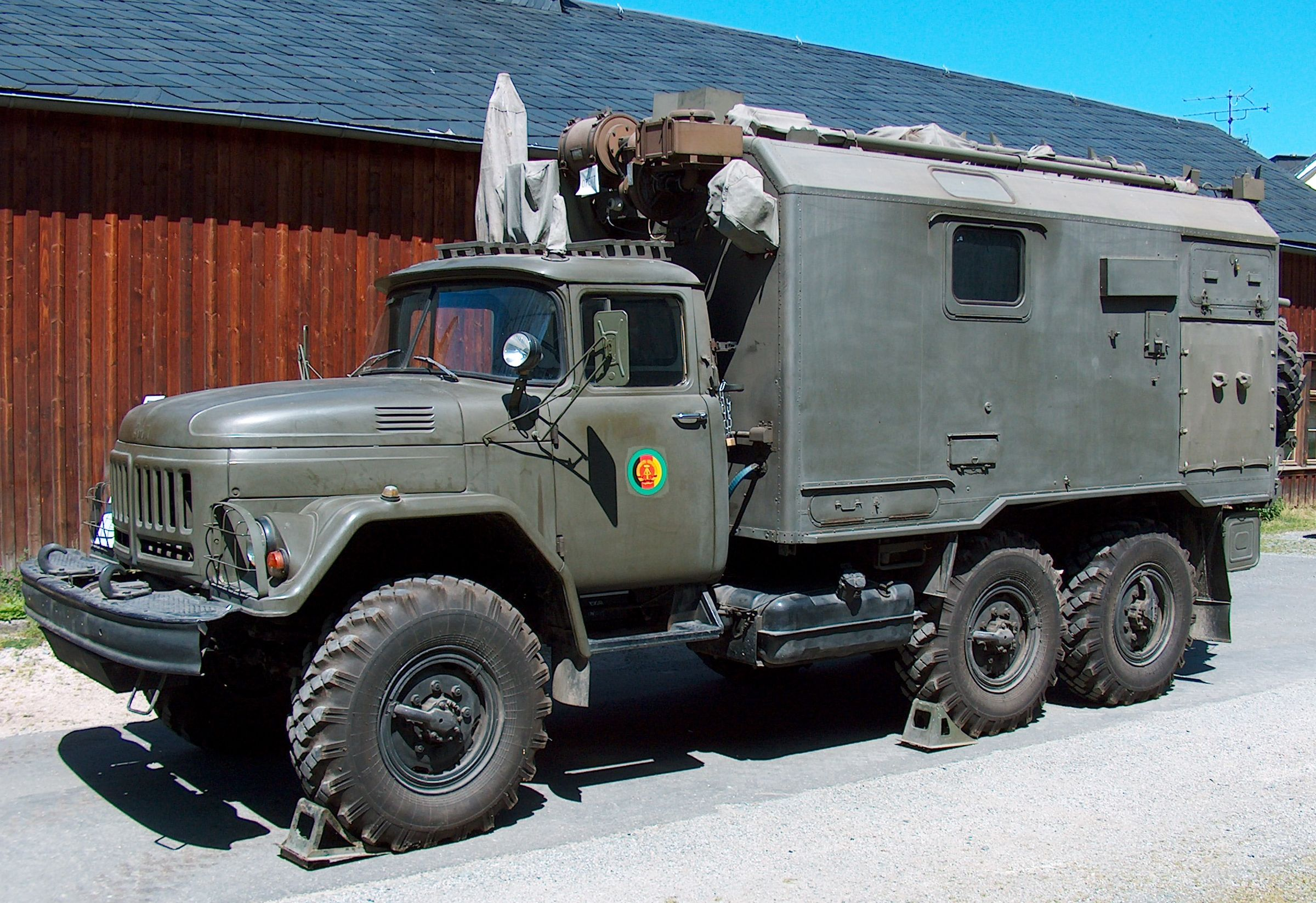
ZIL-131 with KUNG

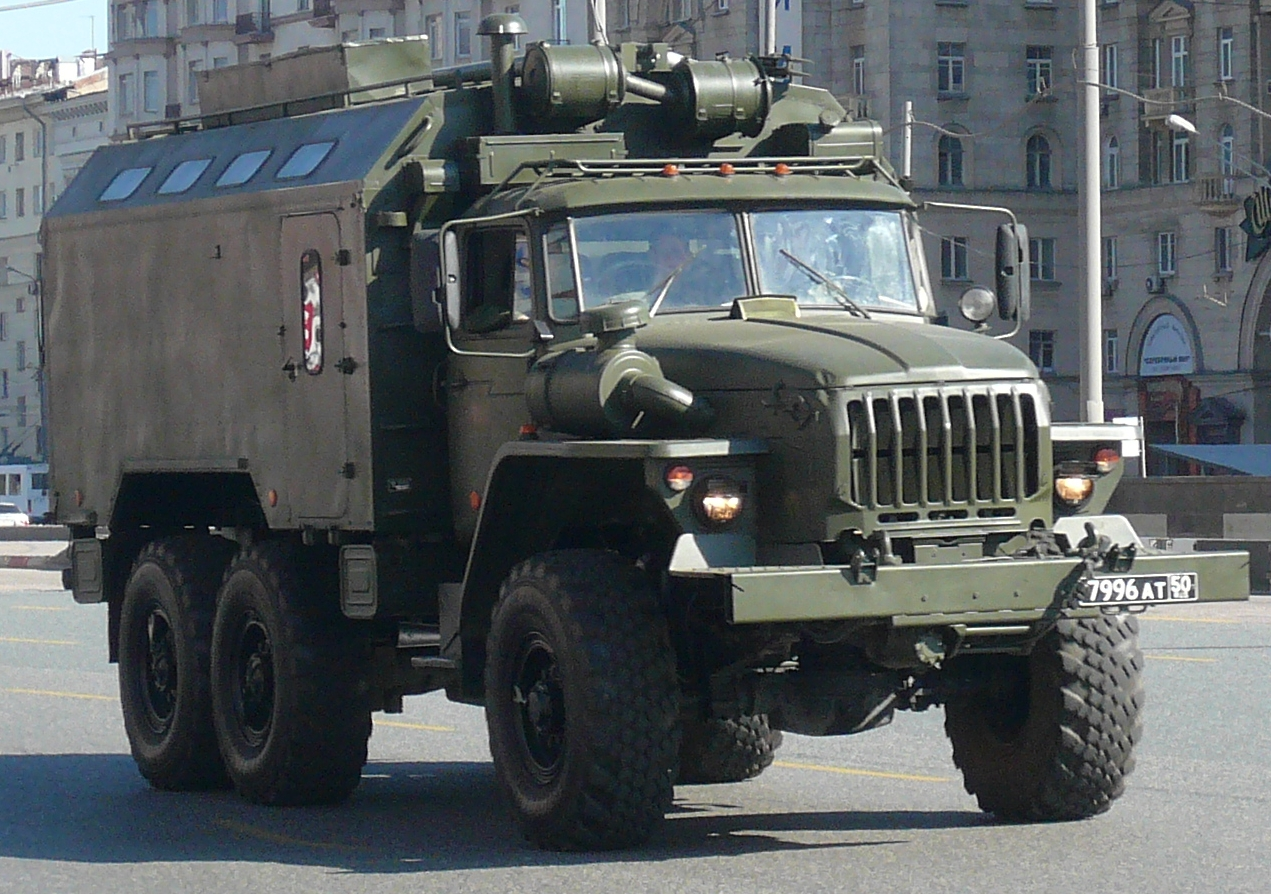
Ural-4320 with KUNG

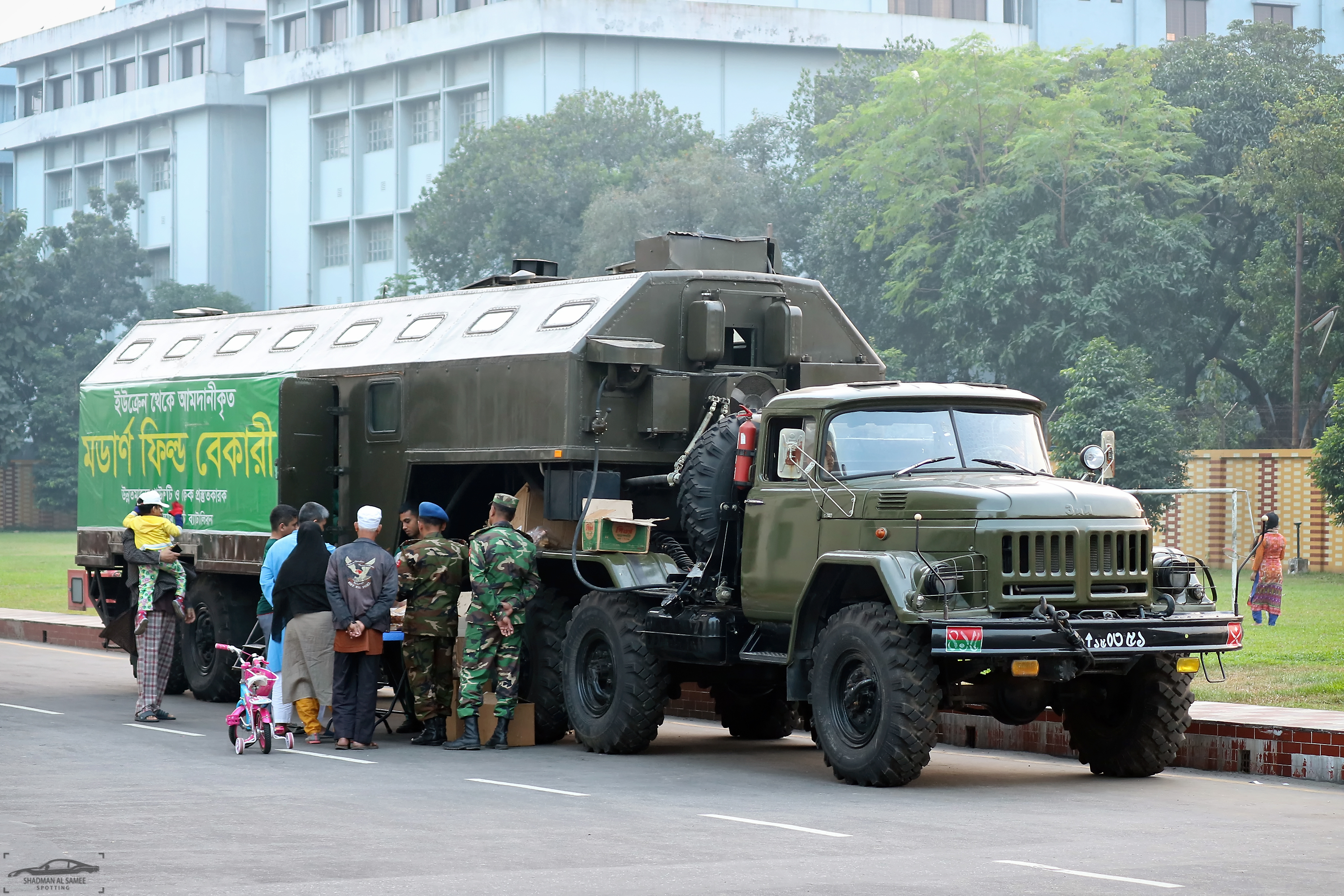
ZIL-137 tractor with KUNG trailer
