= Ural-4320 =

Russian 6x6 off-road truck

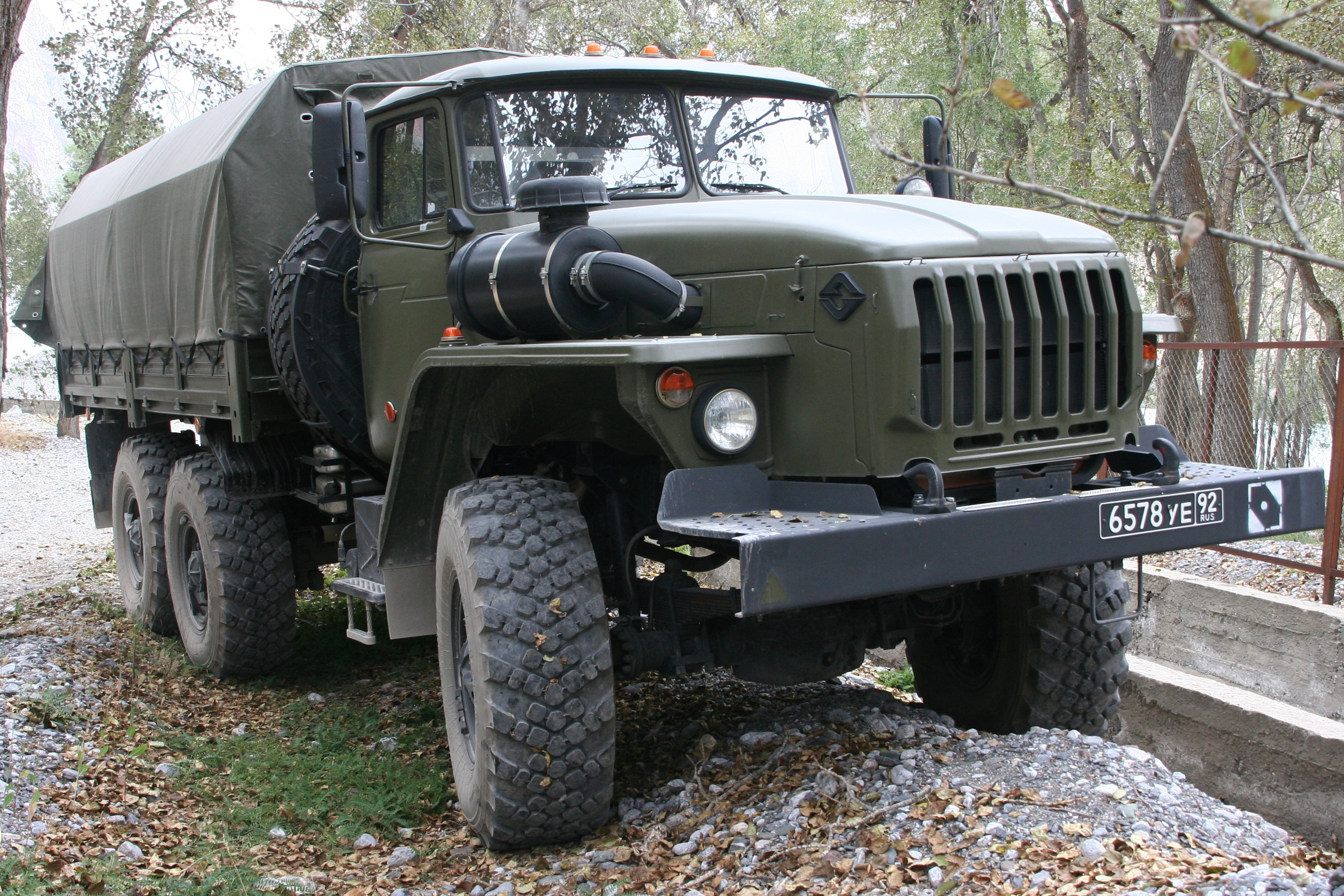
- Ural-4320

Overview
- Manufacturer: Ural Automotive Plant
- Production: 1977–present
- Assembly: Soviet Union / Russia: Miass

Body and chassis
- Class: Truck
- Layout: AWD 6×6

Powertrain
- Engine: 11.2L YaMZ-236M2 V6 turbo diesel 14.9L YaMZ-238M2 V8 diesel
- Transmission: 5-speed manual

Dimensions
- Length: 7,366 mm (290.0 in)
- Width: 2,500 mm (98.4 in)
- Height: 2,715 mm (106.9 in); 3,005 mm (118.3 in) (with tent)

Chronology
- Predecessor: Ural-375D

The Ural-4320 is a general purpose off-road 6×6 vehicle, produced at the Ural Automotive Plant in Miass, Russia for use by the Russian Army. The wheel arrangement for the Ural-4320 was designed for transporting cargo, people and trailers on all types of roads and terrain. It also serves as a launching platform for the BM-21 "Grad" rocket launcher.

== Gallery ==
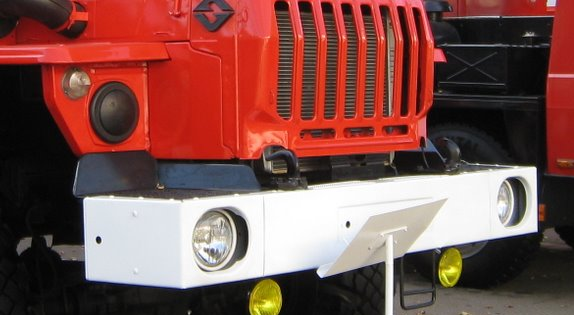
Ural-4320 with headlights in bumper (civilian version since the mid-1990s)

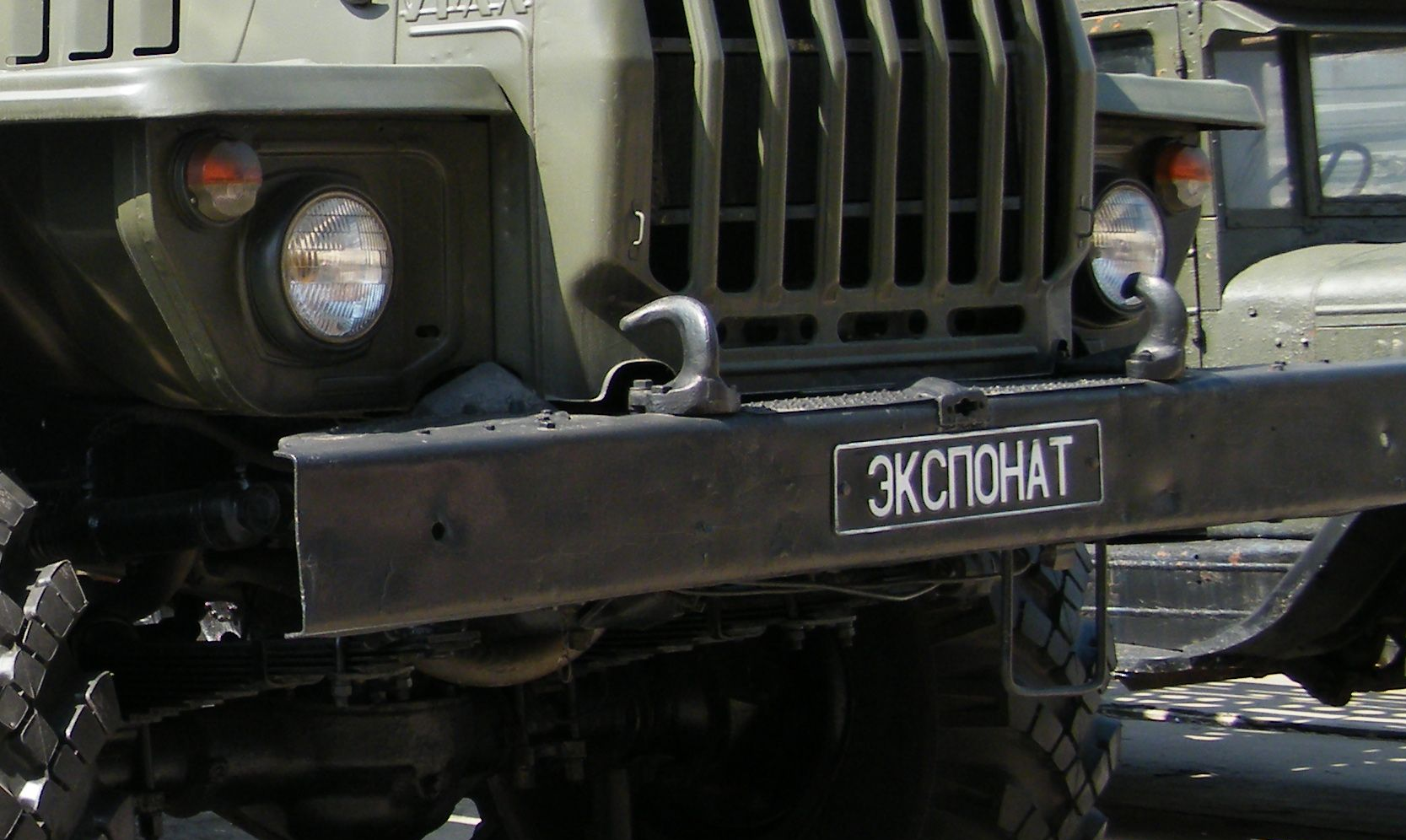
Ural-4320 with headlights in wings (civilian and military versions before the mid-1990s)

== Specifications ==
Ural-4320 truck specifications
	YaMZ-238M2 engine	YaMZ-236M2 engine
Cab design:	Forward-mounted engine	
Seating capacity (in cab):	3	3
GVWR:	15,300 kg (33,750lb)	14,975 kg (33,000lb)
Weight of load carried:	6,000 kg (13,200 lb)	5,000 kg (11,000 lb)
Suspension:	solid axles, leaf springs, rear wheels at balance-cart	
GVWR of towed trailer:	11,500 kg (25,350 lb)	
Top speed:	82 km/h (51 mph)	75 km/h (47 mph)
Engine: liquid-cooled	V8 diesel	V6 diesel
Power:	240 PS (177 kW)	180 PS (132 kW)
Transmission:	Manual, Five forward, One reverse, two-speed distributor gearbox with interaxle locked differential.	
Body:	metal, with tailgate, removable bows and a canopy, two foldable side and one removable middle benches.	
Seating capacity:	27	27
Tires:	with controlled air pressure OI-25 14.00-20 HC(PR)14	

Early versions of the Ural-4320 were fitted with the KamAZ-740 V8 diesel engine, ohv, displacement 10,857 cc (bore/stroke ratio 120 mm (4.72 in)), compression ratio 16:1. Power 210 PS (154 kW; 207 hp) at 2,600 rpm. Torque 640 N⋅m (470 lb⋅ft) at 1,500 rpm.

== Versions ==
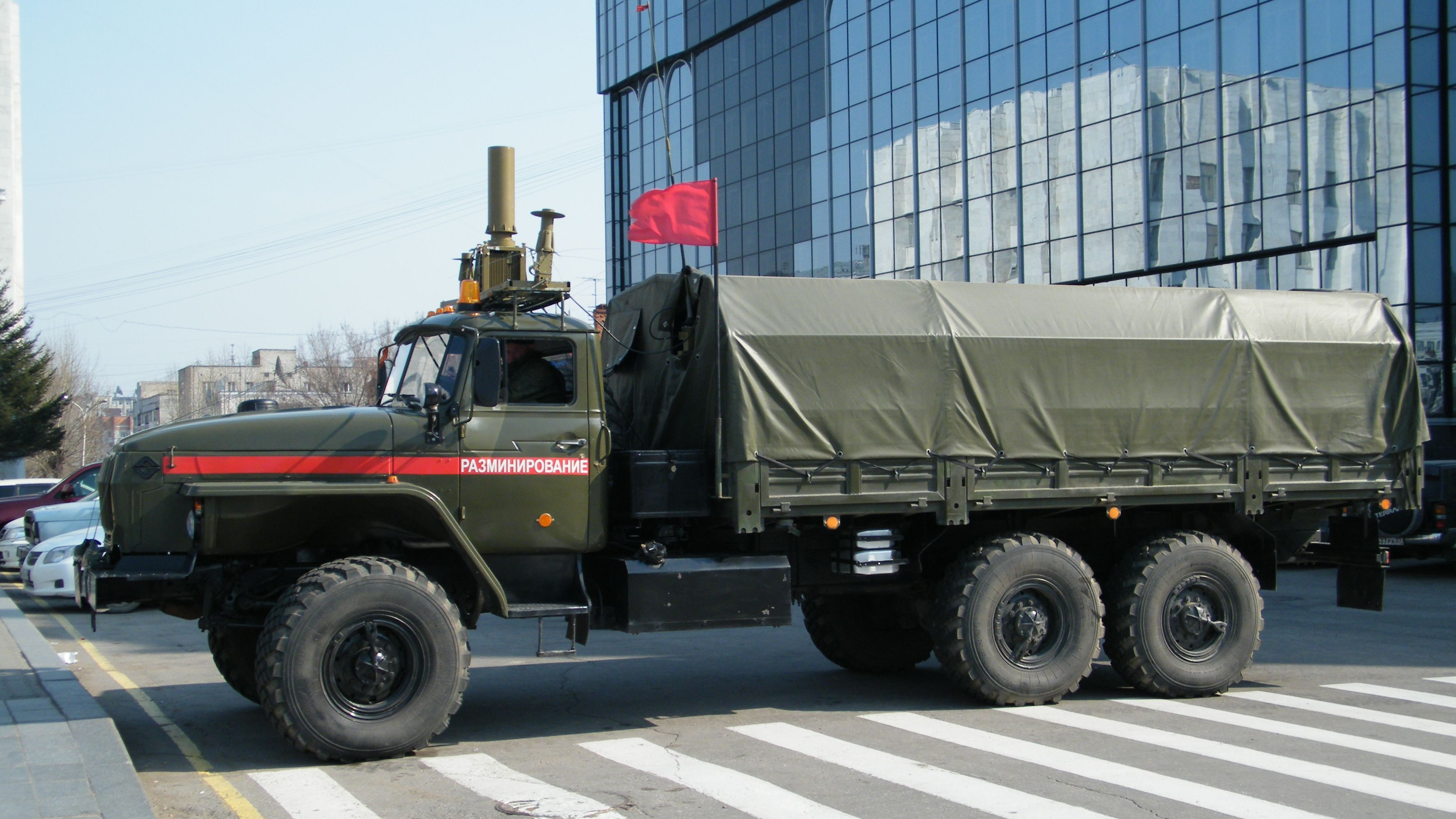
Ural-4320-19

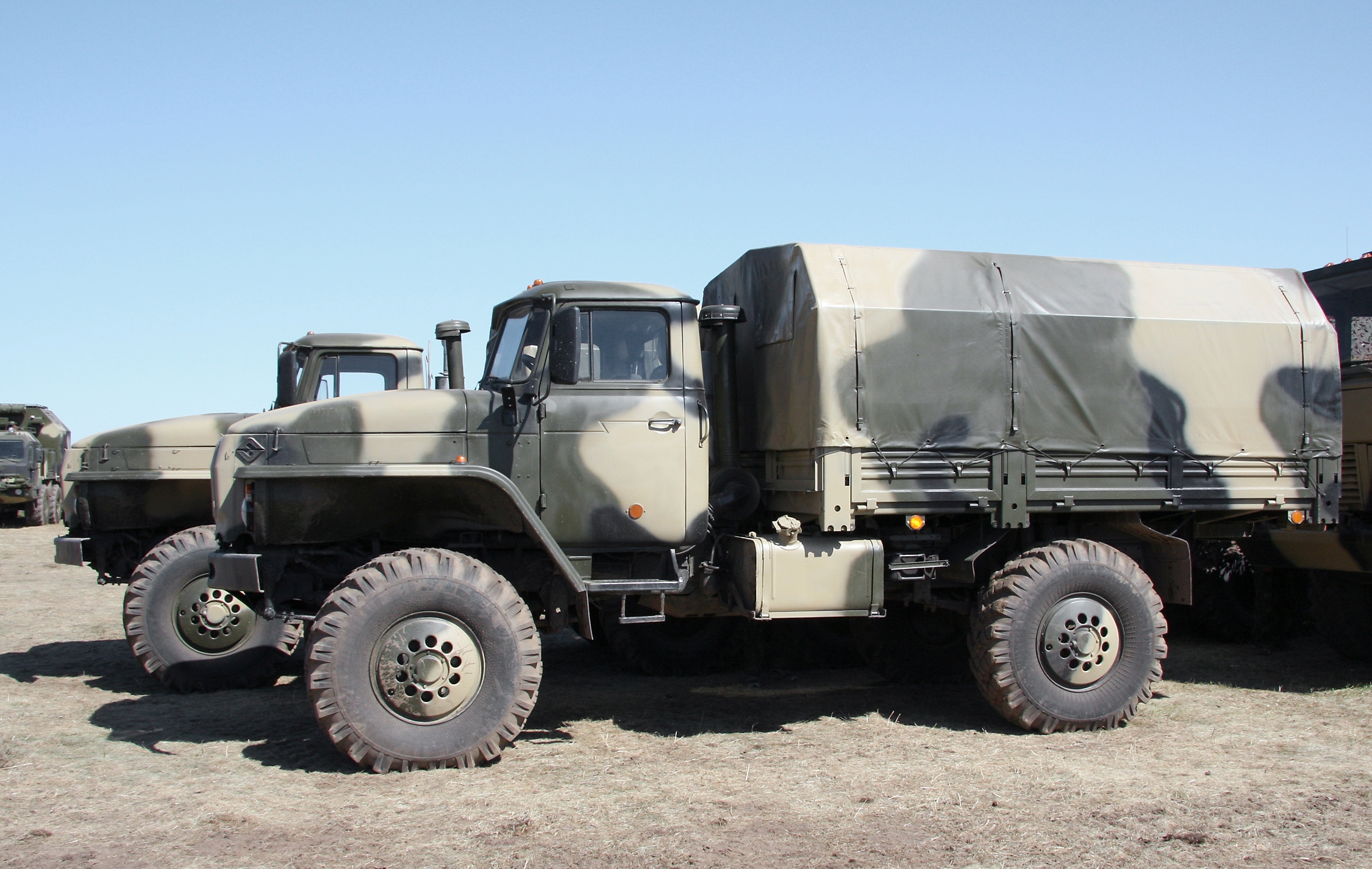
Ural-43206 4×4

- Ural-4320-**** - ** - chassis with the standard ("classic") metal cab and a carrying capacity of about 7.9 tons.
  - Ural-4320-19 ** - ** - LONG CHASSIS, capacity about 12 tons.
  - Ural-43203-**** - ** - chassis with reinforced front suspension.
  - Ural-43204-**** - ** - reinforced truck chassis, increased payload.
  - Ural-43206- 4×4 variant with a 180 hp YaMZ-236 diesel and a capacity of 4200 kg.
    - Ural-43206-41" - with the 230 hp YaMZ-236NE2 turbodiesel.
    - Ural-43206-0551" - 4×4 variant with a 4-door cab and carrying capacity 3600 kg.
- Ural-43202-**** - ** - truck tractor with semi-trailer for use on all types of roads.
- Ural-5557/55571- **** - ** - chassis for the installation of production equipment and special installations mass of ~ 12–14 m wide with low-profile tires with CTIS, which significantly increases the permeability of the vehicle.

Cab and tail options:

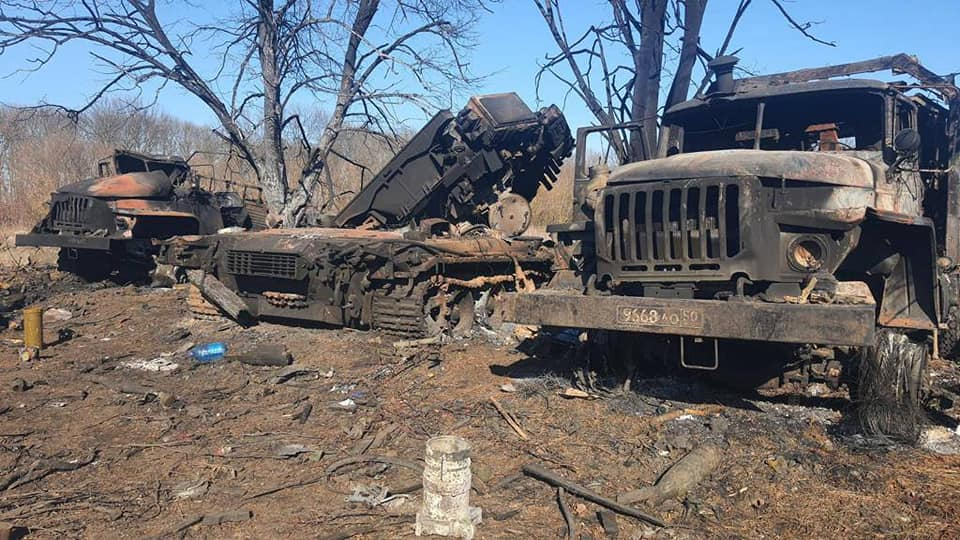
Destroyed Russian Ural-4320's near Trostianets, during the Russian invasion of Ukraine in 2022

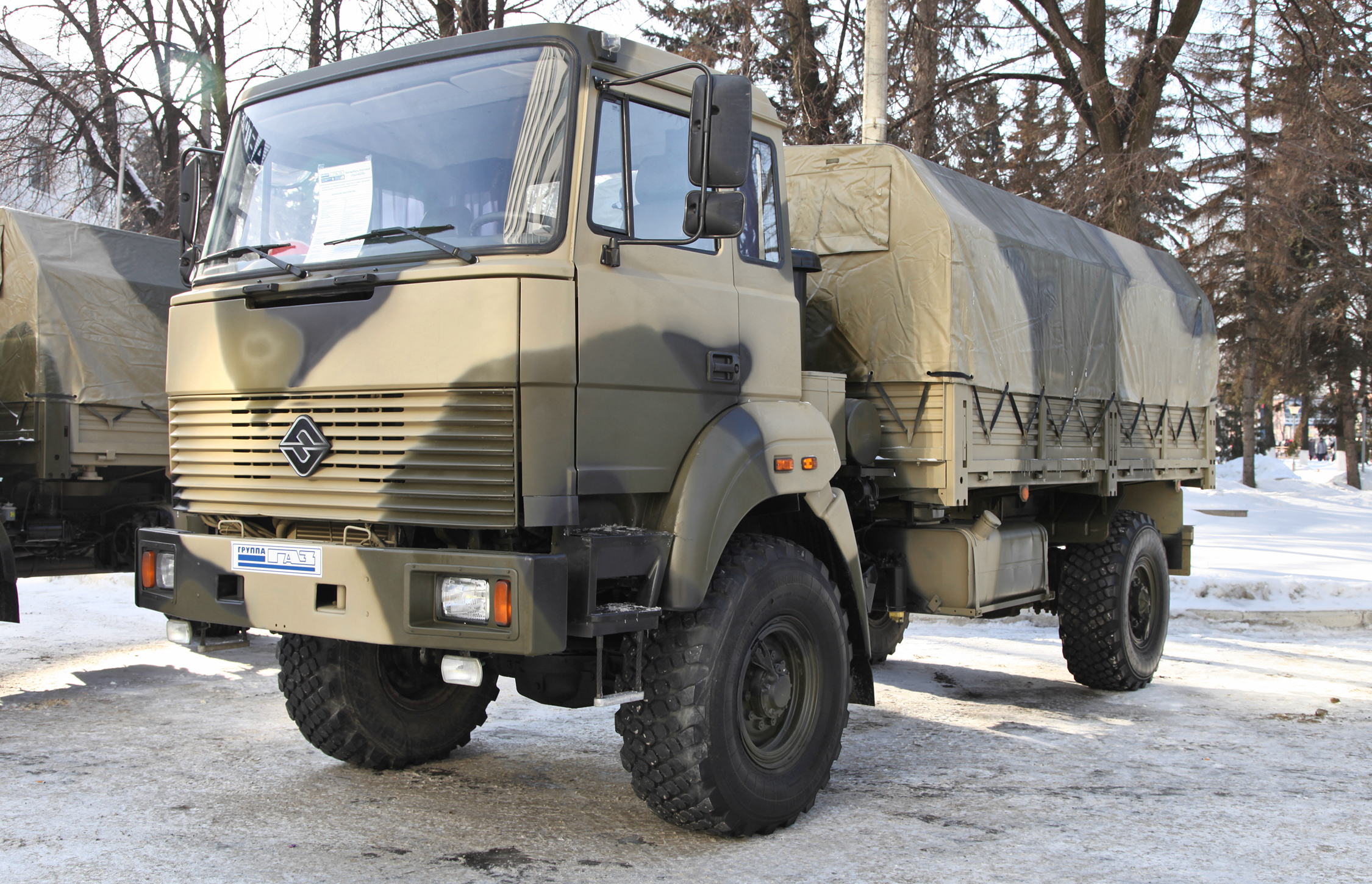
Ural-43206 with "new" Iveco cab (Iveco T-series)

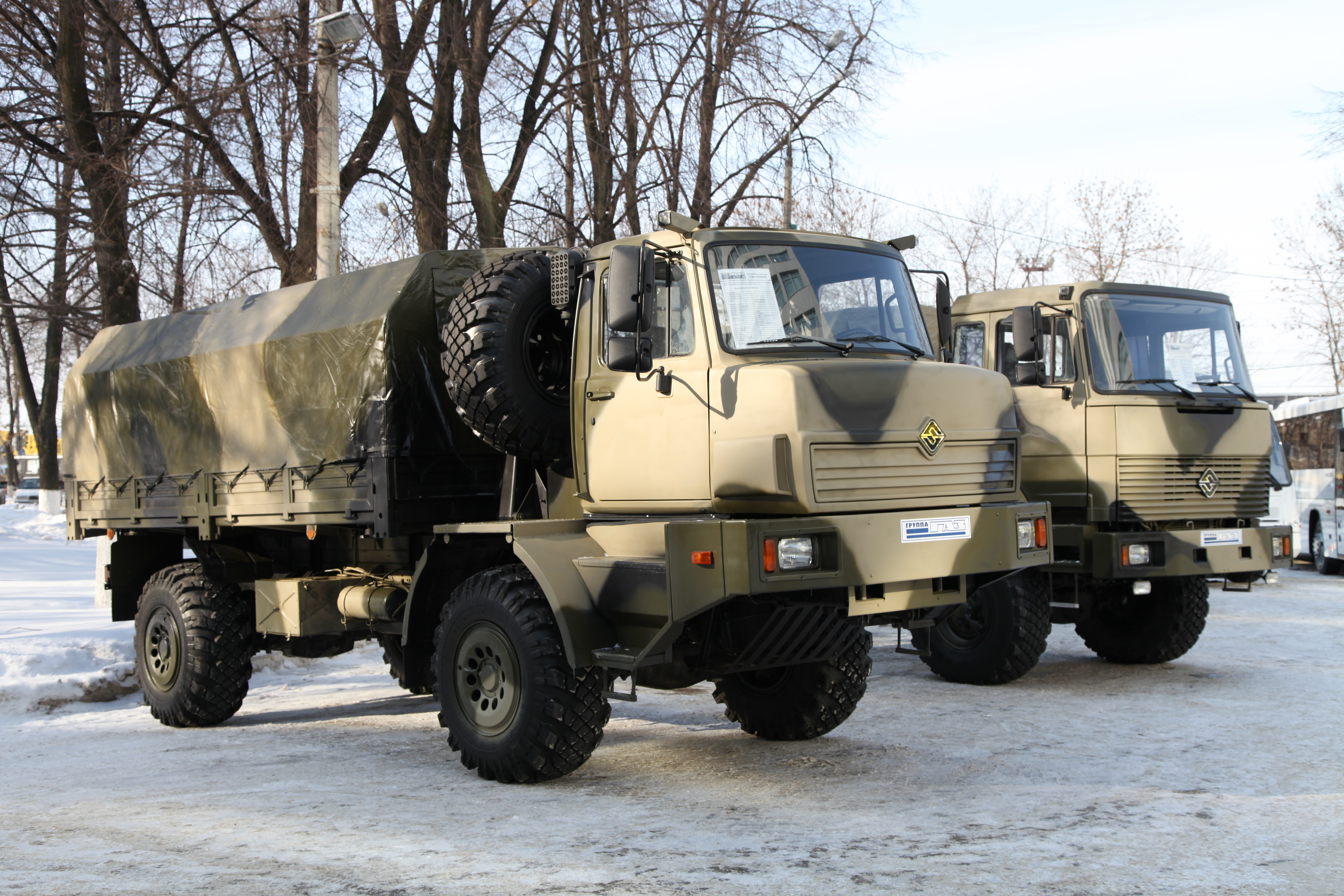
Ural-432065 and Ural-43206

- Ural-4320/5557 - 40/41 - All-metal, three seat, two-door cab, just under the symbol produced machines with dual four-door cab;
- Ural-4320/5557 - 44 - All-metal, three seat, two-door cabin with a sleeping bed;
- Ural-4320/5557 - 48/58/59 - new version with a more comfortable cabin with large volume bonnet and sprung driver's seat;

All versions are equipped with Iveco cabs.

== Operational history ==
=== Russian invasion of Ukraine ===
The vehicle was used during the Russian invasion of Ukraine; Oryxspioenkop analyzed photographic and video data and found Russia, as of 14 November 2024, had lost at least 1,454 Ural-4320s (including 183 tankers). While Ukraine having lost a total of 113.

== Users ==
- Armenia
- Azerbaijan: Ural-4320s used by Azerbaijani Armed Forces.
- Bangladesh
- Burkina Faso
- Cuba: Cuban Revolutionary Armed Forces.
- Egypt
- Laos: In service as of January 2019.
- Mali
- Philippines: Philippine Army 20 Units Donated by Russian Federation.
- Russia
- Syria
- Ukraine
- Uruguay

== Variants ==
=== Military ===
- Standard cargo/troop transport equipped with a cargo bed. It can be used to transport troops, weapons and other supplies. It has two collapsible benches and a canvas top to provide protection from the elements.
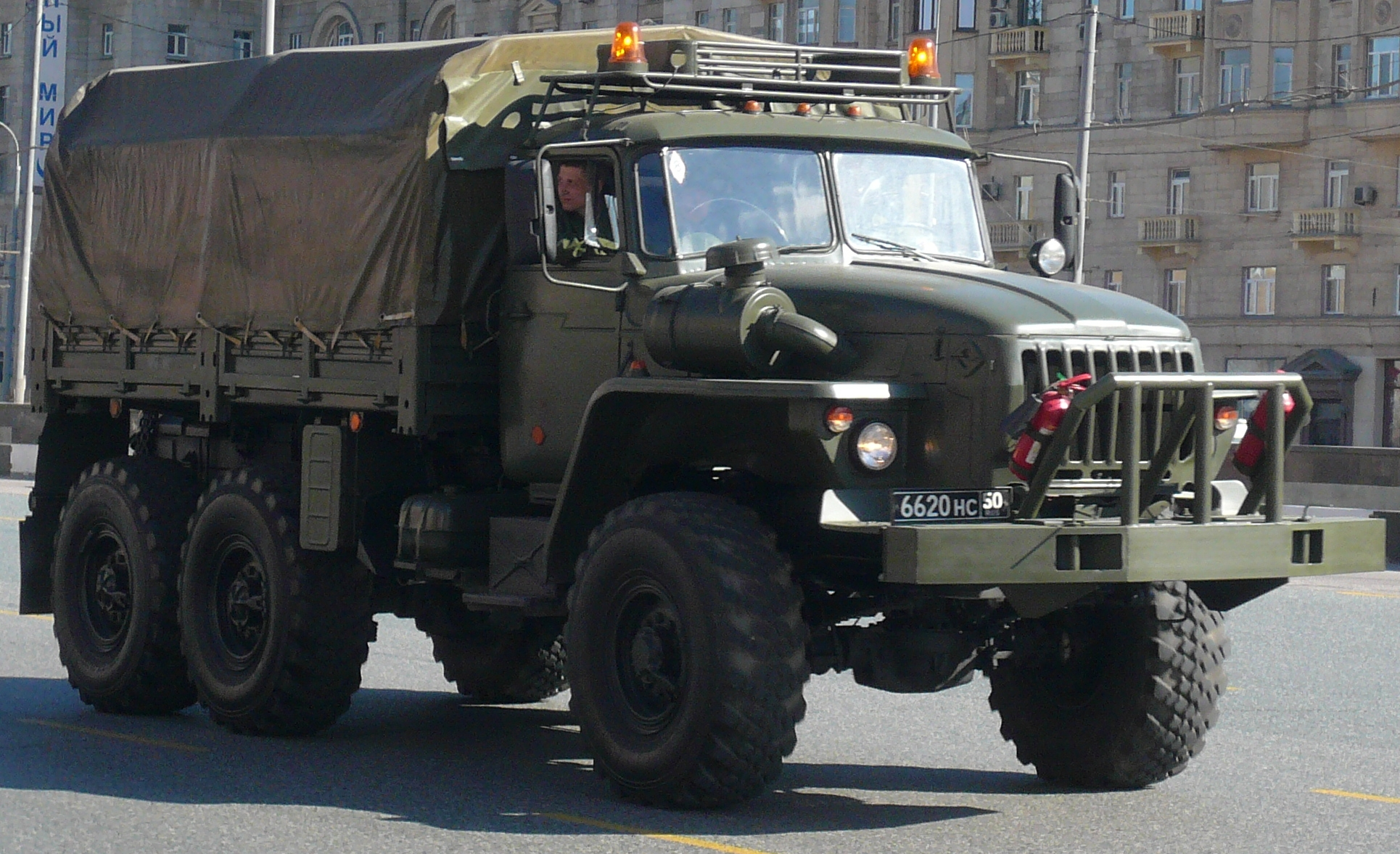
Short bed truck

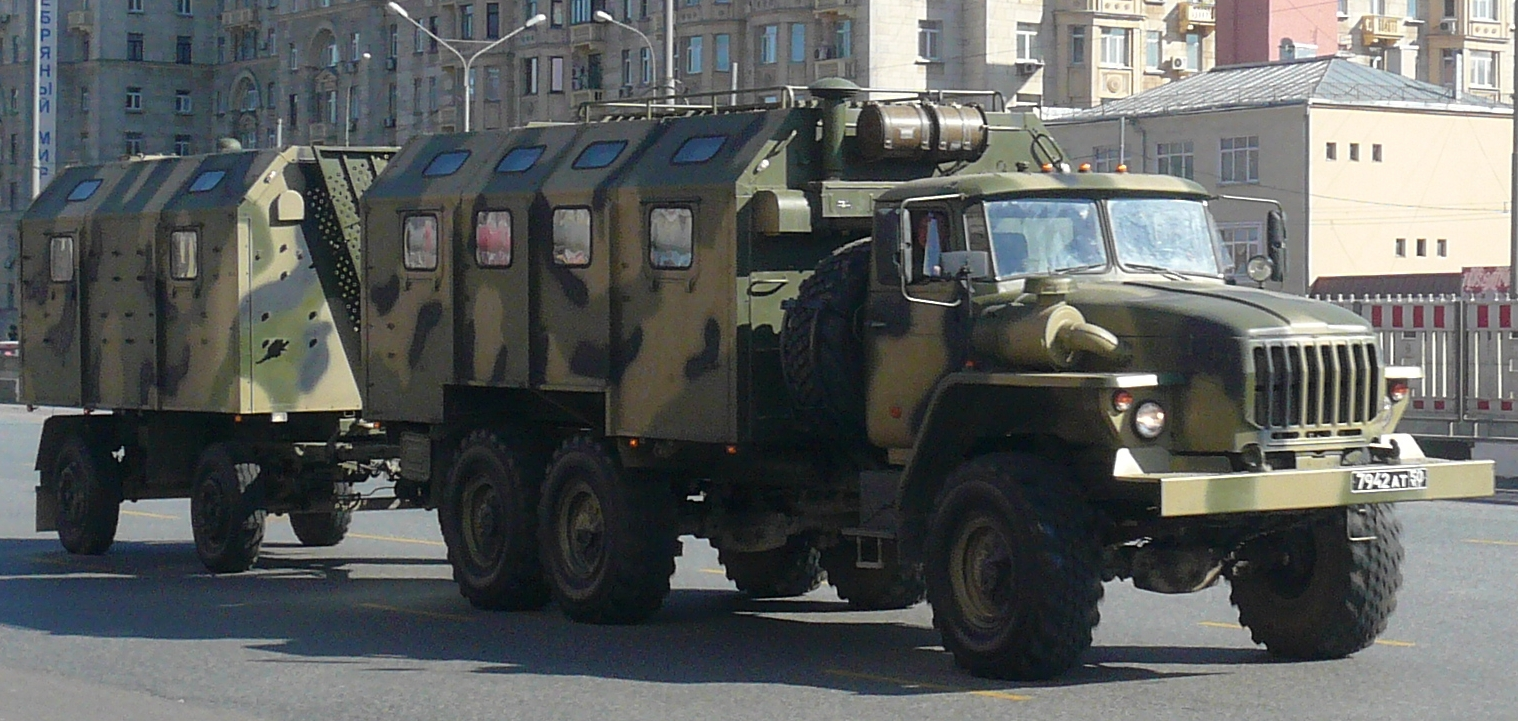
KUNG carrying truck with longer wheelbase and KUNG trailer

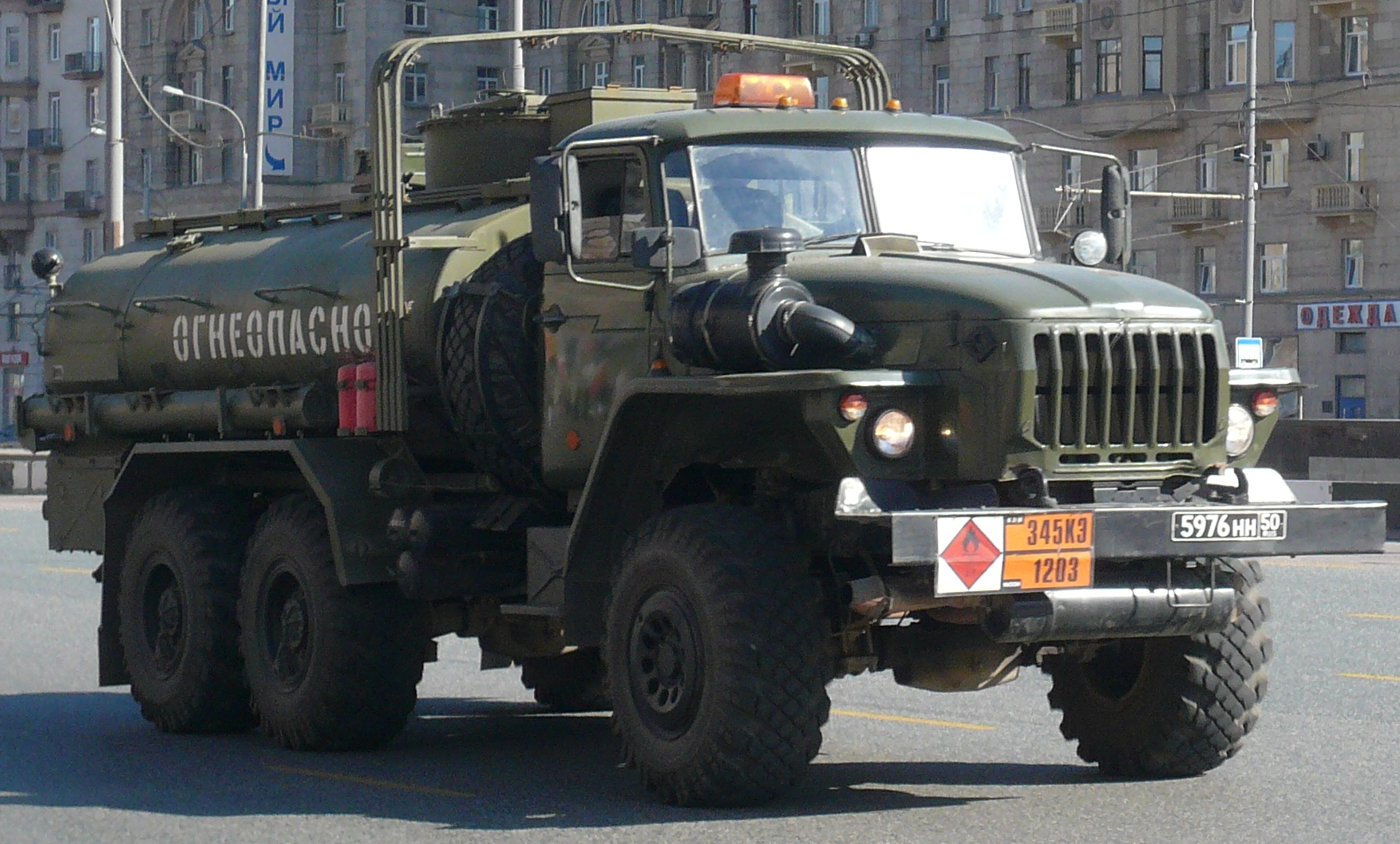
ATZ-5-4320, fuel tanker vehicle on Ural-4320 truck chassis

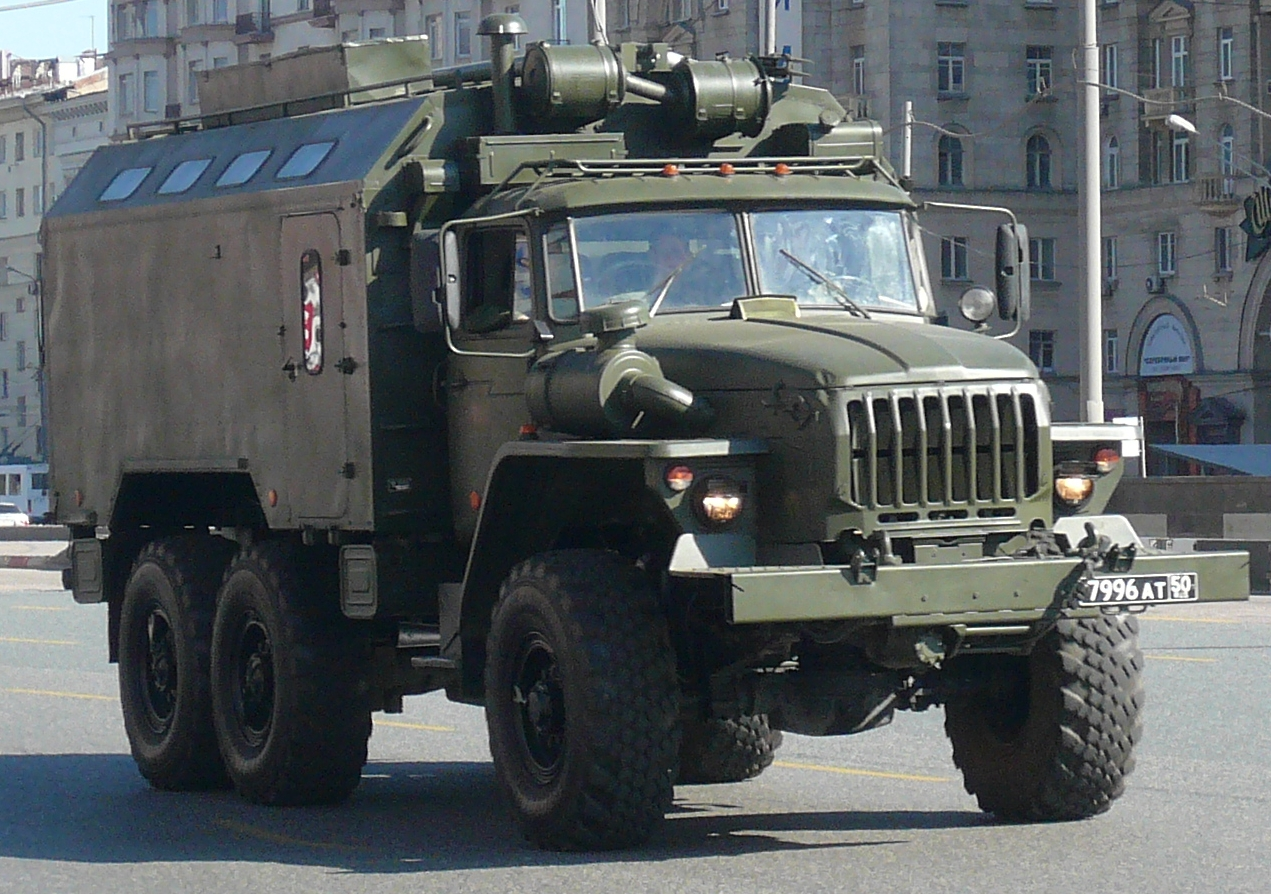
Armored with KUNG shelter
- Fully armored Ural-4320VV originally built for the Internal Troops
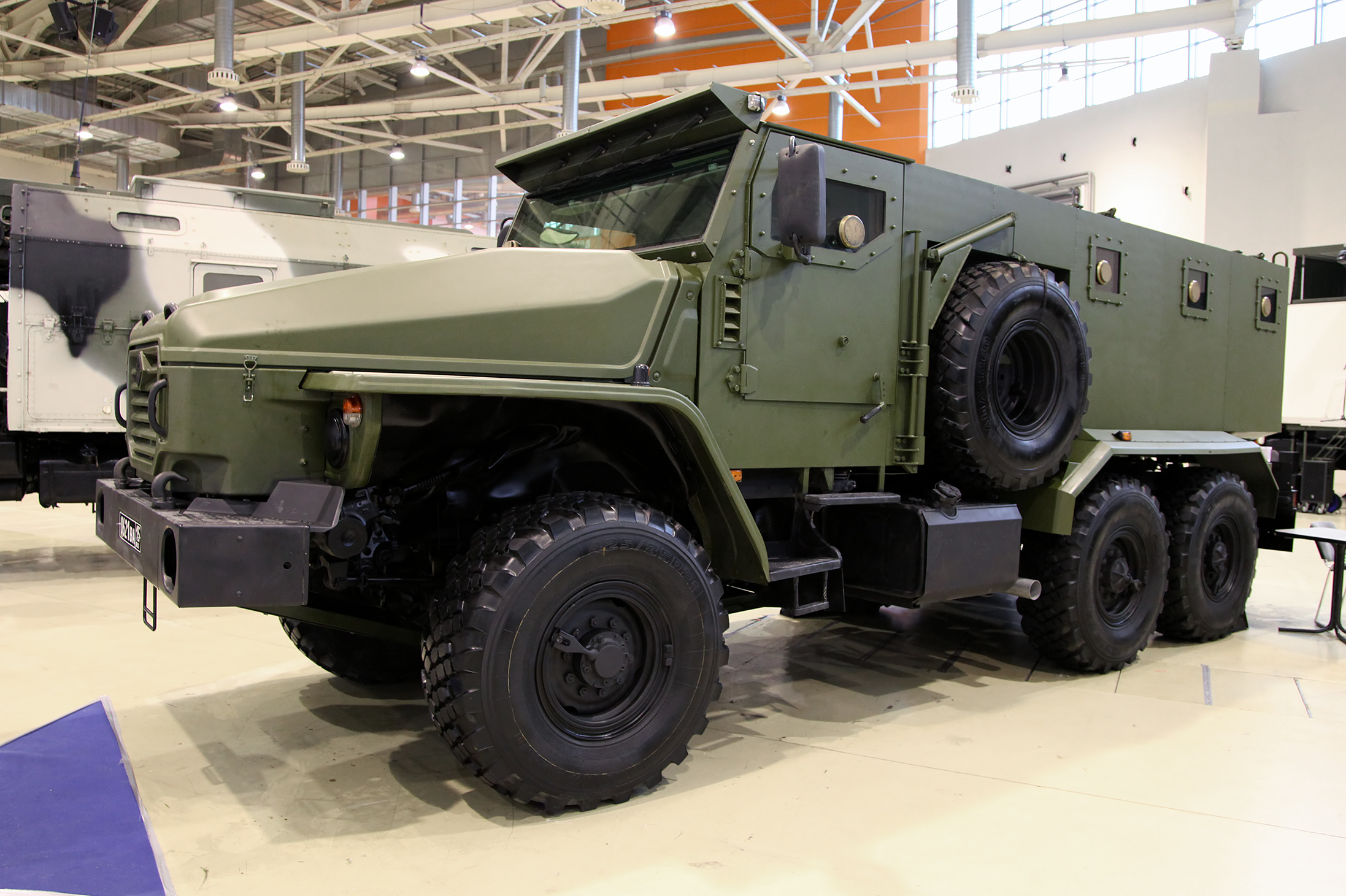
Ural-4320VV at Interpolitex 2013

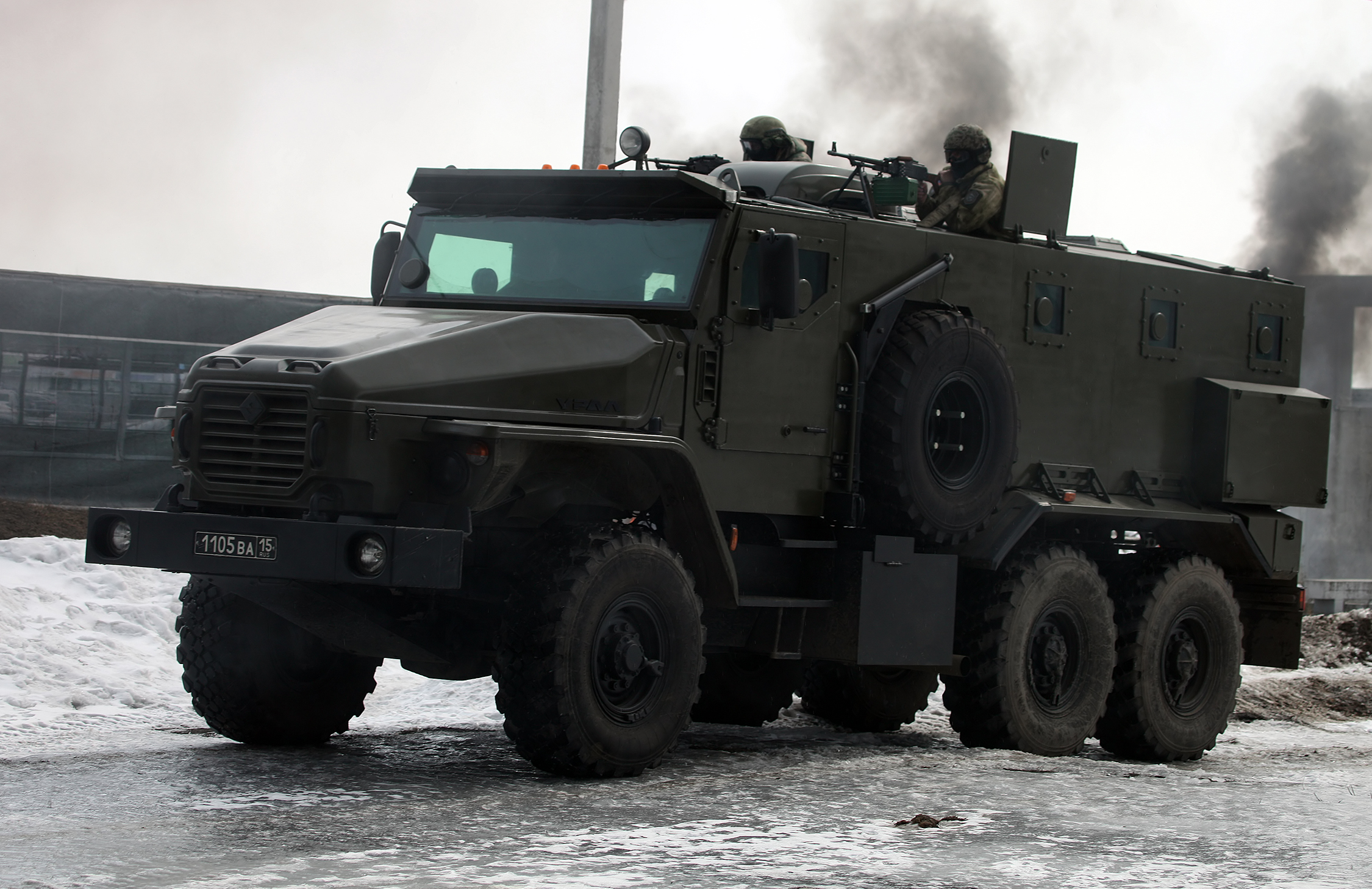
Internal Troops demonstrating the Ural-4320VV on Internal Troops Day of 2016

=== Civil ===
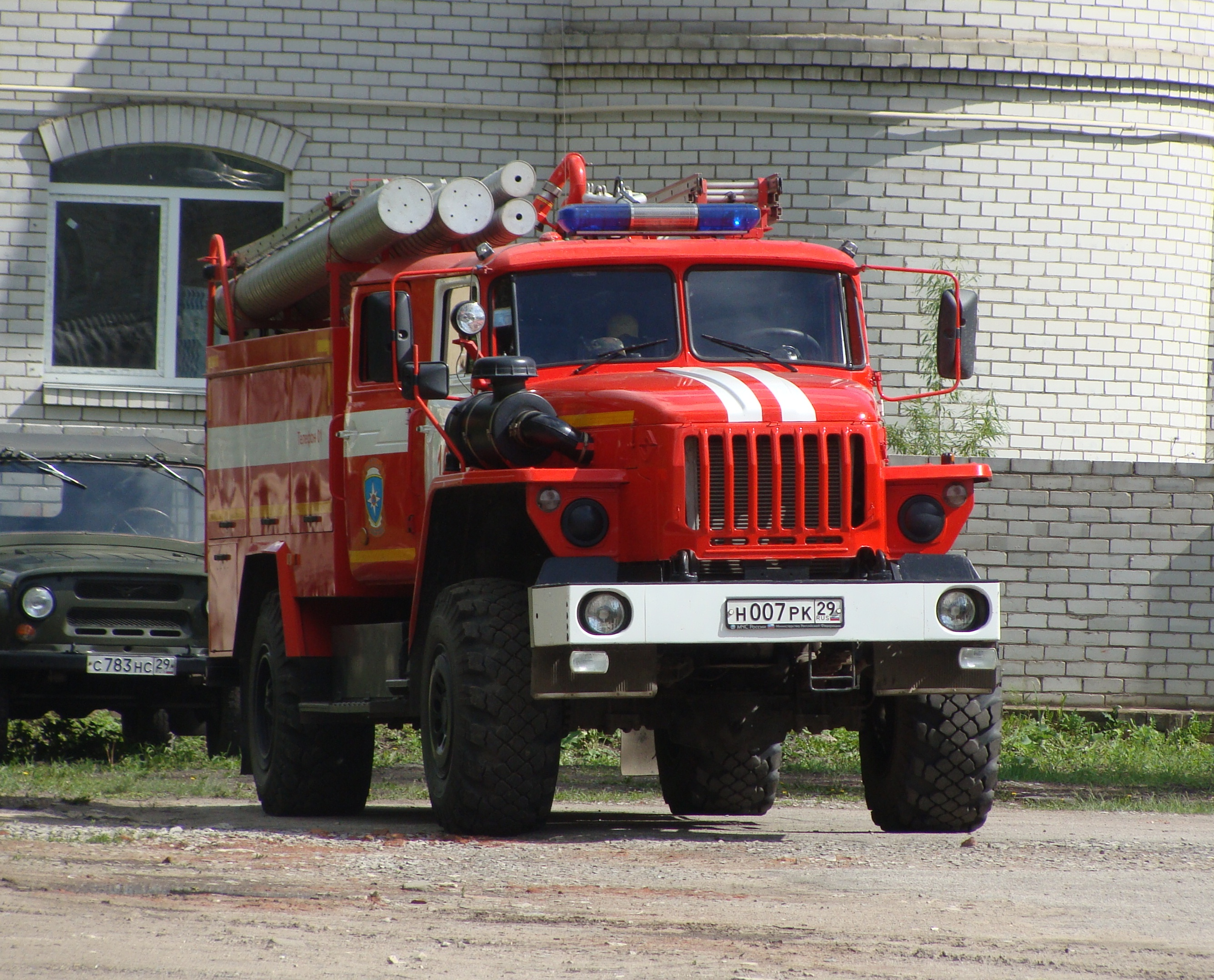
Fire appliance based on Ural-43206 4×4 chassis

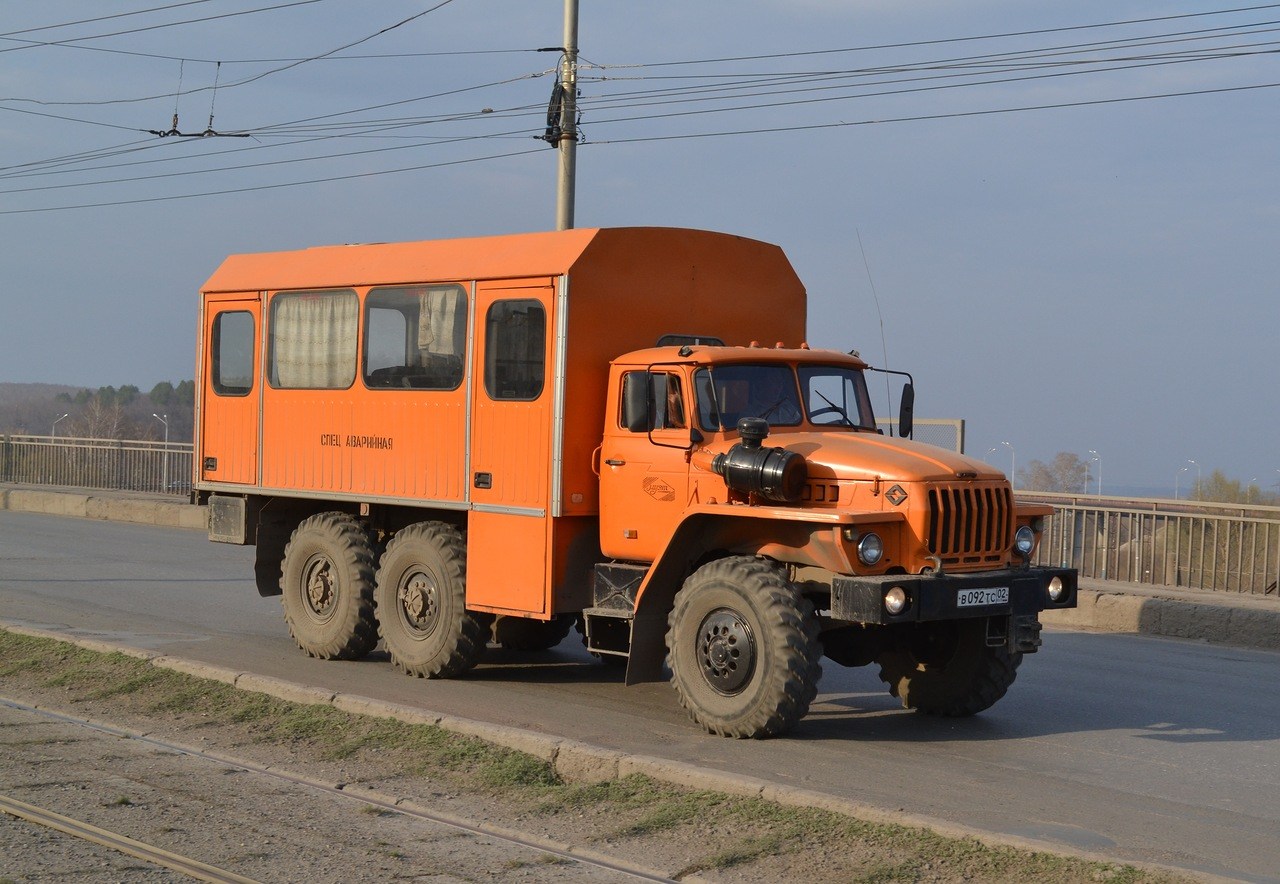
Ural-3255 truckbus based on Ural-4320

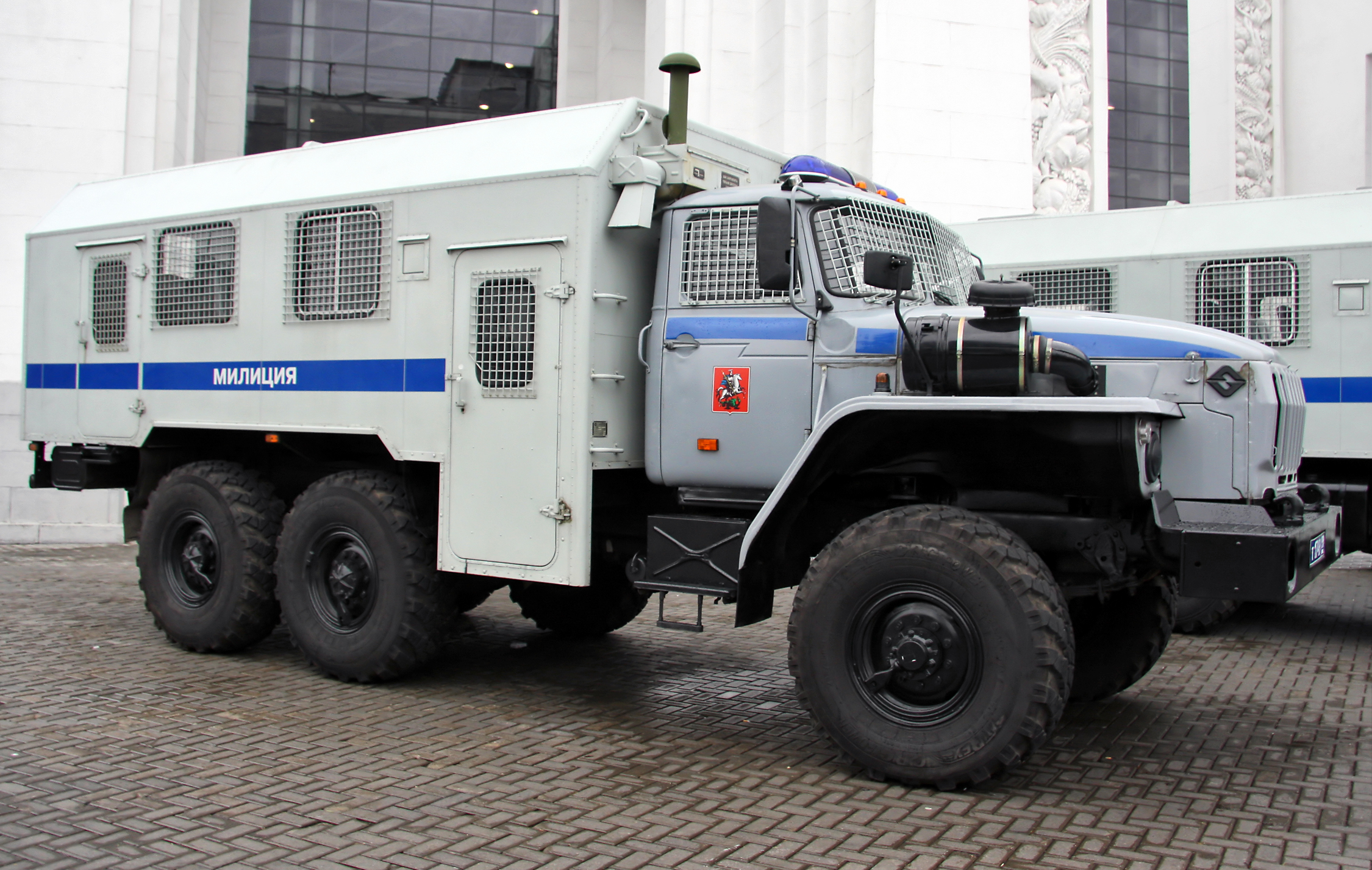
Moscow Police Ural-572060 also known as VM-4320

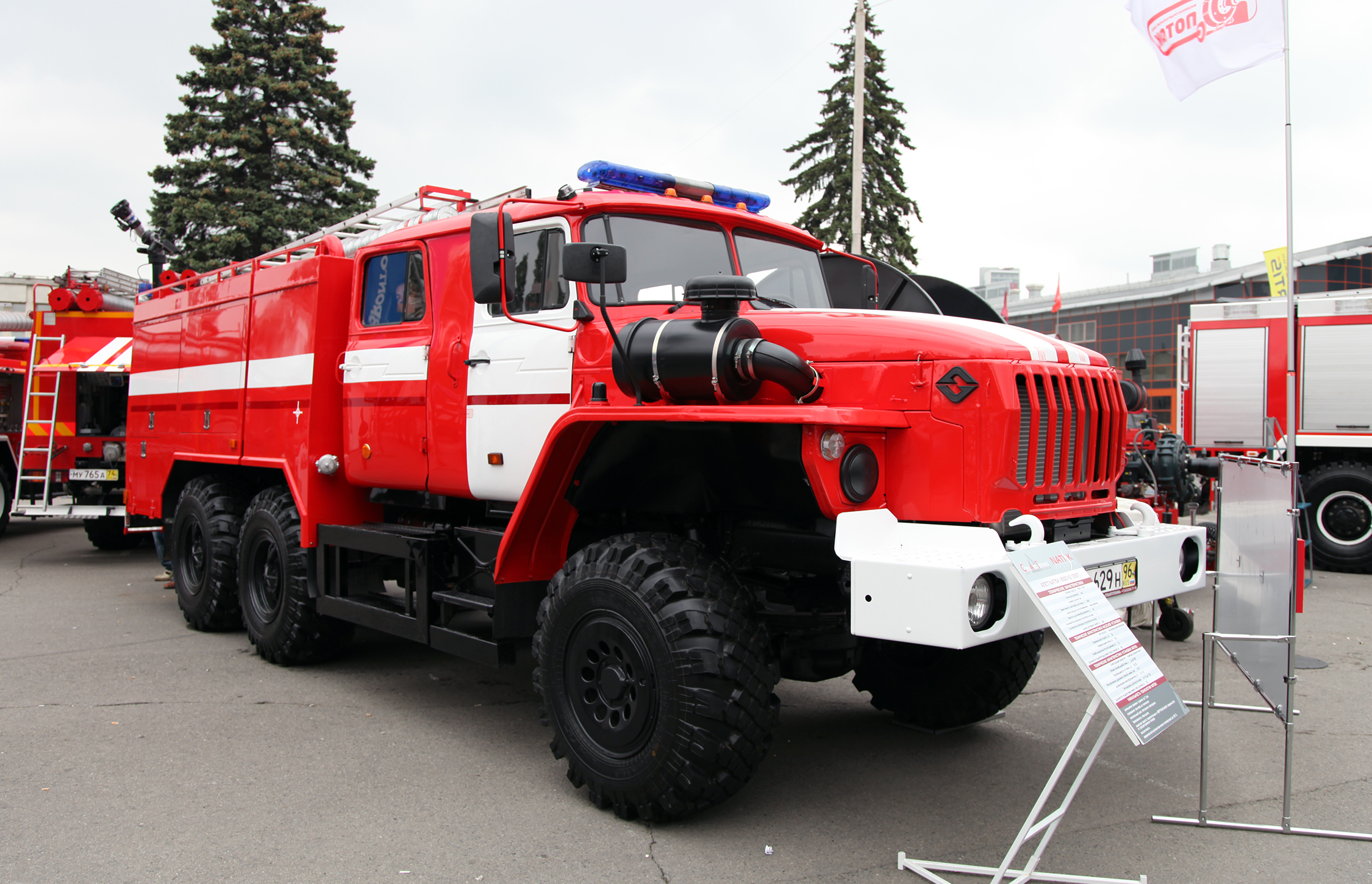
Firefighting vehicle NATISK-3000 KS on Ural-5557 chassis

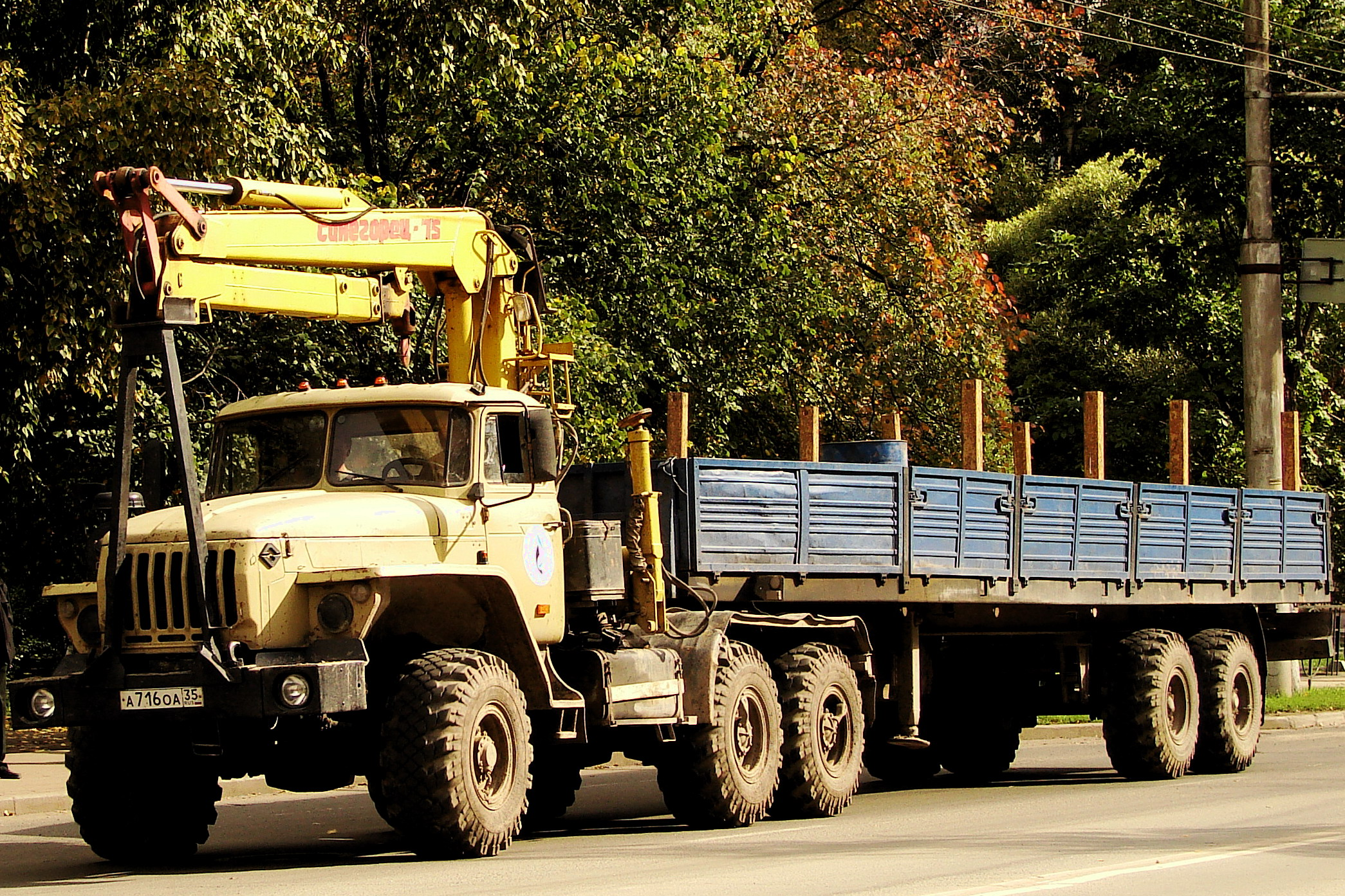
Ural-4420 with hydromanipulator and flatbed trailer

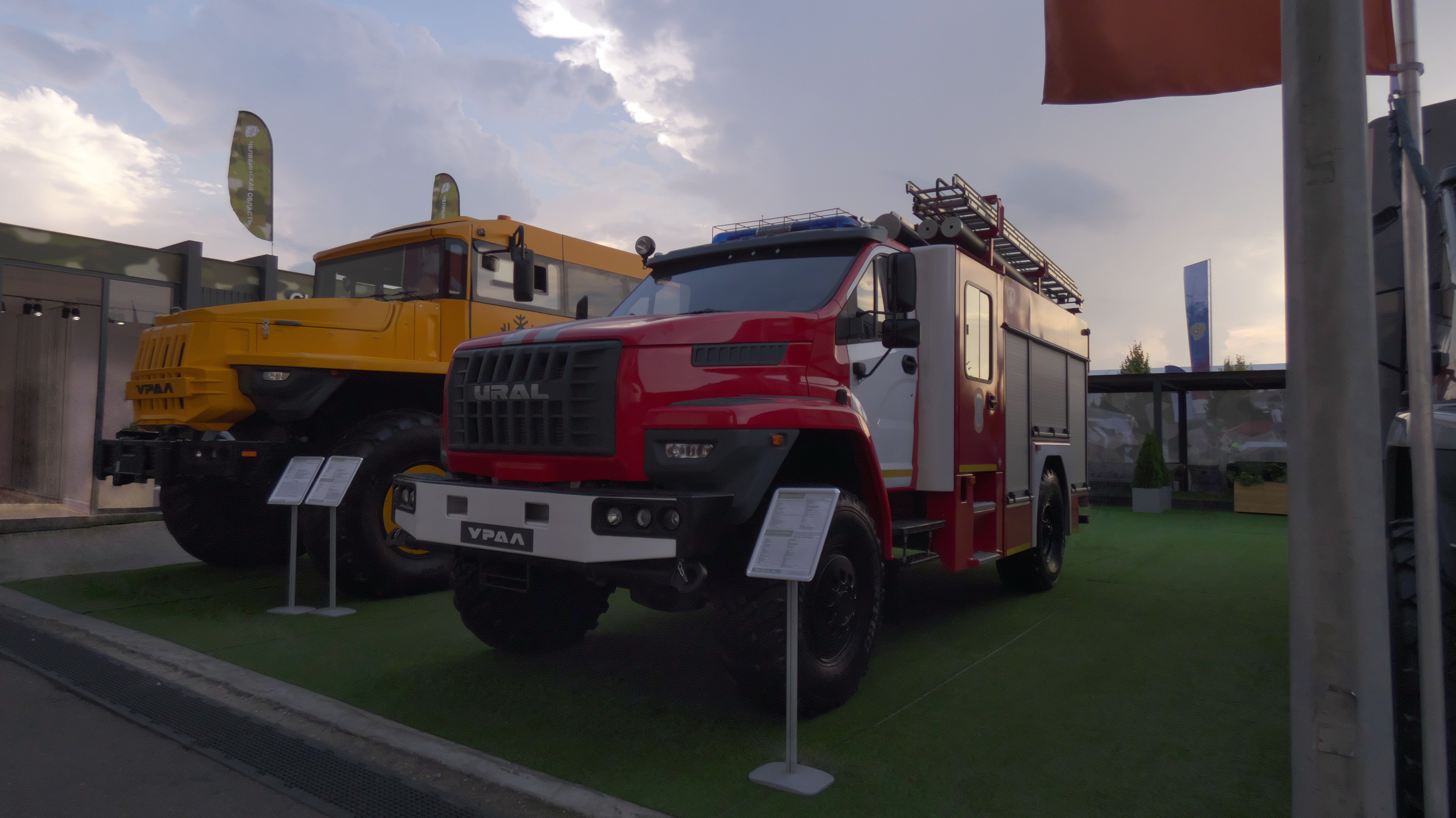
Arctic bus and Firetruck

== See also ==
- Ural-5323
- Family of Medium Tactical Vehicles
- Medium Tactical Vehicle Replacement
- M809 series trucks
- M54
- KrAZ-255
