= Camper shell =

Small housing

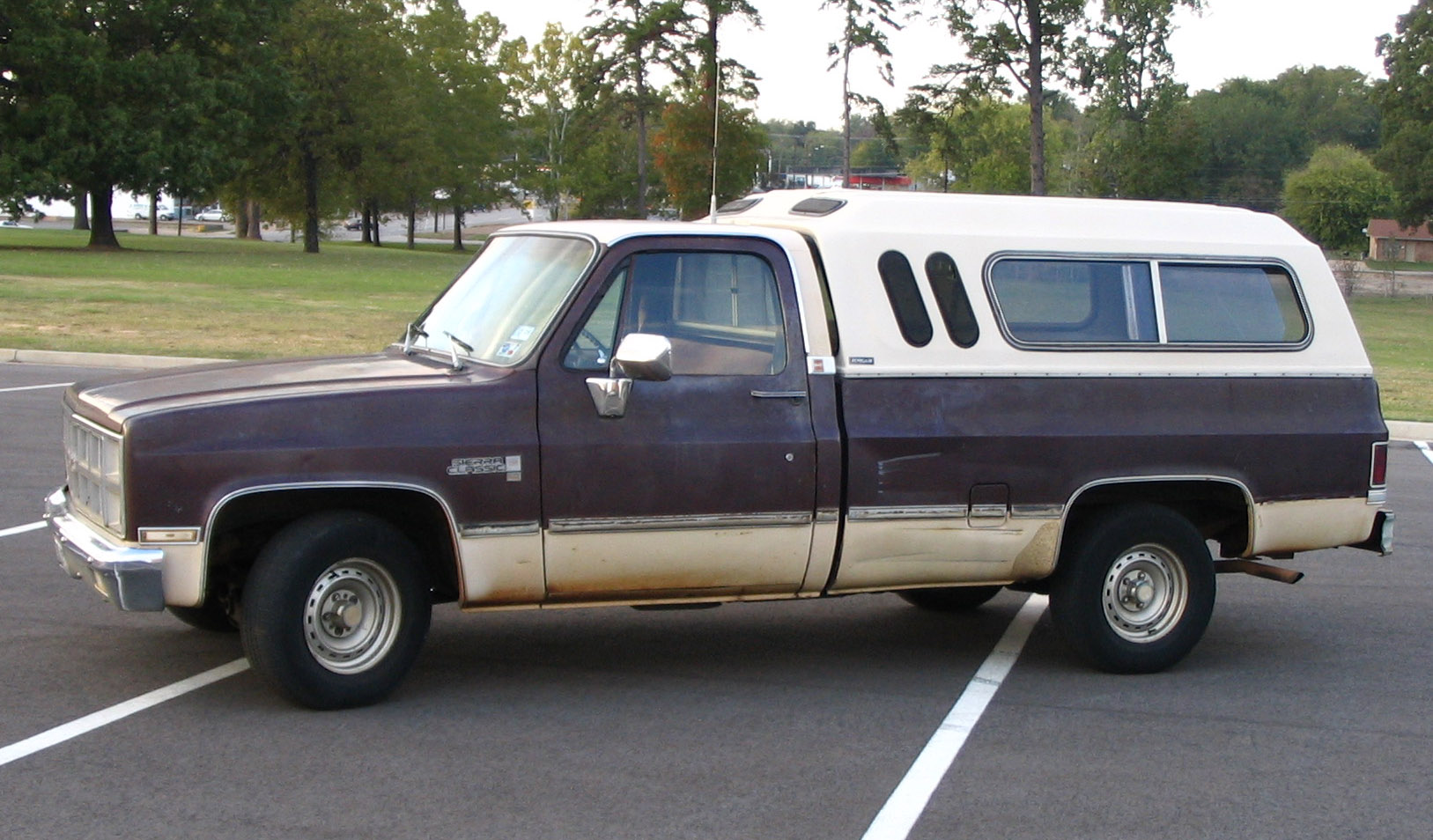
A truck with a traditional camper shell

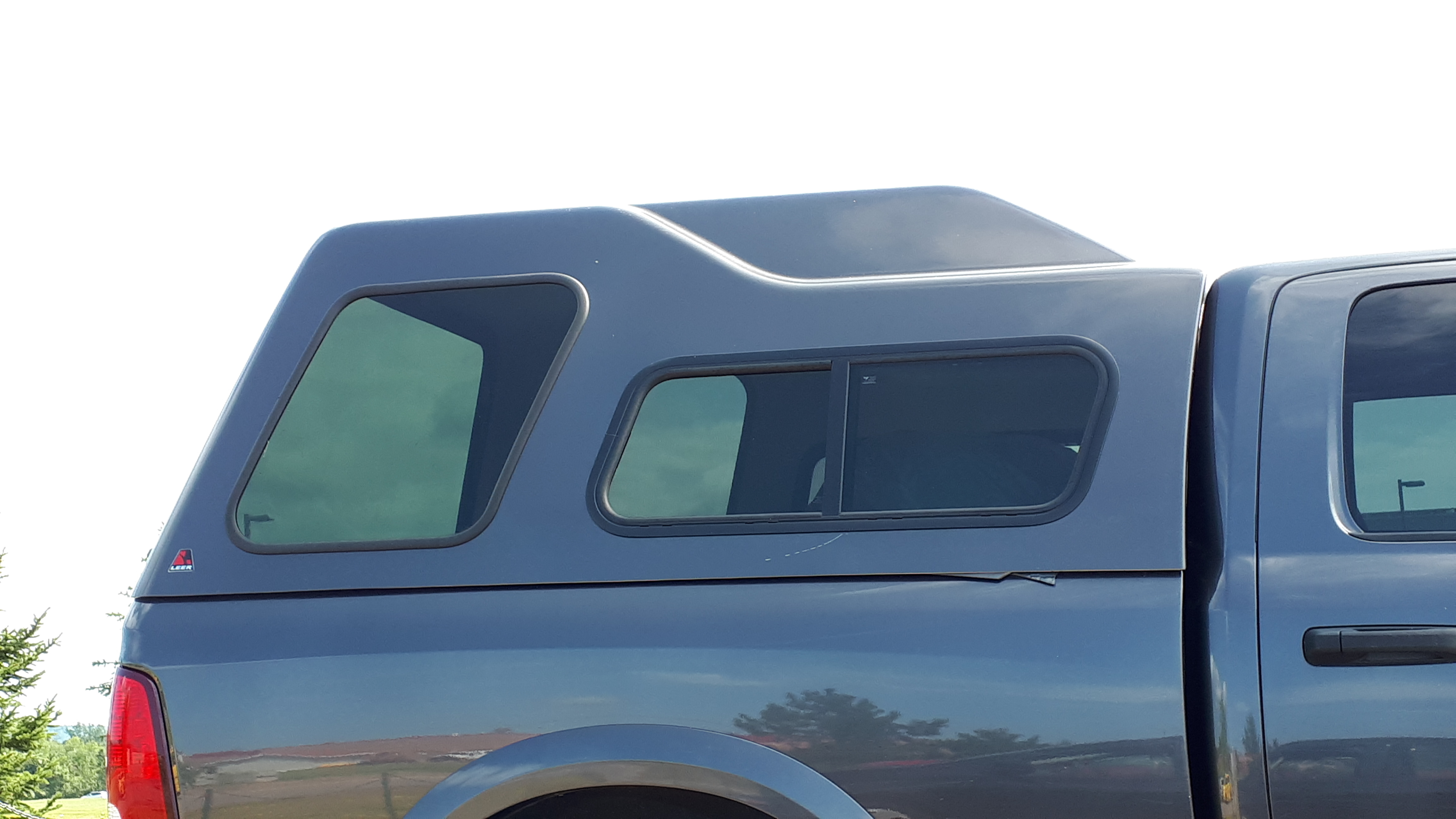
A modern LEER 122 camper shell

A camper shell (also bed cap, box cap, canopy, truck topper, pap cap, truck cap, or simply "shell") is a small housing or rigid canopy used as a pickup truck or coupe utility accessory. The housing is typically made of fiberglass or aluminum, or occasionally wood or canvas, and is mounted atop the pickup truck's rear bed. It usually covers the entire bed of the pickup truck, and is large enough to be used for camping purposes, thus making the vehicle an RV. The top of the camper shell is usually even with or above the top of the truck cab. Even though use for camping may have been its initial purpose, it now seems most often to be used for utility and storage purposes – particularly the protection of cargo from the elements and theft.

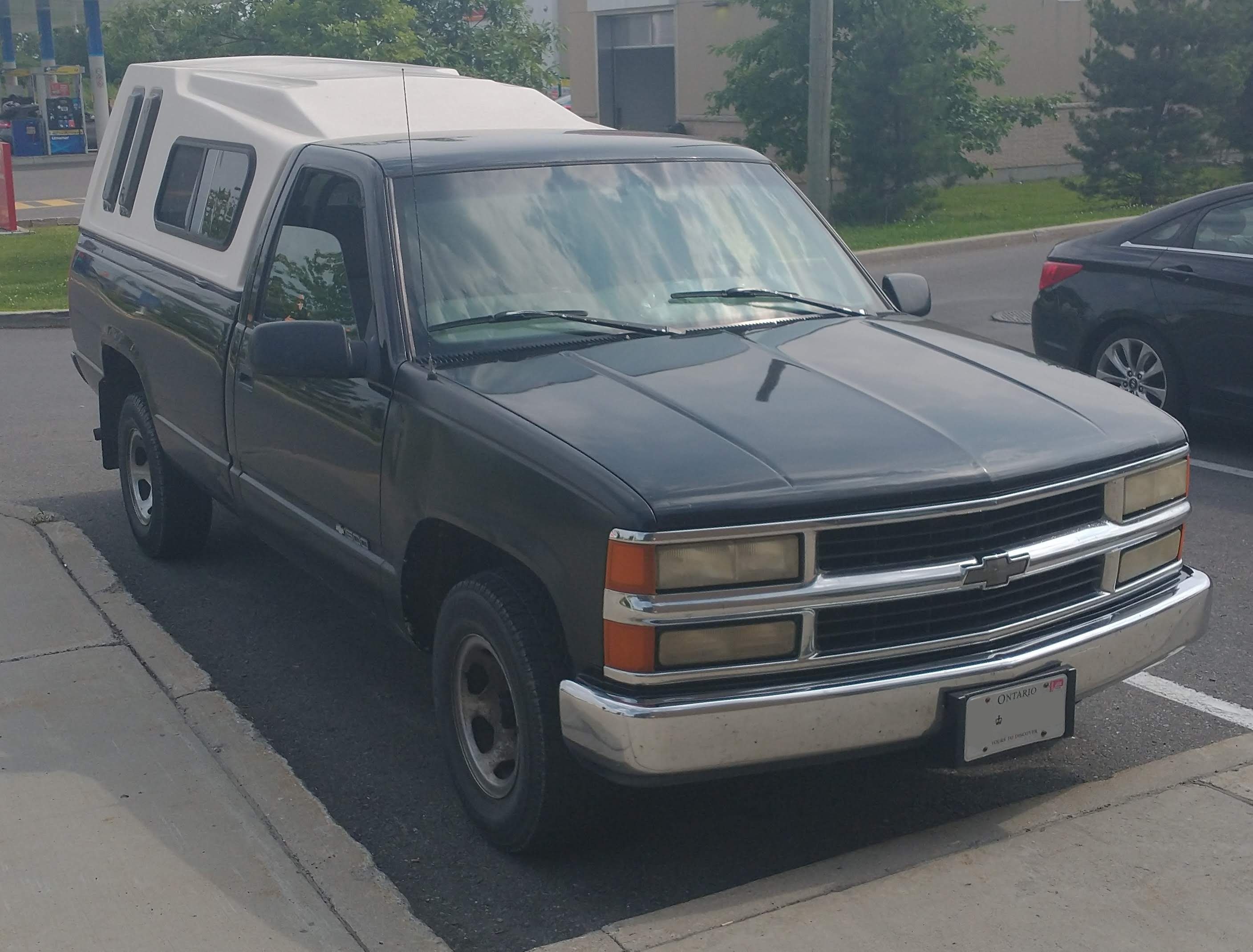
A Chevrolet C1500 with a white camper shell.

A tonneau cover is a soft or hard covering over the entire truck bed that is level or slightly raised above the edge of the truck bed.

== See also ==
- Campervan
- KUNG
- Teardrop trailer
- Toppola
- Travel trailer
- Truck camper
