= List of ZiL vehicles =

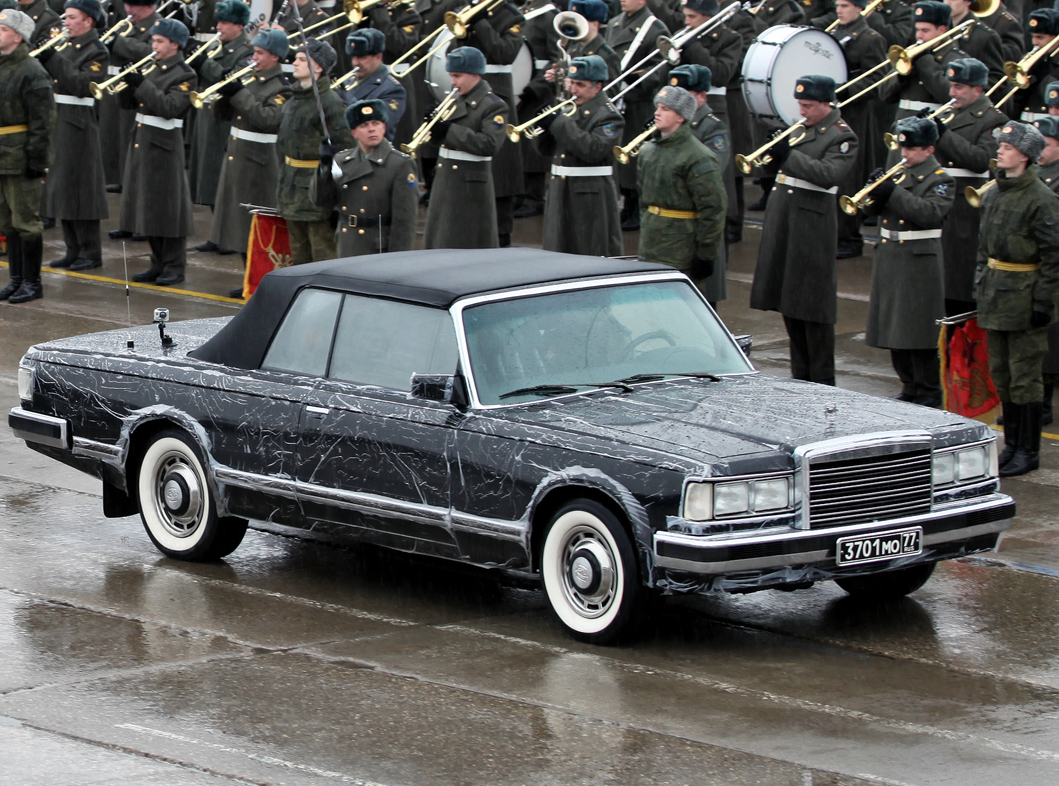
A ZIL-41044

This is a list of vehicles designed called ZiL, a Russian maker of passenger cars, trucks, and military vehicles.

== Production ==
ZiL produced armored cars for most Soviet leaders, as well as buses, armoured fighting vehicles, and aerosani. The company also produced hand-built limousines and high-end luxury sedans (автомобиль представительского класса, literally "representative class vehicle", but also translated as "luxury vehicle") in extremely low quantities, primarily for the former Soviet and current Russian government officials. ZiL passenger cars were priced at the equivalent of models by Maybach and Rolls-Royce, but are largely unknown outside the Commonwealth of Independent States, and production rarely exceeded a dozen cars per year.

=== Executive cars and limousines ===
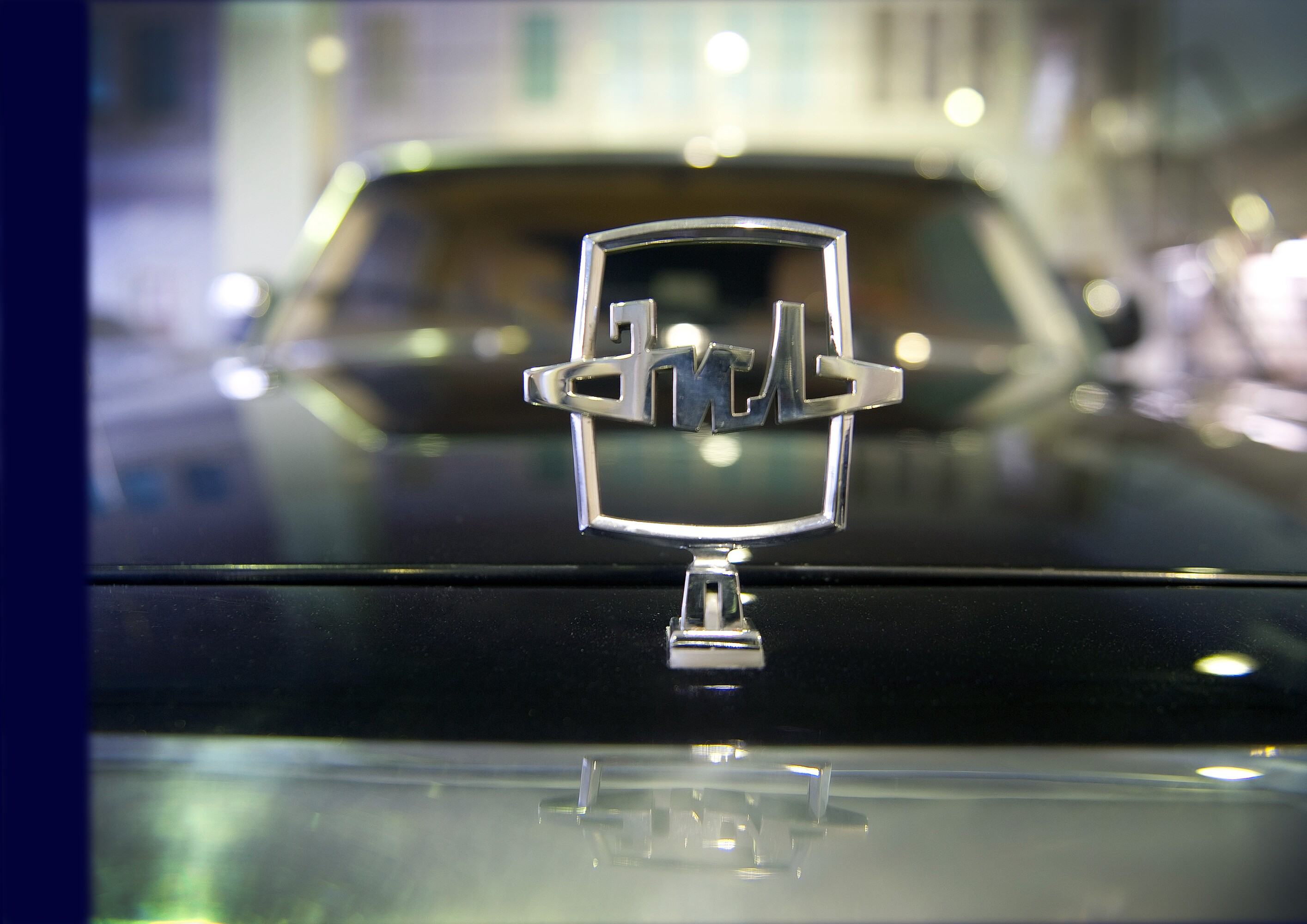
ZiL logo

- ZIS-101 (1936-1939)
  - ZIS-101A (1939-1941)
- ZIS-102 (1937-1939, convertible version of ZIS-101)
- ZIS-110 (1945-1957)
- ZIS-115 (1949-1955, armoured version of ZIS-110)
- ZIL-MZ (prototype sub-compact convertible, 1962)
- ZIL-111 (1959-1962)
  - ZIL-111G (1962-1967)
- ZIL-114 (1967-1978)
- ZIL-115 (1972)
- ZIL-117 (1971-1978, shortened ZIL-114)
- ZIL-4102 (prototype, 1988)
- ZIL-4104 (1978-1983)
- ZIL-4105 (1988-1989, armoured version of ZIL-41047)
- ZIL-41041 (1985, five-seat version of ZIL-41047)
- ZIL-41042 (station wagon version of ZIL-4104)
- ZIL-41044 (1981, convertible version of ZIL-4104)
- ZIL-41045 (1983-1985, upgraded ZIL-4104)
- ZIL-41046 (1983-1985, communication car based on ZIL-4104)
- ZIL-41047 (1985-2002, 2010)
- ZIL-41072 (1989, escort version of ZIL-41047)
- ZIL-4112R (2012)
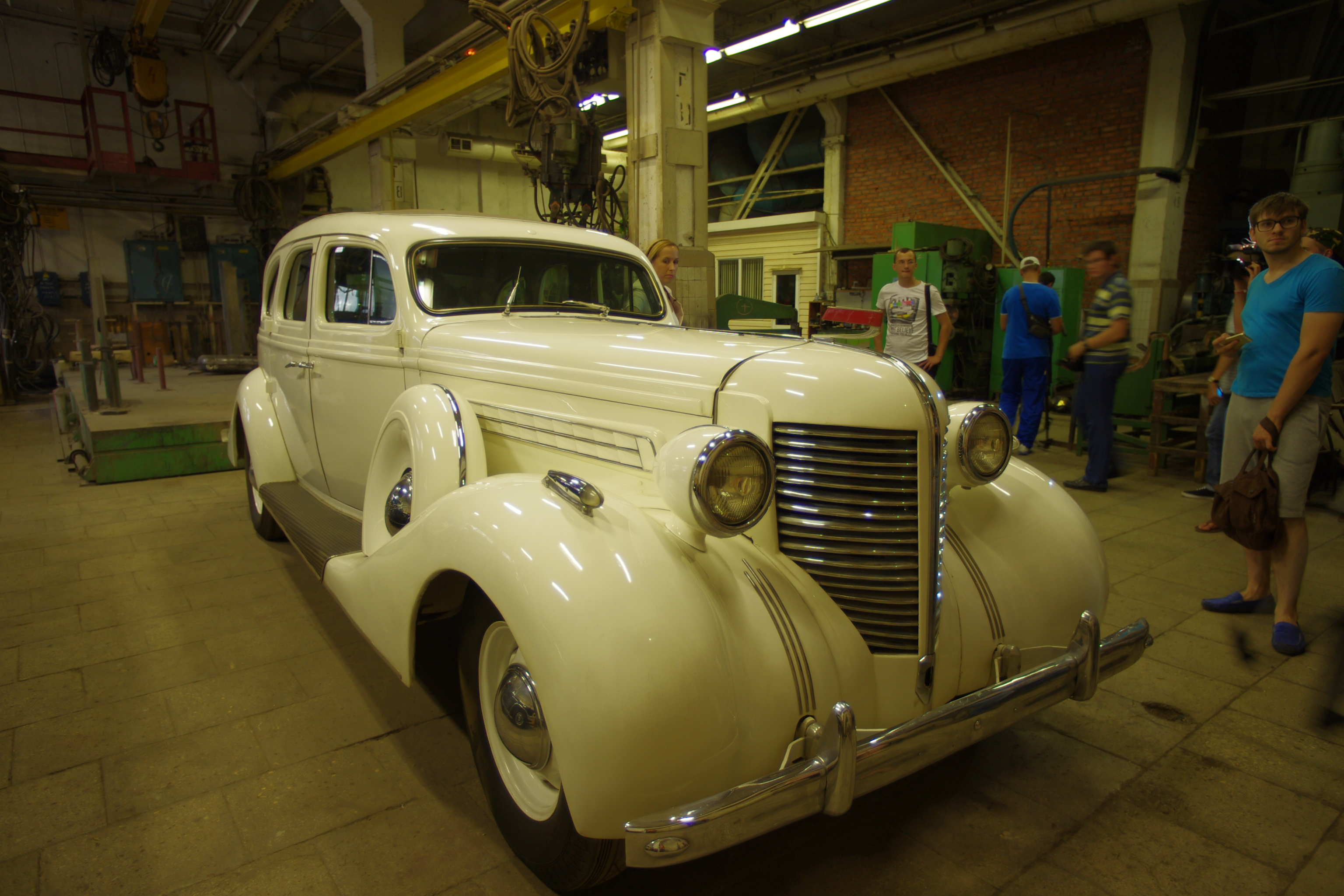
ZIS-101

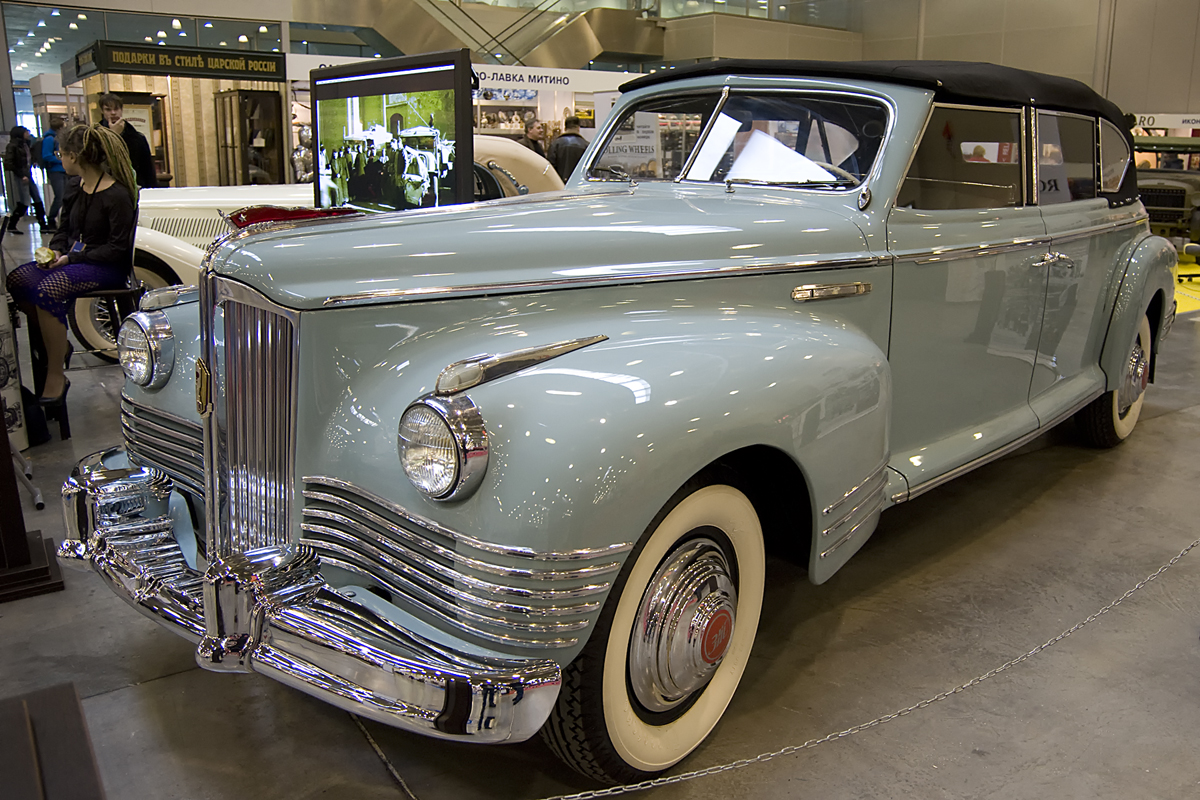
ZIS-110

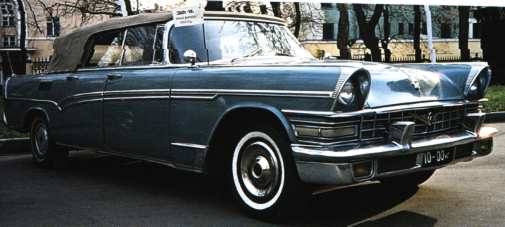
ZIL-111V convertible

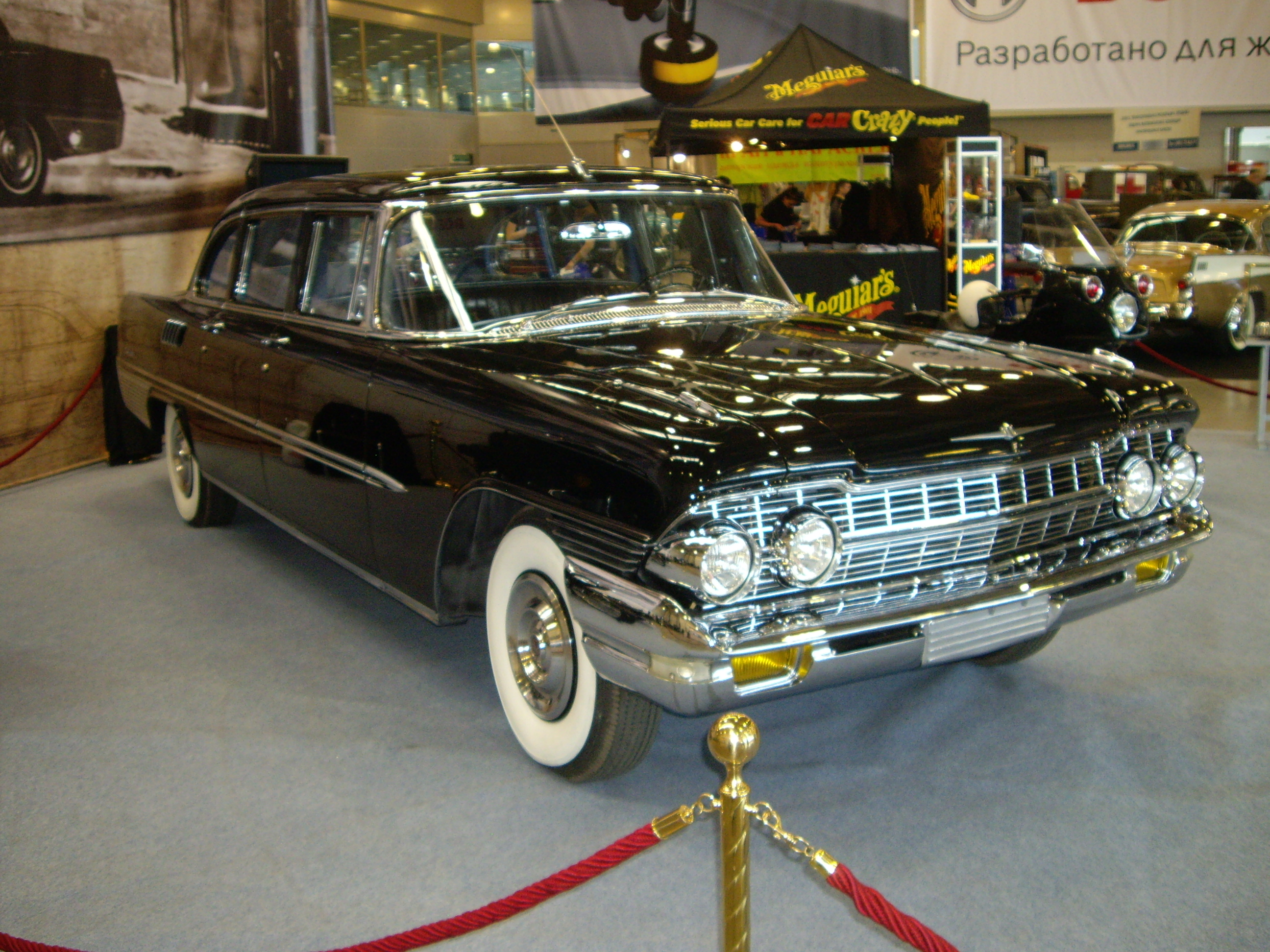
ZIL-111G

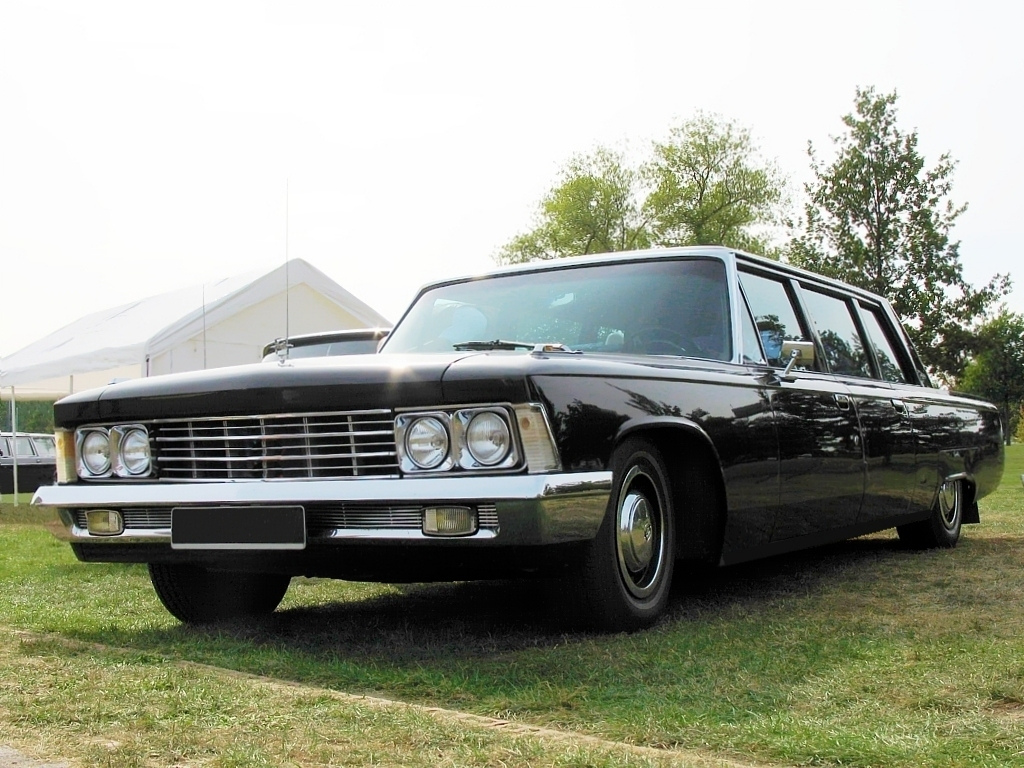
ZIL-114

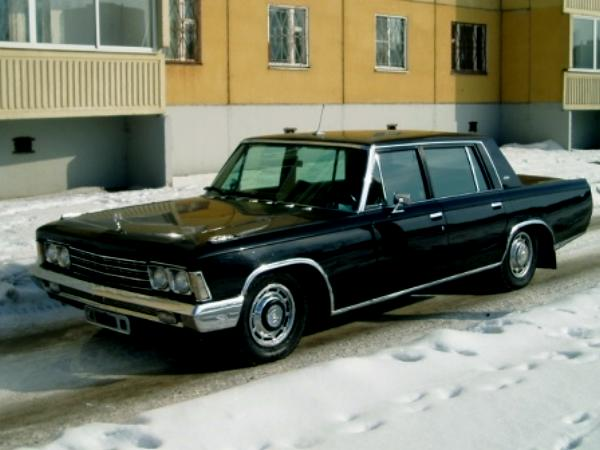
ZIL-117

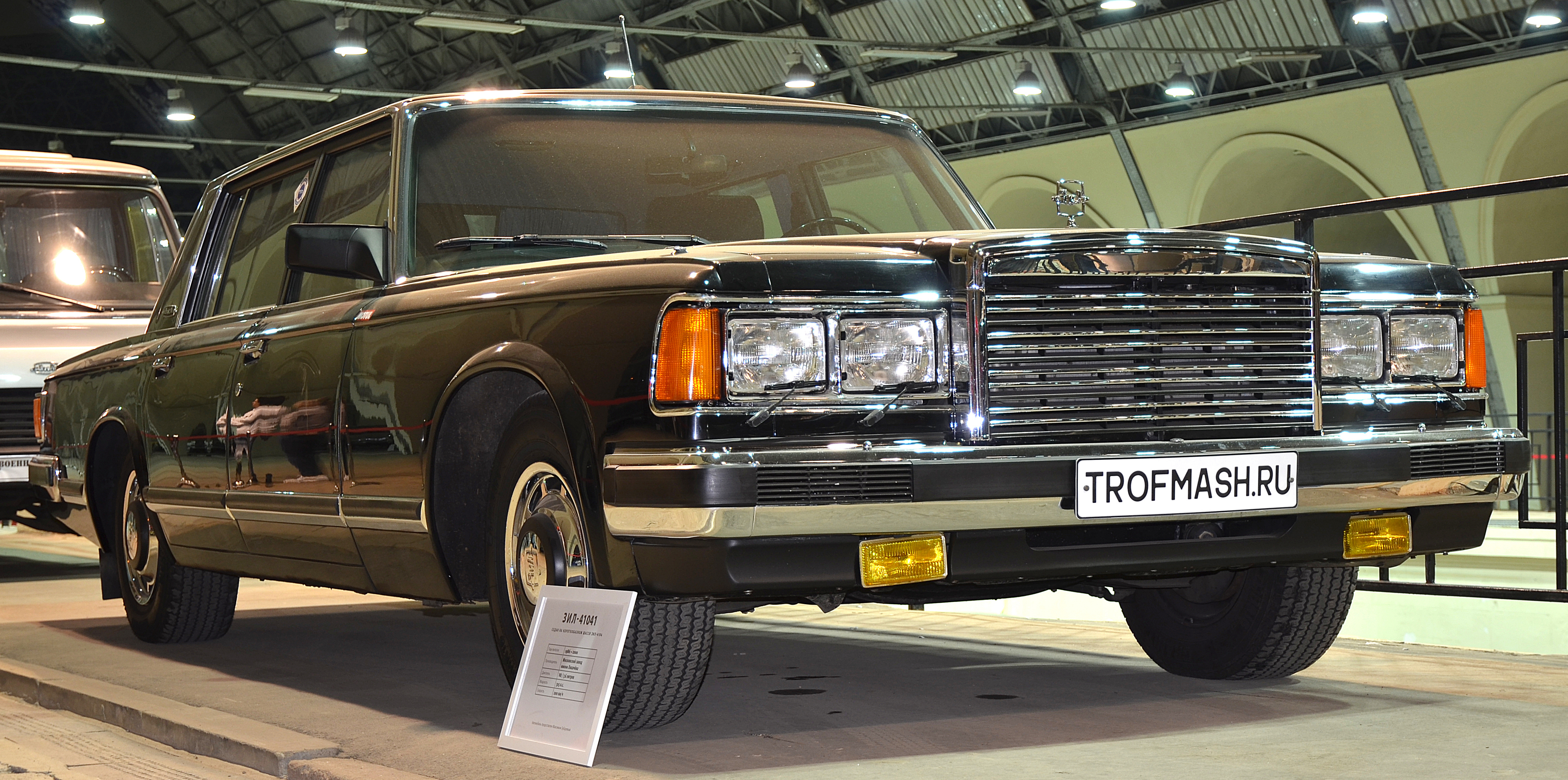
ZIL-41041

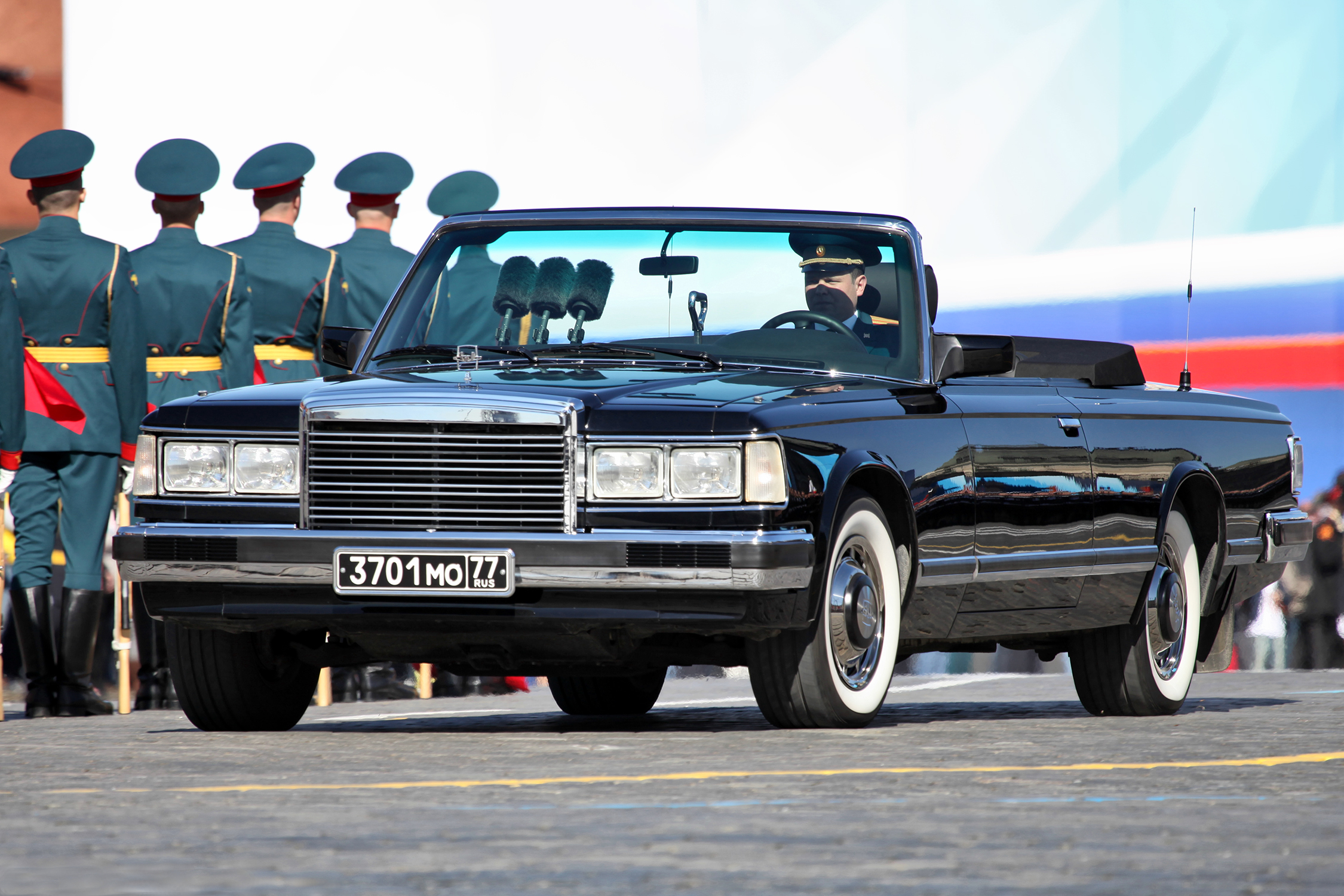
ZIL-41044

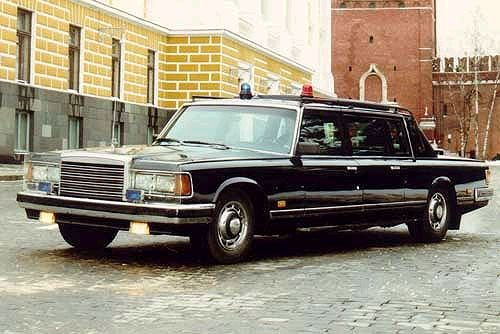
ZIL-41047

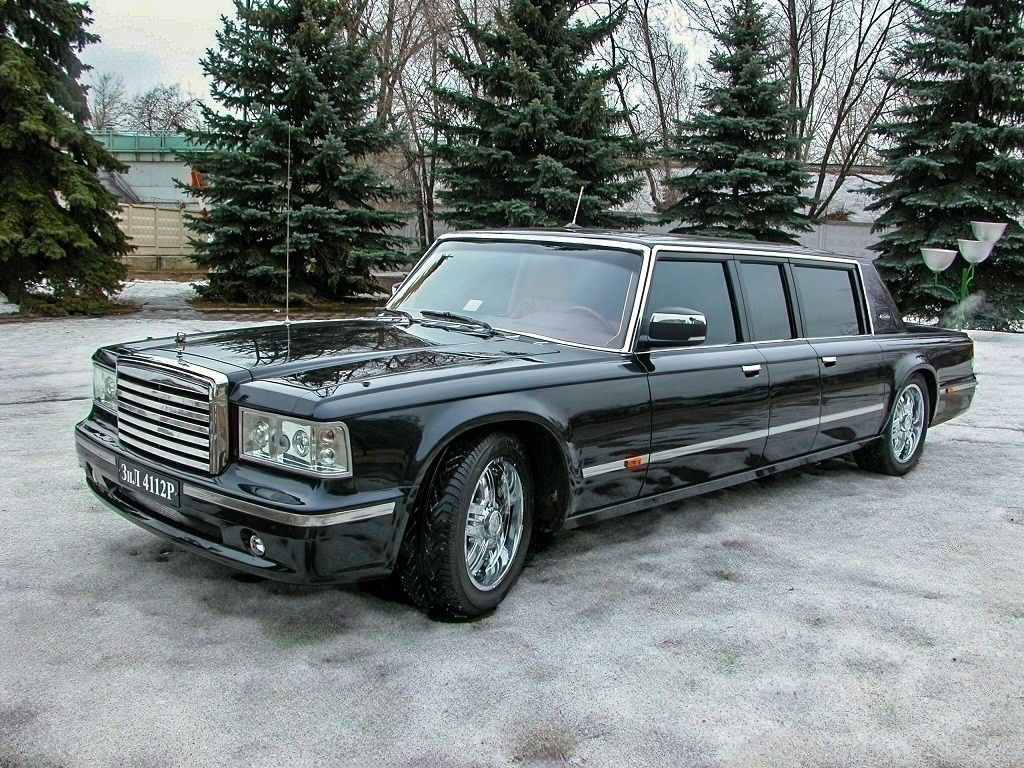
ZIL-4112R

=== Trucks ===
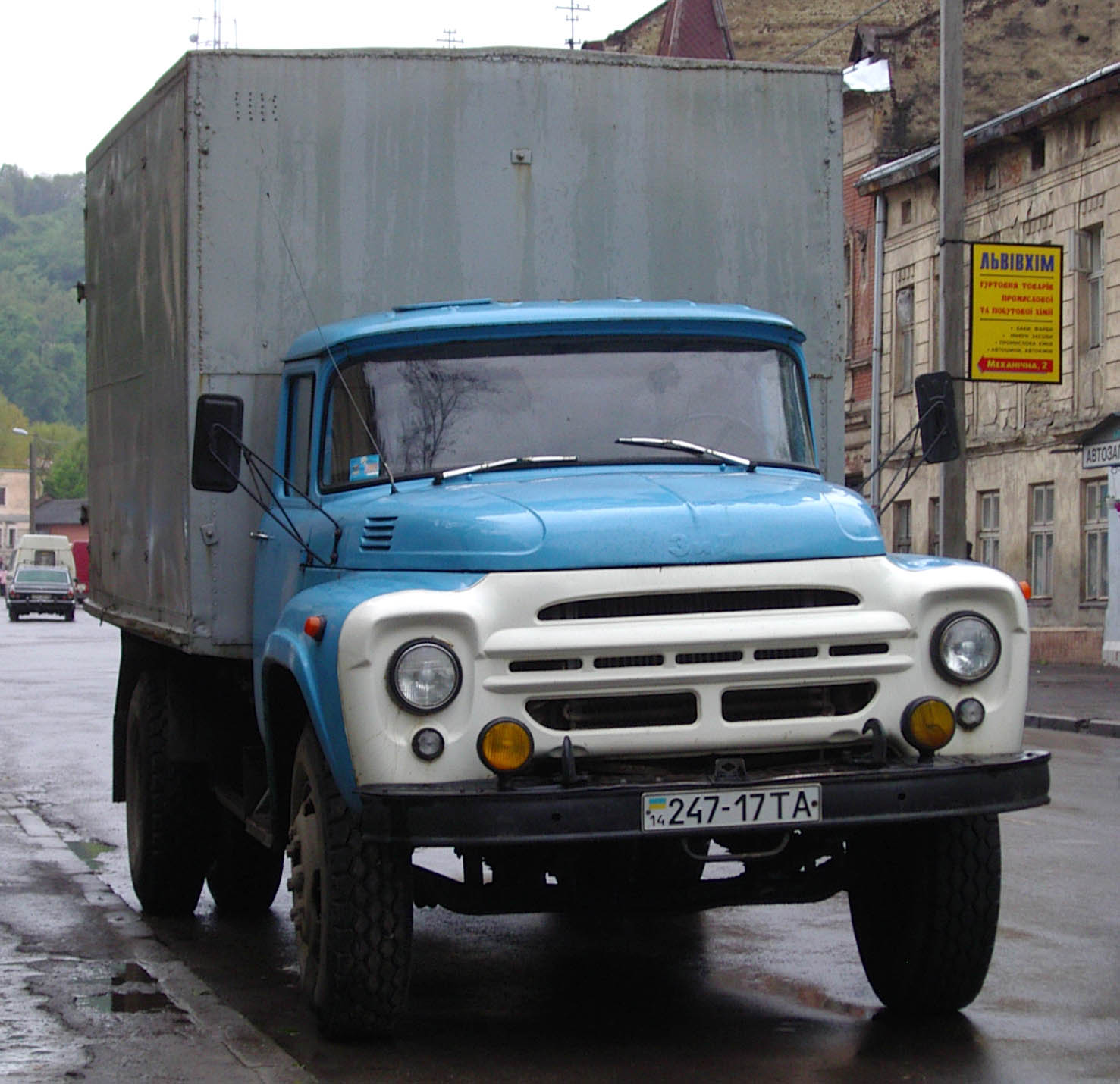
ZIL-130

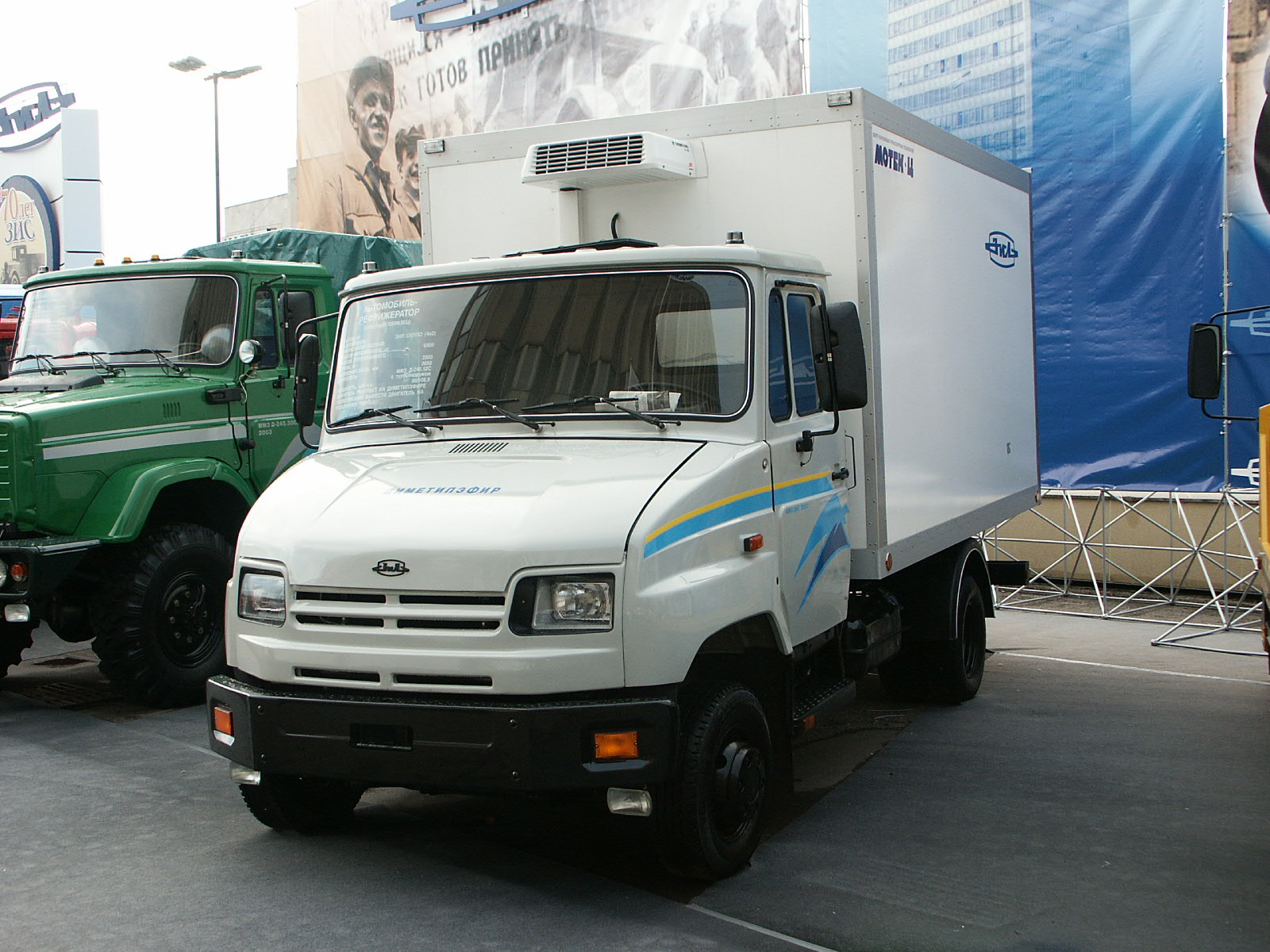
ZIL-5301

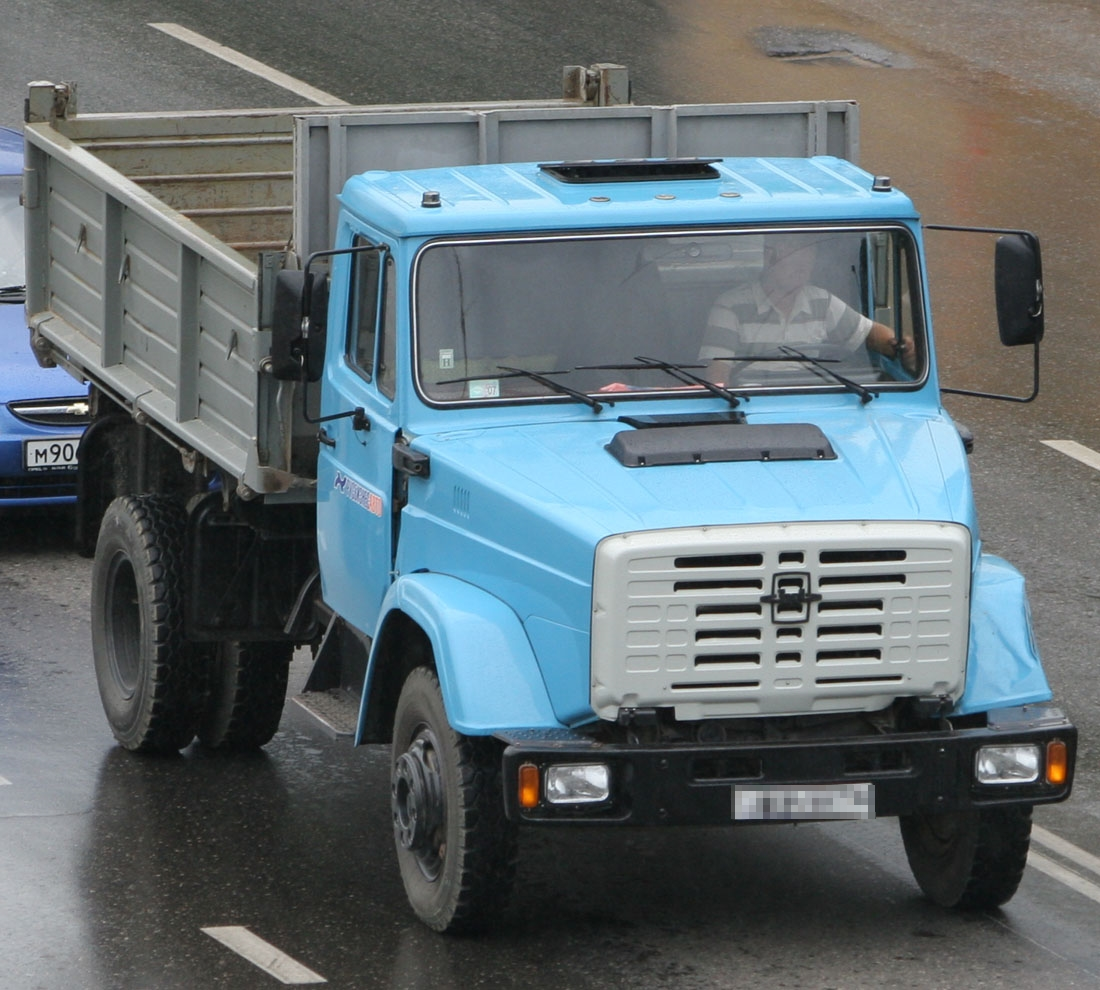
ZIL-4331

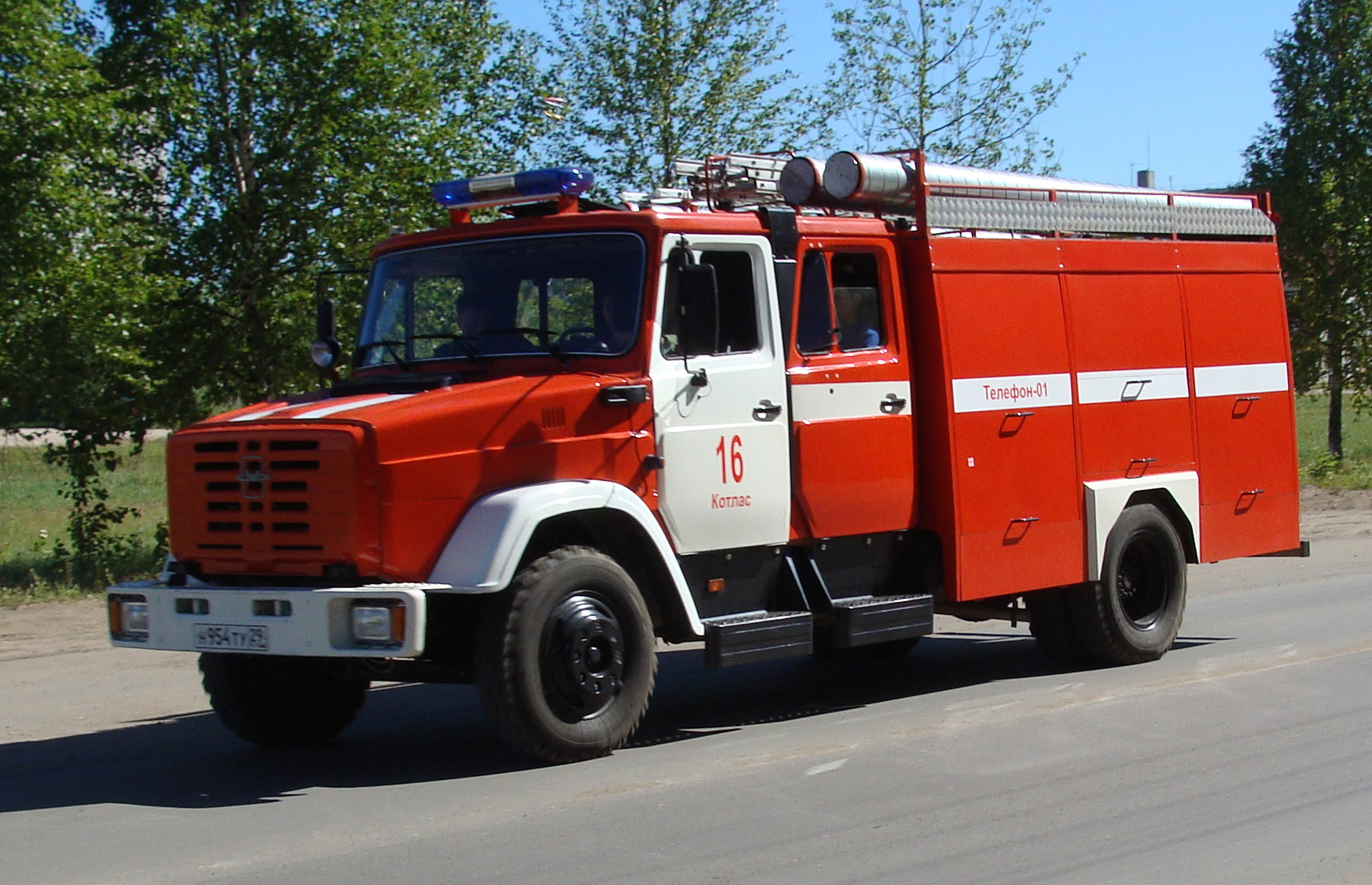
fire truck AC 3.2-40 (ZIL-4331)

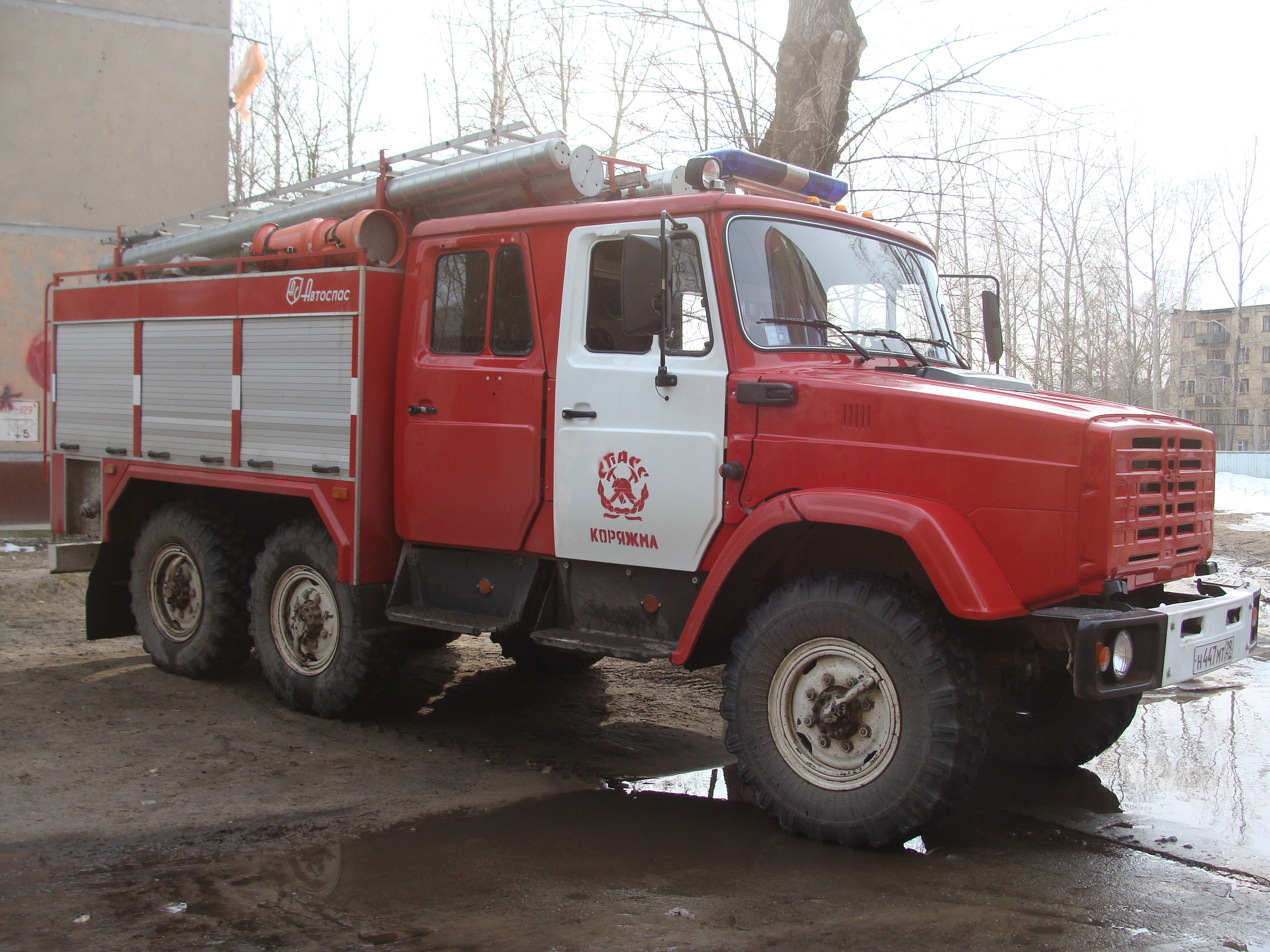
fire truck AC 3,0-40 (ZIL-4334)

- AMO-F-15 (1924-1931, produced in agreement with Fiat, based on the Fiat F-15 Ter)
- ru:АМО-2 (1930-1931; based on CKD kits of Autocar Dispatch SD trucks)
- ru:AMO-3 (1931-1933; Soviet-built version of AMO-2)
- ru:AMO-7 (1932, prototype tractor-trailer based on AMO-3)
- ru:AMO-20 (1929, prototype modernized version of AMO-F-15)
- ZIS-5 (1933-1948, 1.5-ton truck)
- ZIS-6 (1934-1941, three-axle version of ZIS-5)
- ZIS-9 (projected long-wheelbase version of ZIS-6; never built)
- ZIS-10 (1938-1941, tractor-trailer version of ZIS-5)
- ZIS-11 (1934, extra long wheelbase version of ZIS-5)
- ZIS-12 (1934-1941, long wheelbase version of ZIS-5)
- ZIS-13 (1936-1939, gas generator version, based on ZIS-14)
- ZIS-14 (1934, export version of ZIS-12)
- ZIS-15 (prototype modernized replacement for ZIS-5, 1938; cancelled due to WWII)
- ZIS-18 (gas generator version; similar to ZIS-13 but based on the ZIS-5)
- ZIS-19 (1939-1946, construction dump truck based on ZIS-5) - built by MMZ from 1947 to 1949
- ZIS-20 (prototype construction dump truck based on ZIS-5)
- ZIS-21 (1939-1941, gas generation version based on ZIS-5, powered by wood gas)
- ZIS-22 (Halftrack, 1940-1941, based on ZIS-5)
- ZIS-23 (three axle prototype based on ZIS-15; never built)
- ZIS-24 (four-wheel-drive prototype based on ZIS-15; never built)
- ZIS-25 (gas-powered vehicle based on ZIS-15; never built)
- ZIS-26 (tractor unit based on ZIS-15; never built)
- ZIS-27 (dump truck version of ZIS-15; never built)
- ZIS-28 (multifuel vehicle with a ZIS-D7-based engine, based on ZIS-15; never built)
- ZIS-30 (1940-1943, multifuel version of ZIS-5)
- ZIS-31 (gas generation version based on ZIS-5, powered by coal gas)
- ZIS-32 (1941, 4x4 version of ZIS-5)
- ZIS-33 (1940, halftrack, based on ZIS-5)
- ZIS-34 (1940-1941, shortened version of ZIS-6 for BA-11 armored car)
- ZIS-35 (improved ZIS-33)
- ZIS-36 (1944, prototype 6x6 version of ZIS-5)
- ZIS-41 (1940, simplified version of ZIS-21)
- ZIS-42 (Halftrack, 1942-1944, based on ZIS-5)
- ZIS-43 (1944, armed version of ZIS-42)
- ZIS-50 (1946, re-engined ZIS-5; transitional model to the ZIS-150)
- ZIS-121 (1952-1959, tractor-trailer version of ZIS-151)
- ZIS-125 (prototype 5-ton version of ZIS-150)
- ZIS-128 (1954, prototype for ZIL-131)
- ZIS-150 (1948-1958)
- ZIS-151 (1948-1958, three-axle version of ZIS-150)
- ZIS-153 (1952, prototype halftrack based on ZIS-151)
- ZIS-156 (1949-1957, gas generator version of ZIS-150)
- ZIS-253 (1947, prototype 3.5 ton truck)
- ZIS-585 (1949-1955, dump-truck version of ZIS-150) - built by MMZ
- ZIL-130 (1964-1994, production moved to Ural Automobiles and Motors)
- ZIL-131 (1966-1994, production moved to Ural Automobiles and Motors)
- ZIL-132 (1960, prototype off road vehicle)
- ZIL-133 (1975-2000, three-axle version of ZIL-130)
- ZIL-134 (1957, prototype off road vehicle)
- ZIL-135 (1959-1963, military transport and self-propelled artillery truck) - production moved to BAZ
- ZIL-136 (1957, prototype off road vehicle)
- ZIL-137 (1970, prototype off road tractor-trailer based on ZIL-131) - built by BAZ
- ZIL-138 (1977-1987, LPG powered version of ZIL-130)
- ZIL-157 (1958-1978, production moved to Ural Automobiles and Motors)
- ZIL-157R (1957, prototype off road vehicle based on ZIL-157)
- ZIL-164 (1957-1964, improved ZIS-150)
- ZIL-165 (1958, prototype for ZIL-131)
- ZIL-166 (1961-1966, gas generator version of ZIL-164)
- ZIL-E167 (1963)
- ZIL-169G (prototype for ZIL-4331)
- ZIL-E169A (1964, prototype cab-over truck)
- ZIL-170 (1969, prototype for KamAZ-5320)
- ZIL-175 (1969, two-axle version of ZIL-170, prototype for Kamaz)
- ZIL-485 (amphibious vehicle based on ZIS-151)
- ZIL-553 (cement mixer based on ZIL-164)
- ZIL-555 (1964, dump truck based on ZIL-130)
- ZIL-585 (1957-1966, dump truck based on ZIL-164)
- ZIL-2502 (dump truck based on ZIL-5301)
- ZIL-3302 (1992, prototype truck based on ZIL-119)
- ZIL-3906 (off-road vehicle based on the ZIL-4327)
- ZIL-4305 (1983, prototype truck based on ZIL-4104)
- ZIL-4311 (1976, prototype replacement for ZIL-157)
- ZIL-4327 (1998-2012)
- ZIL-4329 (1994)
- ZIL-4331 (1987-2012)
- ZIL-4334 (1995-2015)
- ZIL-4514 (dump truck based on ZIL-133)
- ZIL-4972 (1992)
- ZIL-5301 "Bychok" ("Little Bull") (1996)
- ZIL-5901 (1970)
- ZIL-6404 (1997)
- ZIL-6309 (1999-2002)
- ZIL-6409 (1999-2002)
- ZIL-432720
- ZIL-432930 (2004)
- ZIL-433180 (2004)
- ZIL-436200 (2010)
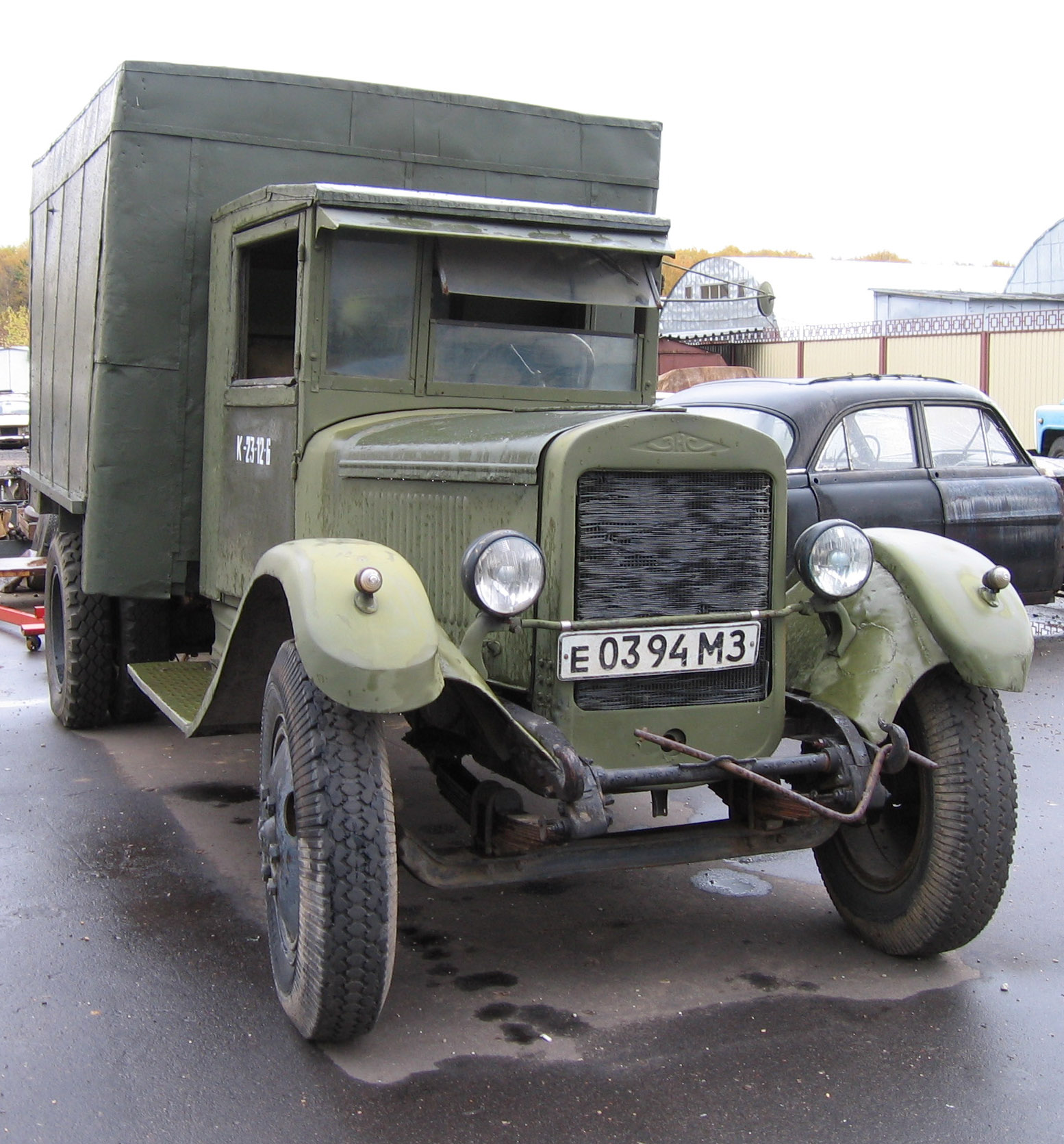
ZIS-5

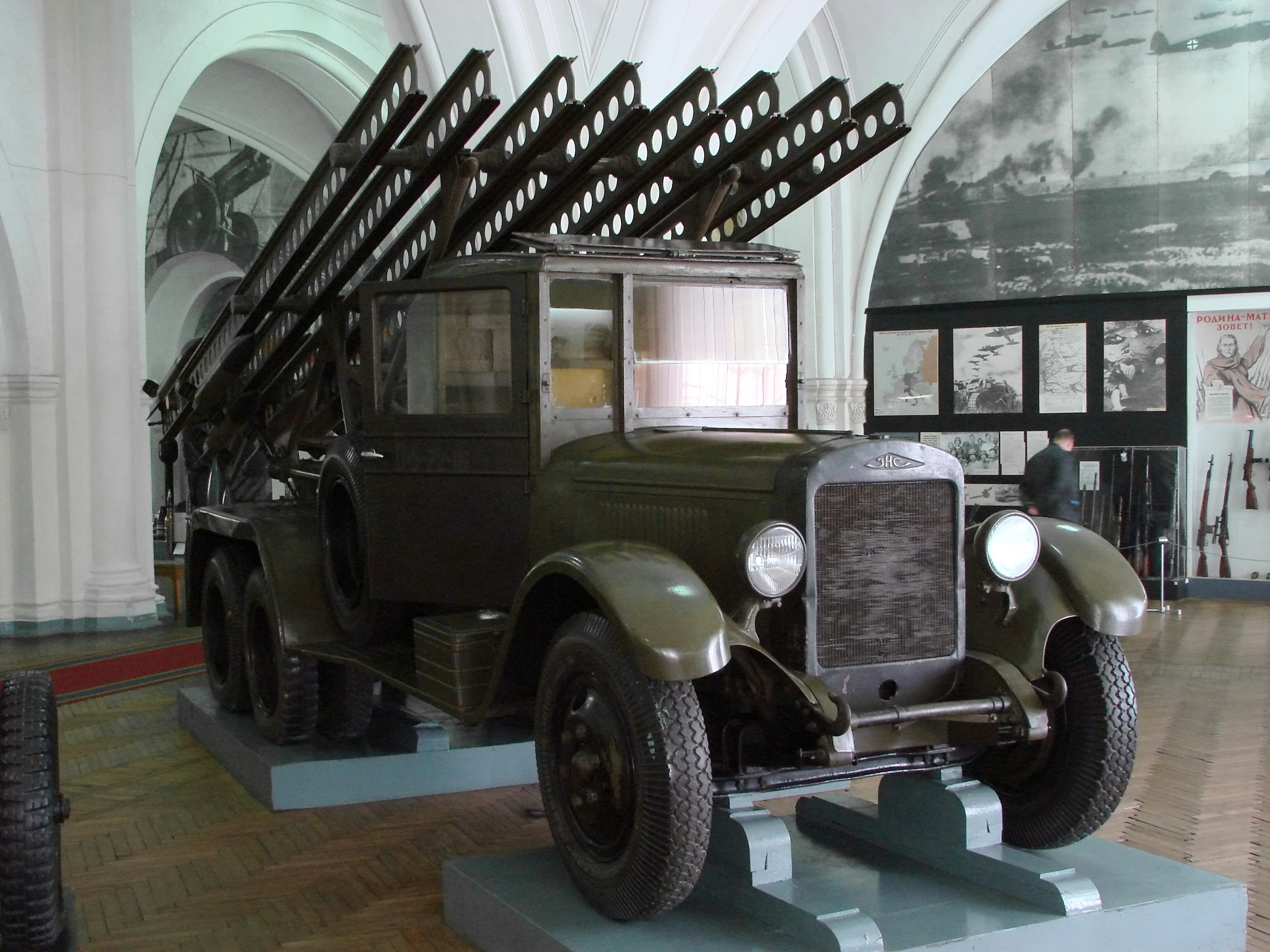
BM-13-16 on a ZIS-6 chassis

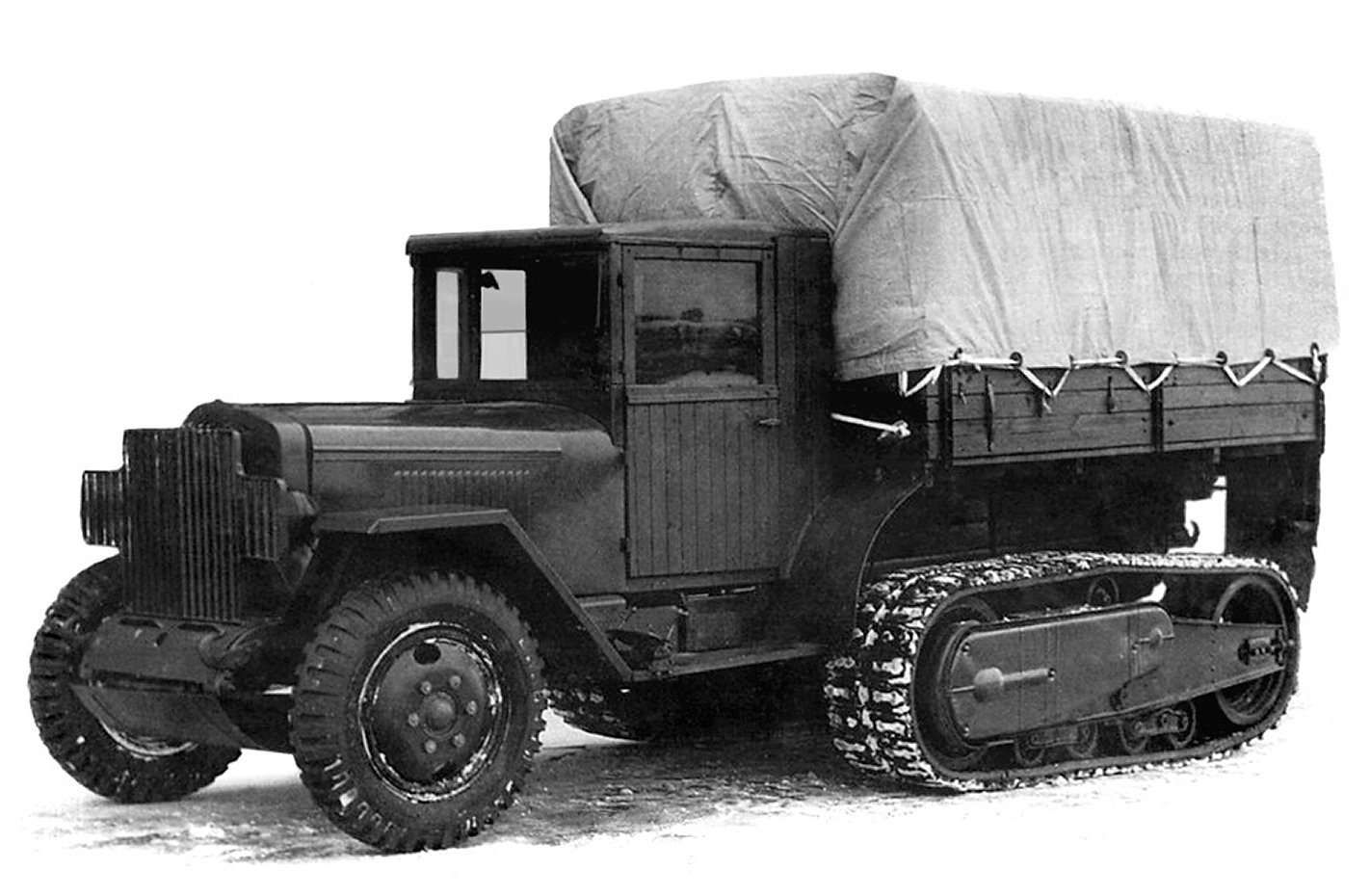
ZIS-42M

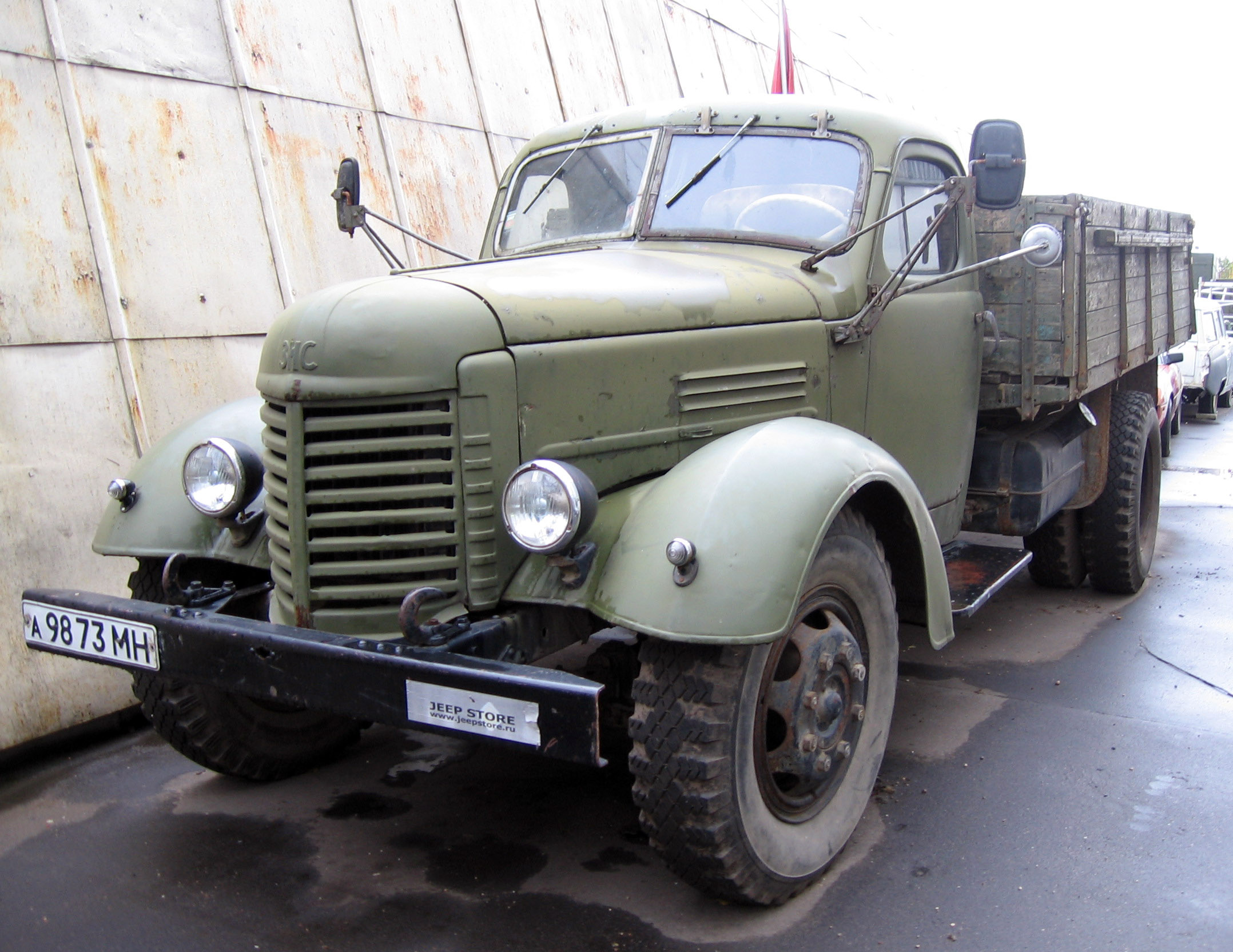
ZIS-150

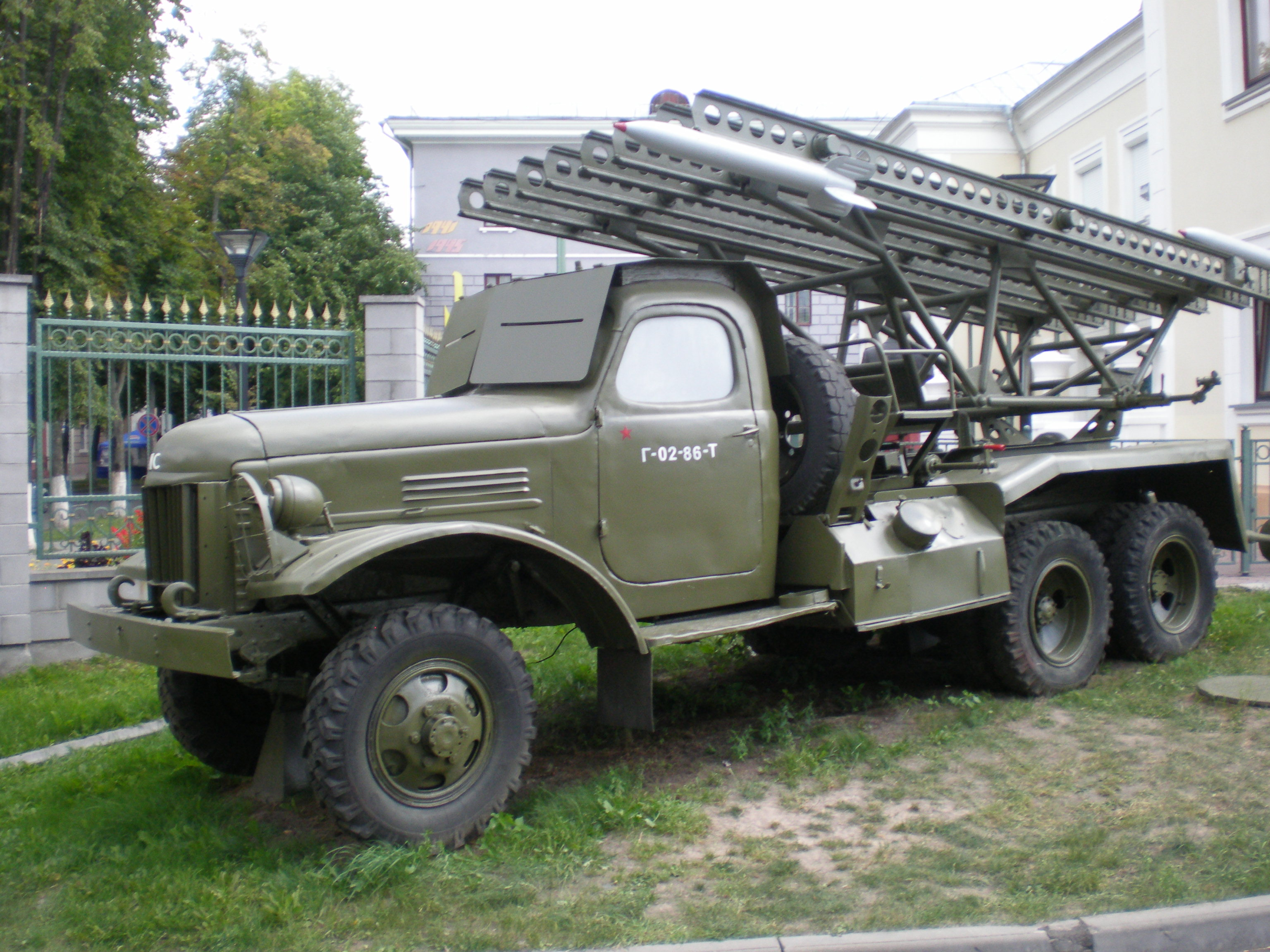
BM-13-16 on a ZIS-151

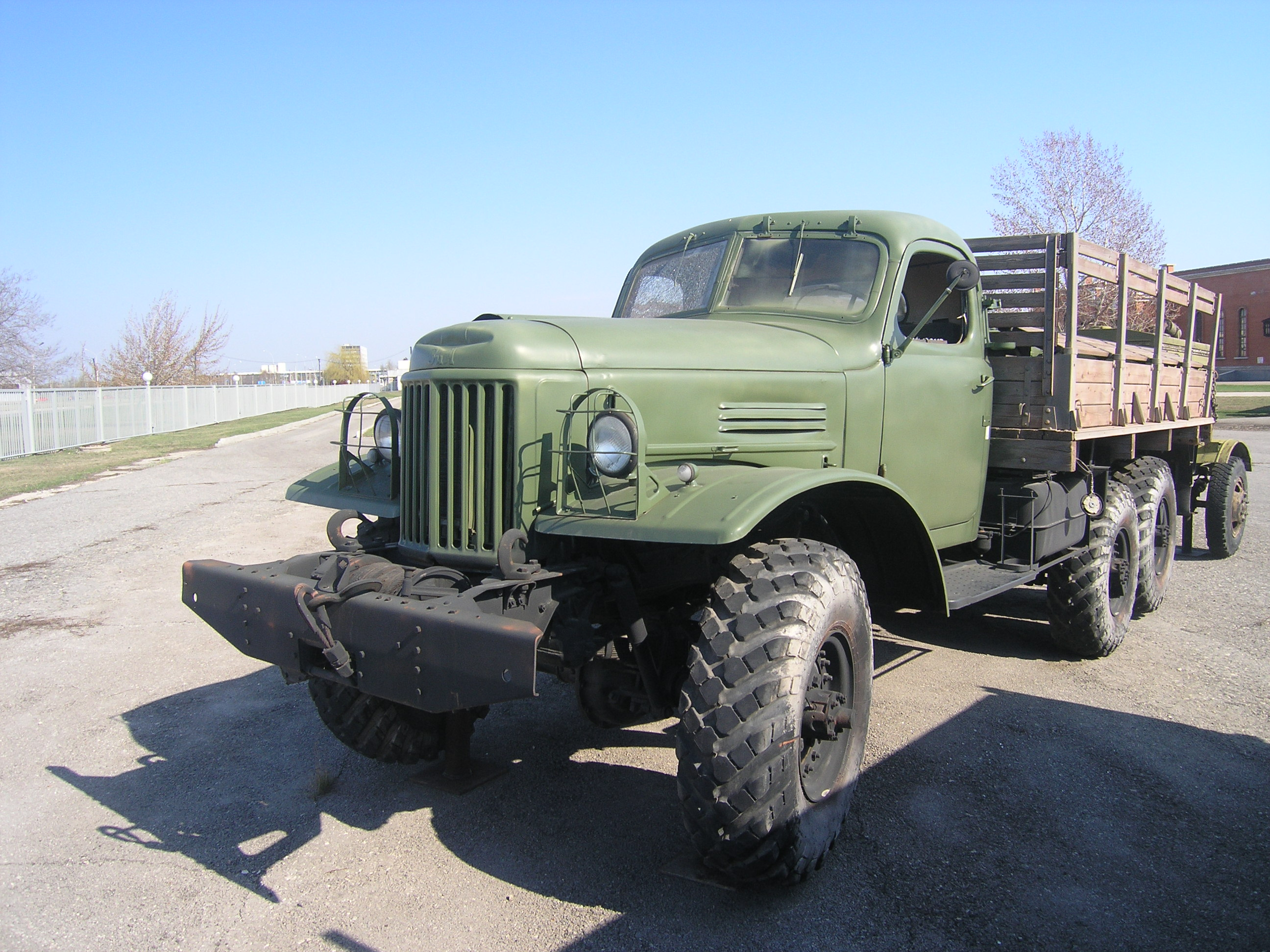
ZIL-157

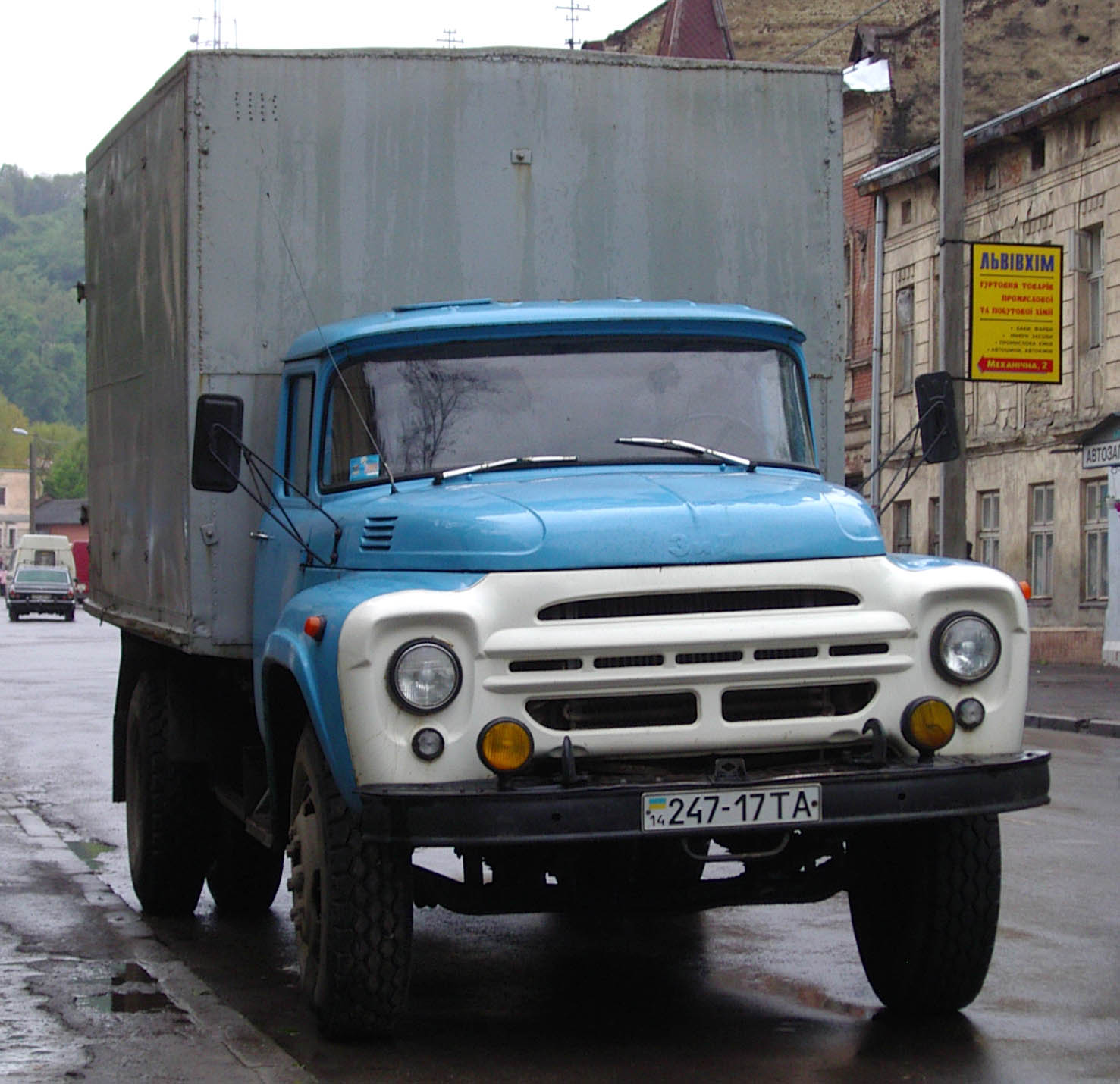
ZIL-130

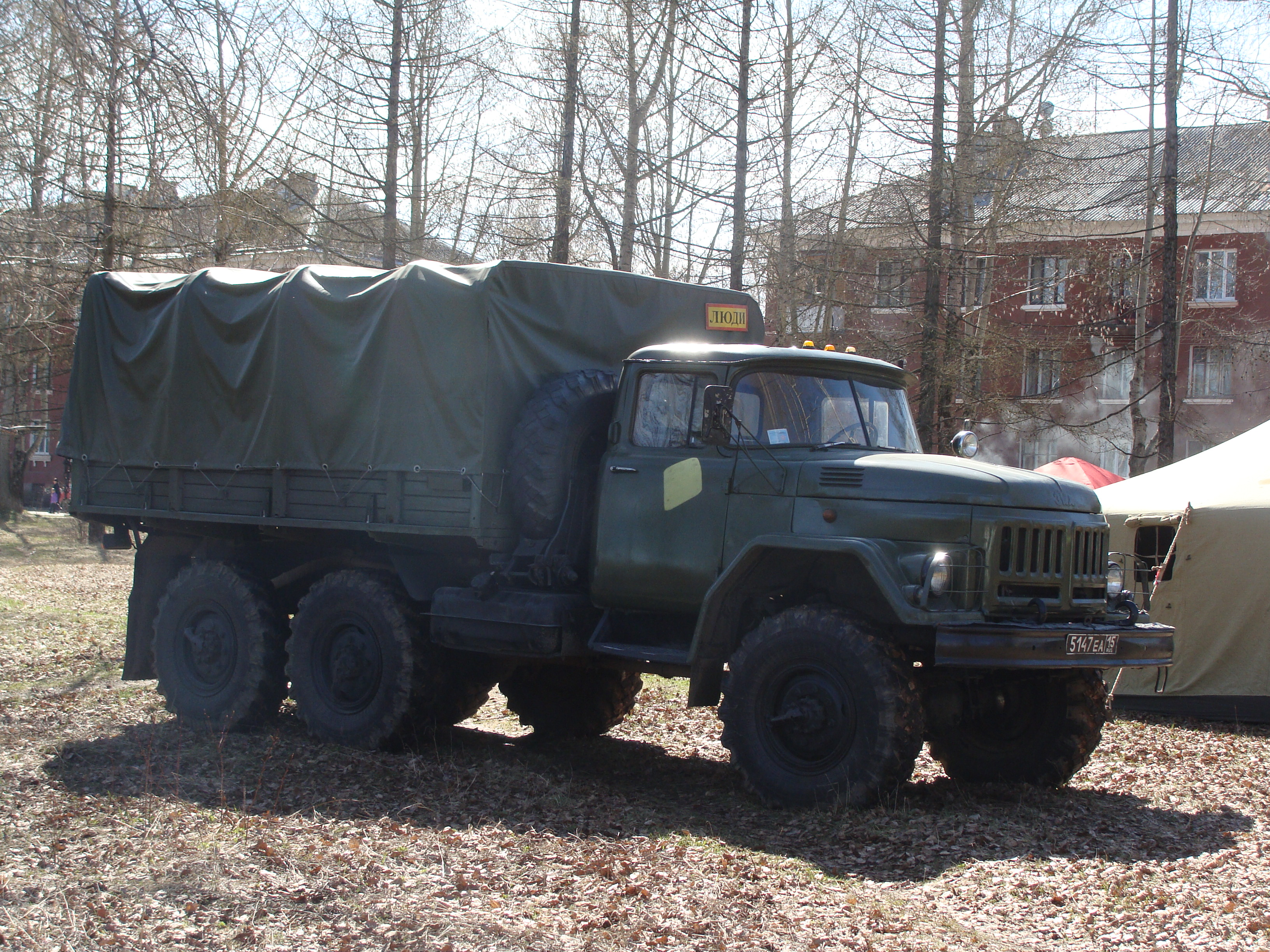
ZIL-131

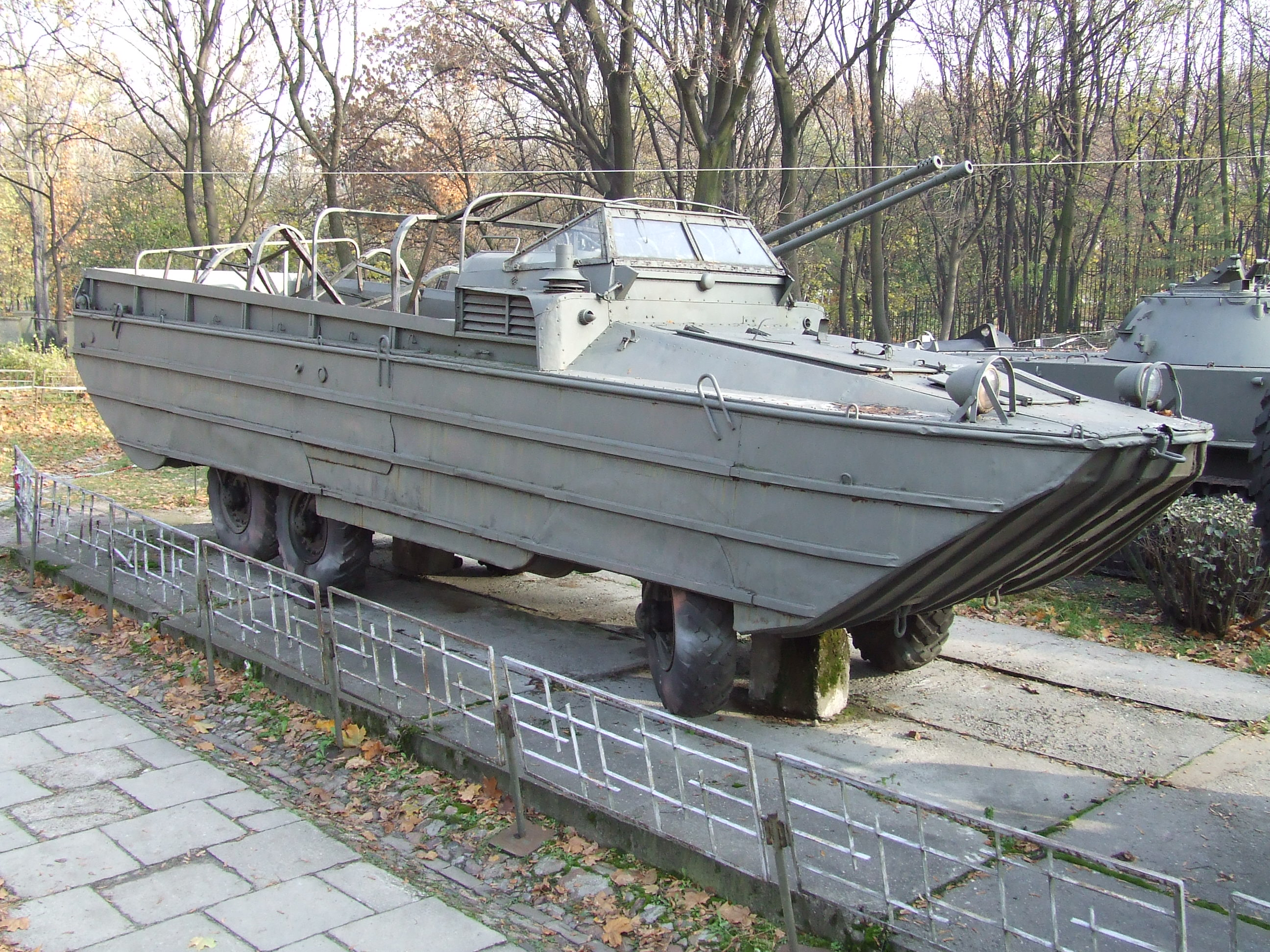
ZIL-485 BAV

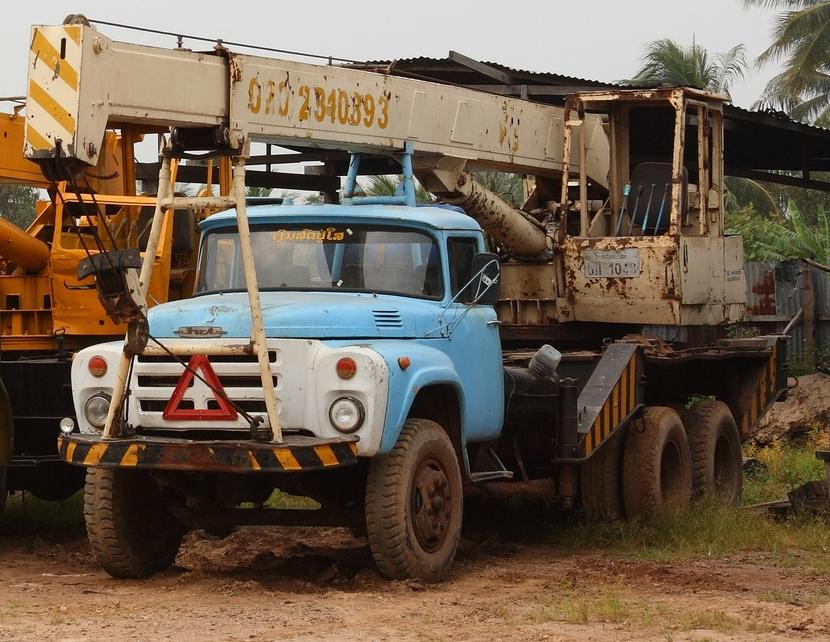
ZIL-133

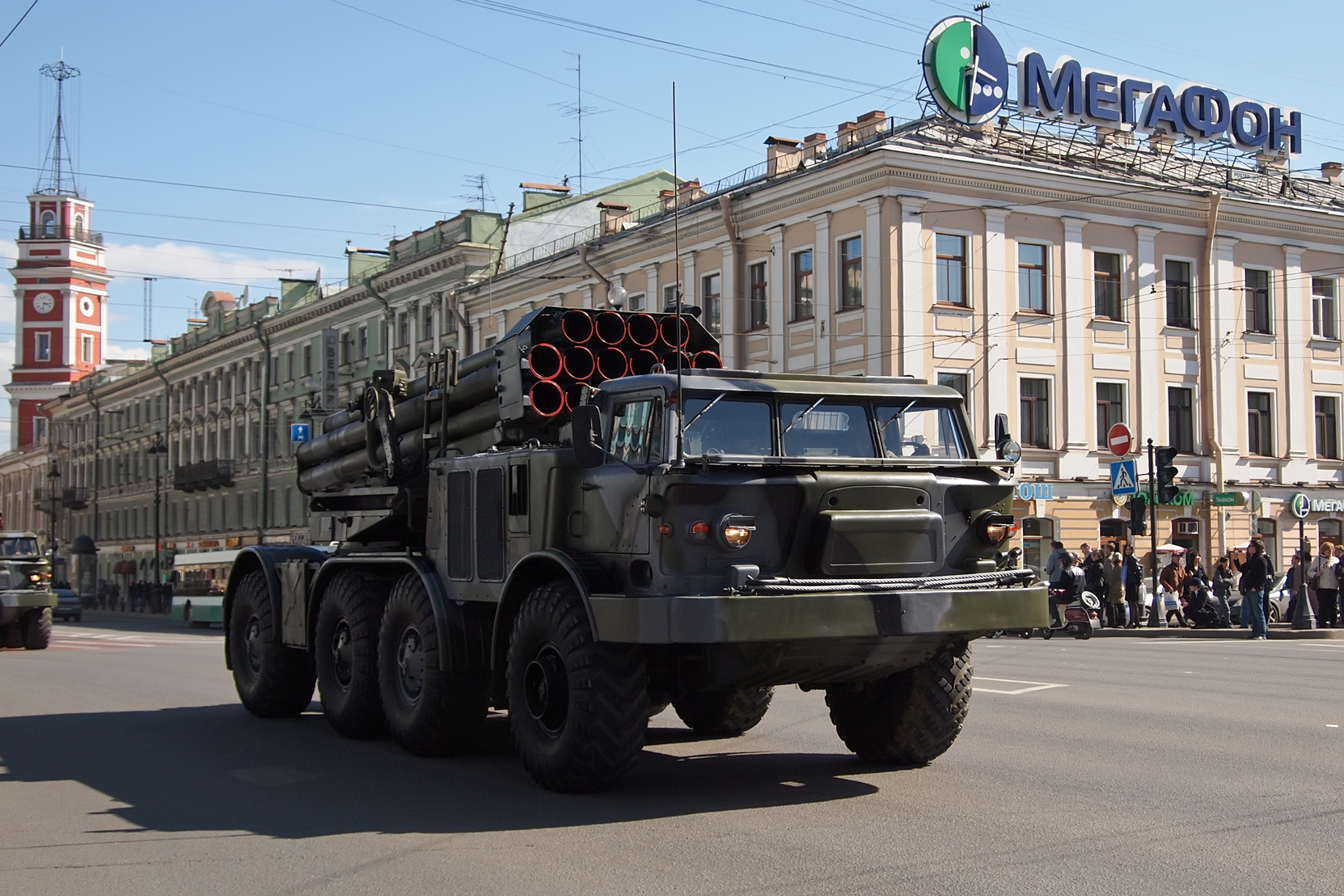
BM-27 Uragan on ZIL-135

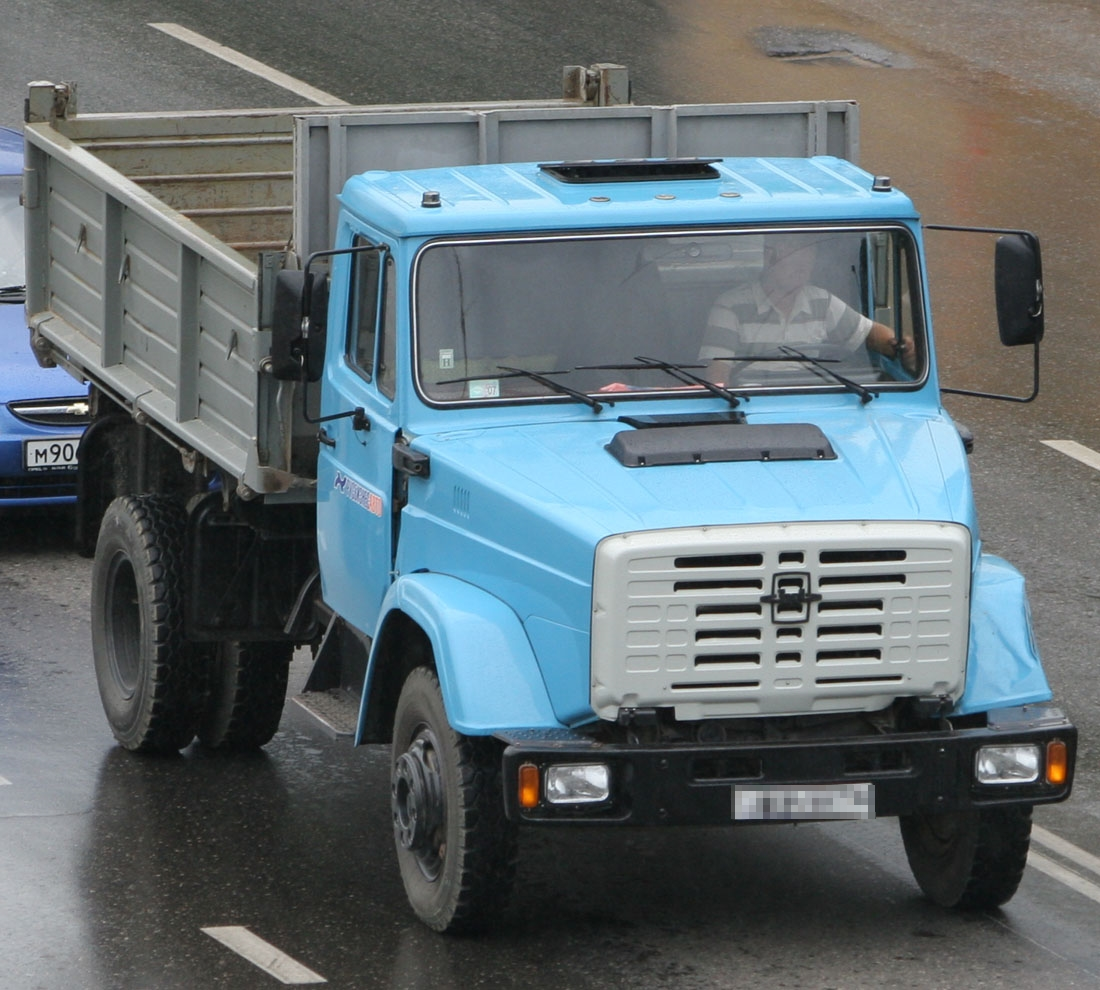
ZIL-4331

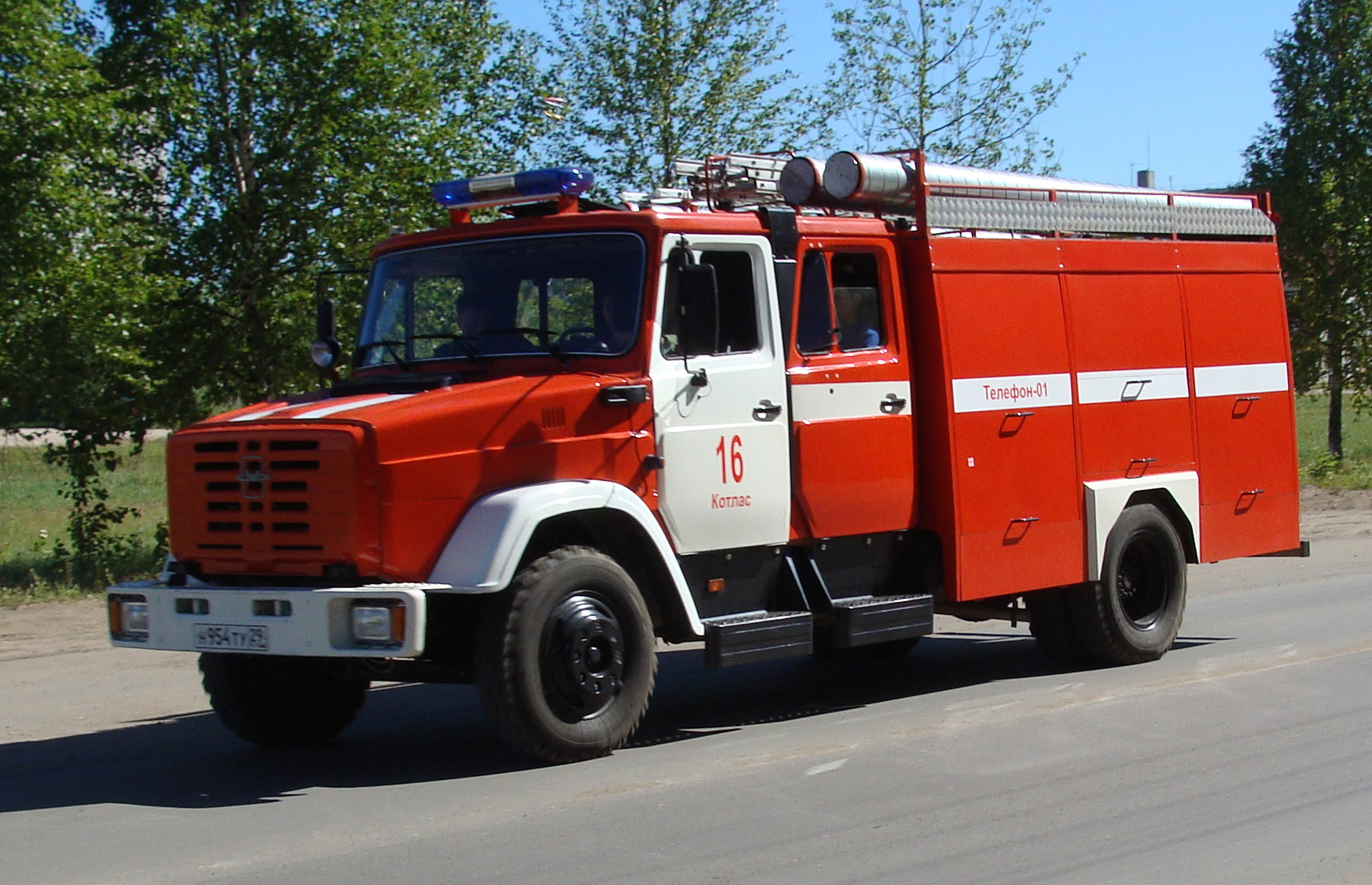
fire truck AC 3.2-40 (ZIL-4331)

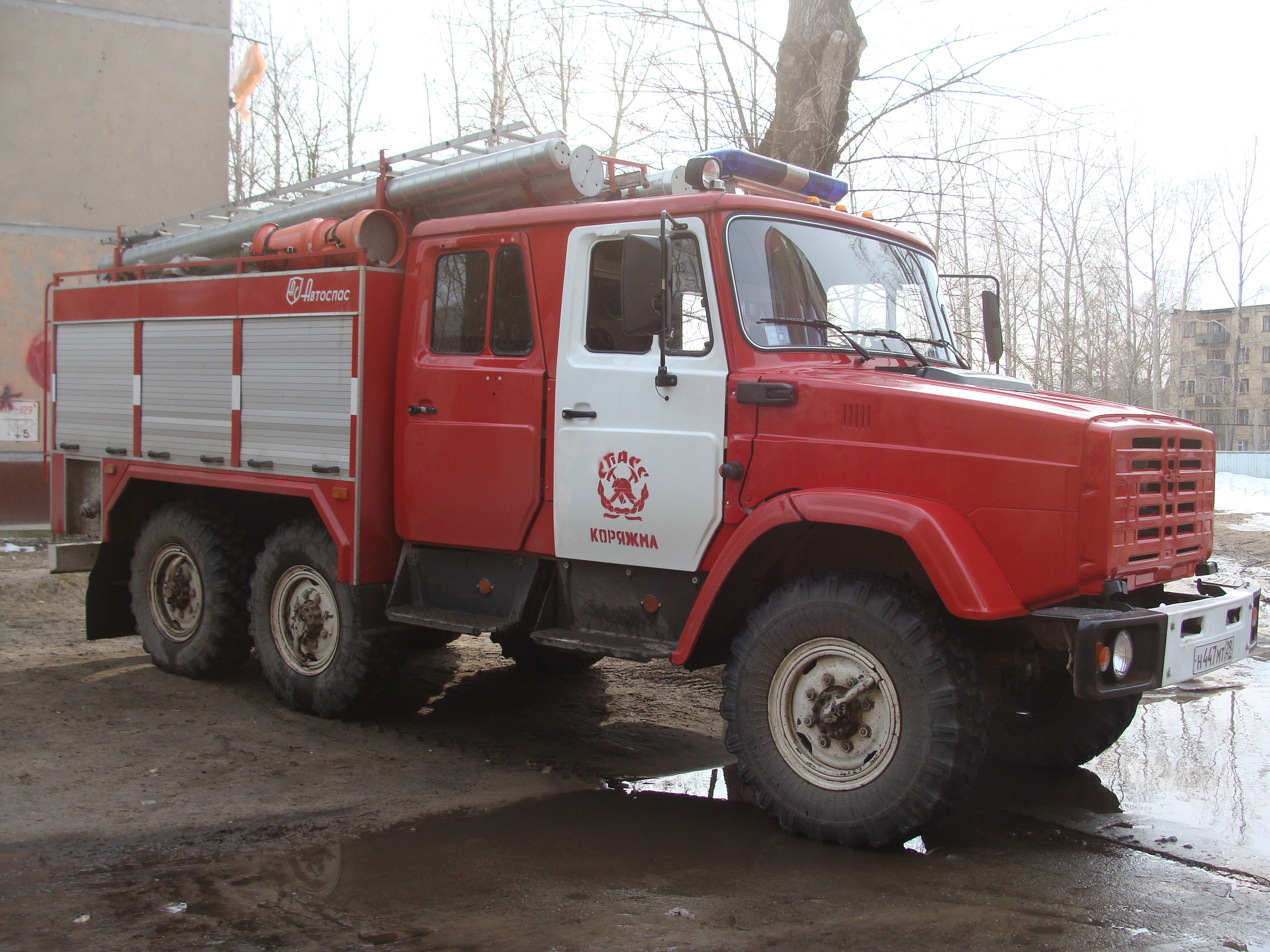
fire truck AC 3,0-40 (ZIL-4334)

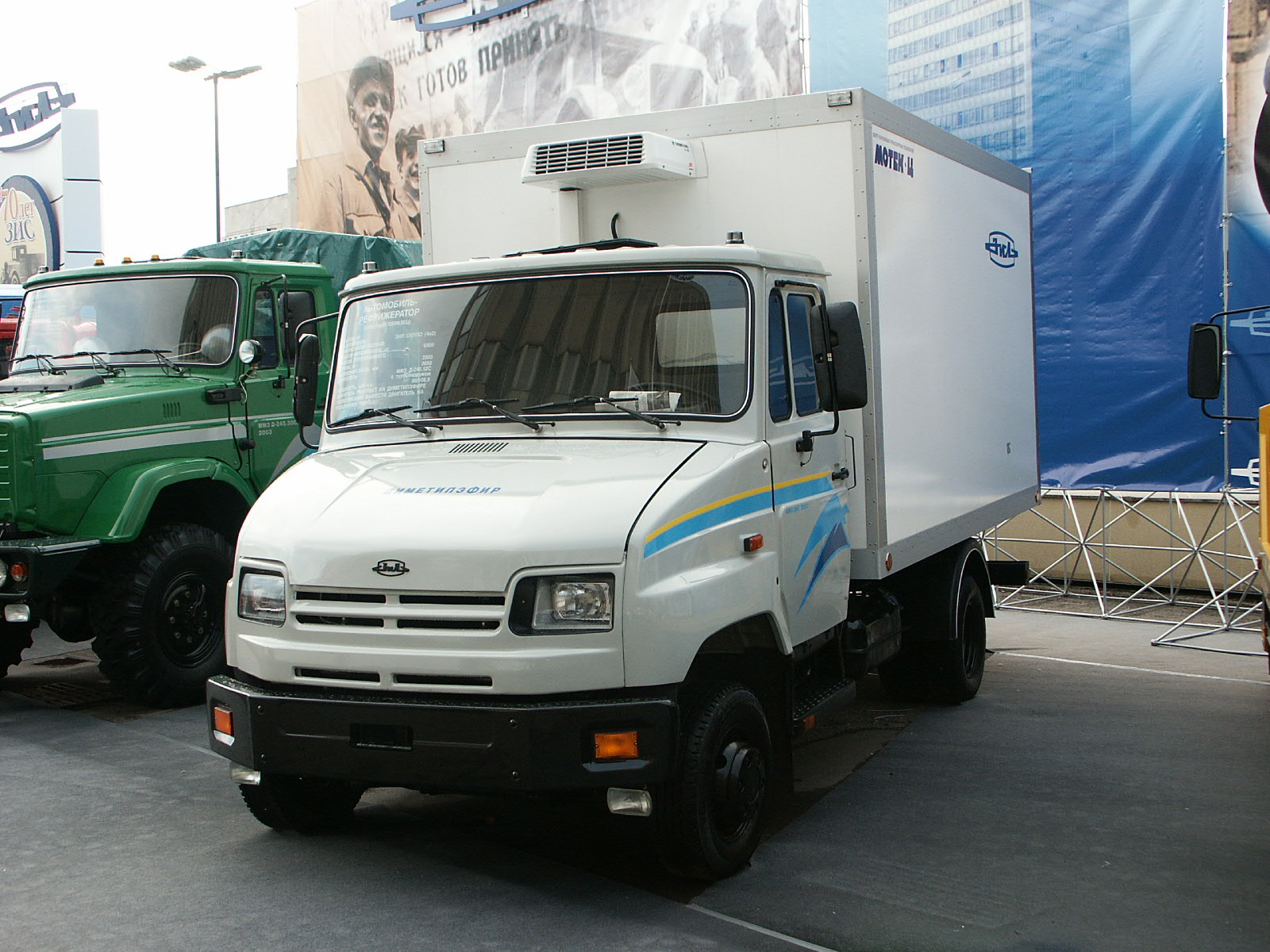
ZIL-5301 Bychok ("Bull")

=== Buses ===
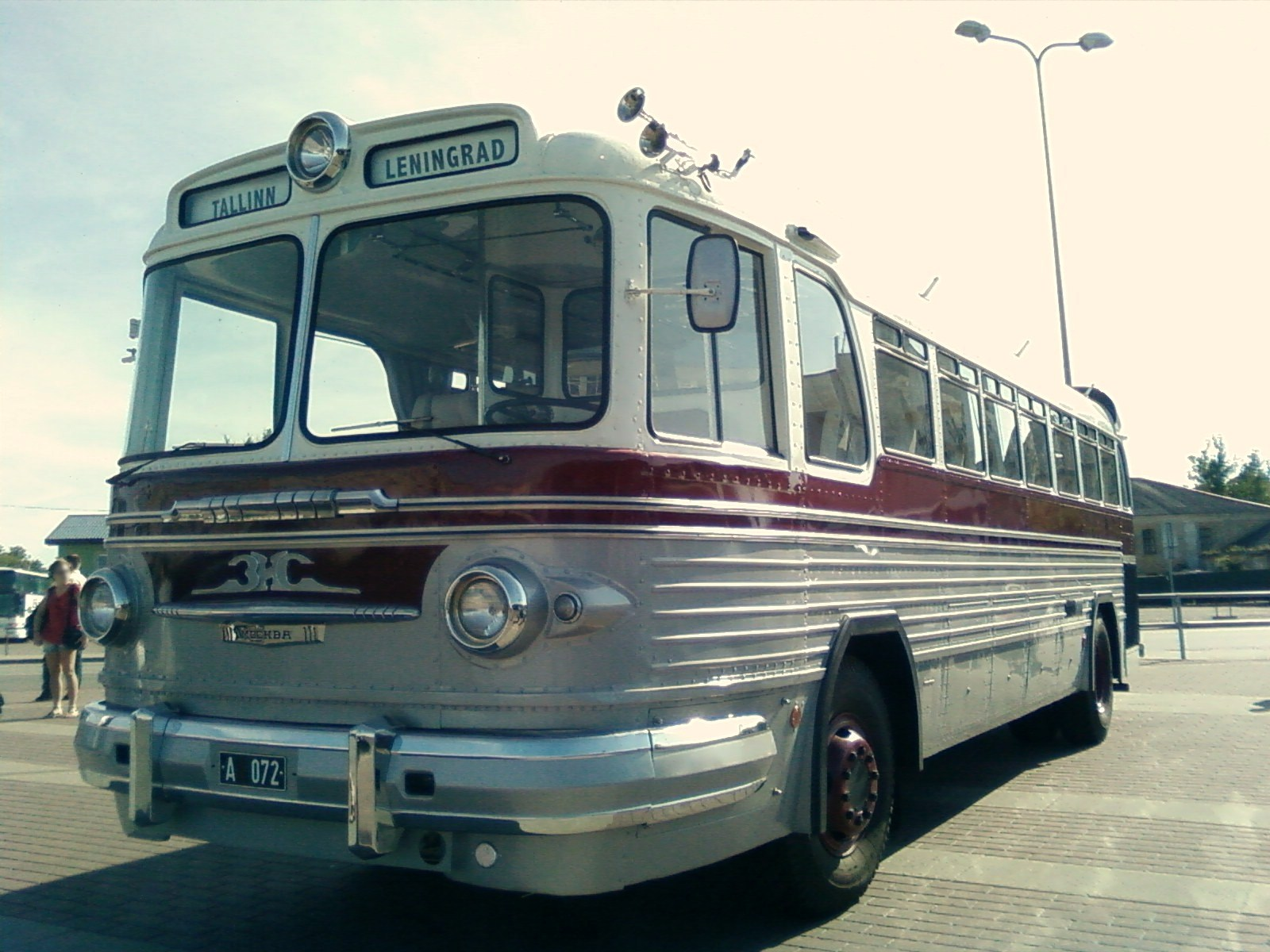
interurban bus ZIS-127

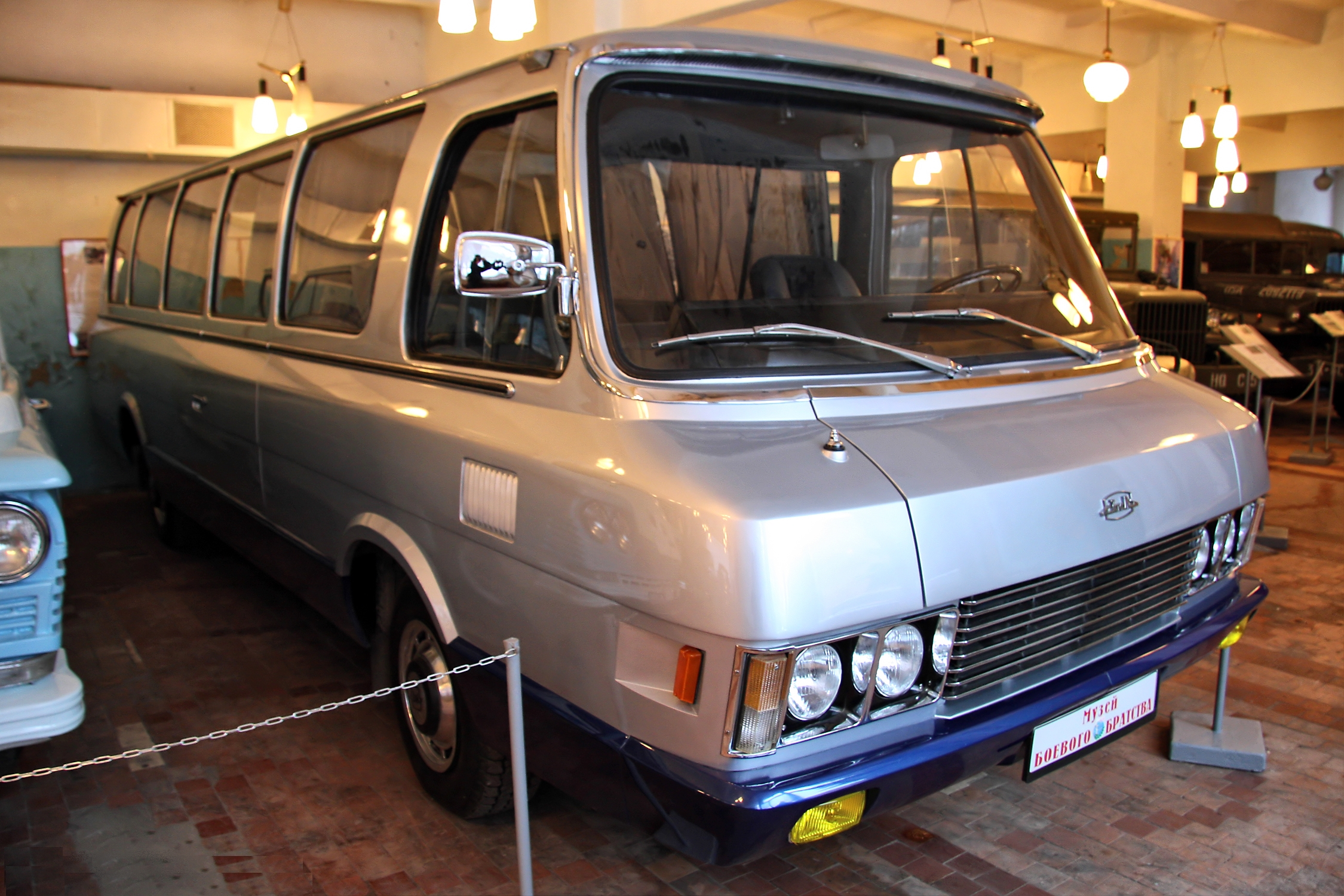
ZIL-119

- AKZ-1 (1947-1948, ZIS-150 chassis with ZIS-16 body; also known as ZIS-Aremkuz)
- AMO-4 (1932-1934, based on the AMO-3)
- ZIS-lux (prototype tourist bus, based on the ZIS-6 and ZIS-8, 1934)
- ZIS-8 (1934-1936, based on the ZIS-11)
- ZIS-16 (1938-1942, based on the ZIS-5)
- ZIS-17 (prototype, based on the ZIS-15, 1939)
- ZIS-44 (ambulance based on the ZIS-5V)
- ZIS-127 (1955-1961)
- ZIL-129 (1958, short-range version of ZIS-127)
- ZIS-154 (1946–1950)
- ZIS-155 (1949–1957)
- ZIL-118 "Yunost" (1962-1970, based on ZIL-111)
- ZIL-119 (1971-1994, based on ZIL-118; also called ZIL-118K)
- ZIL-158 (1957-1959, based on ZIL-164; production moved to LiAZ)
- ZIL-159 (1959, prototype rear-engine version of ZIL-158; cancelled due to ZiL focusing on truck production)
- ZIL-3207 (1991-1999, based on ZIL-41047)
- ZIL-3250 (1994–2012, based on ZIL-5301)
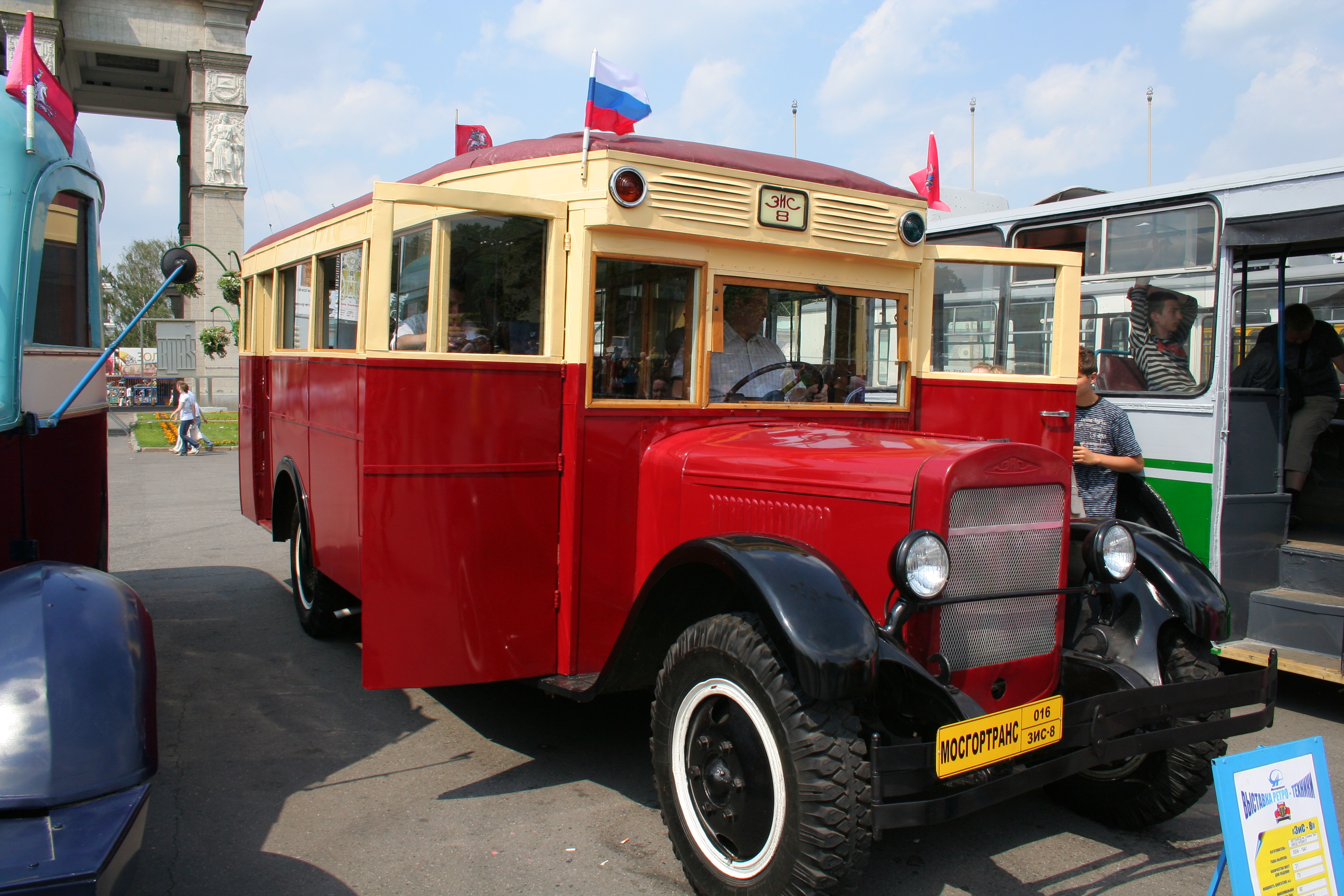
ZIS-8

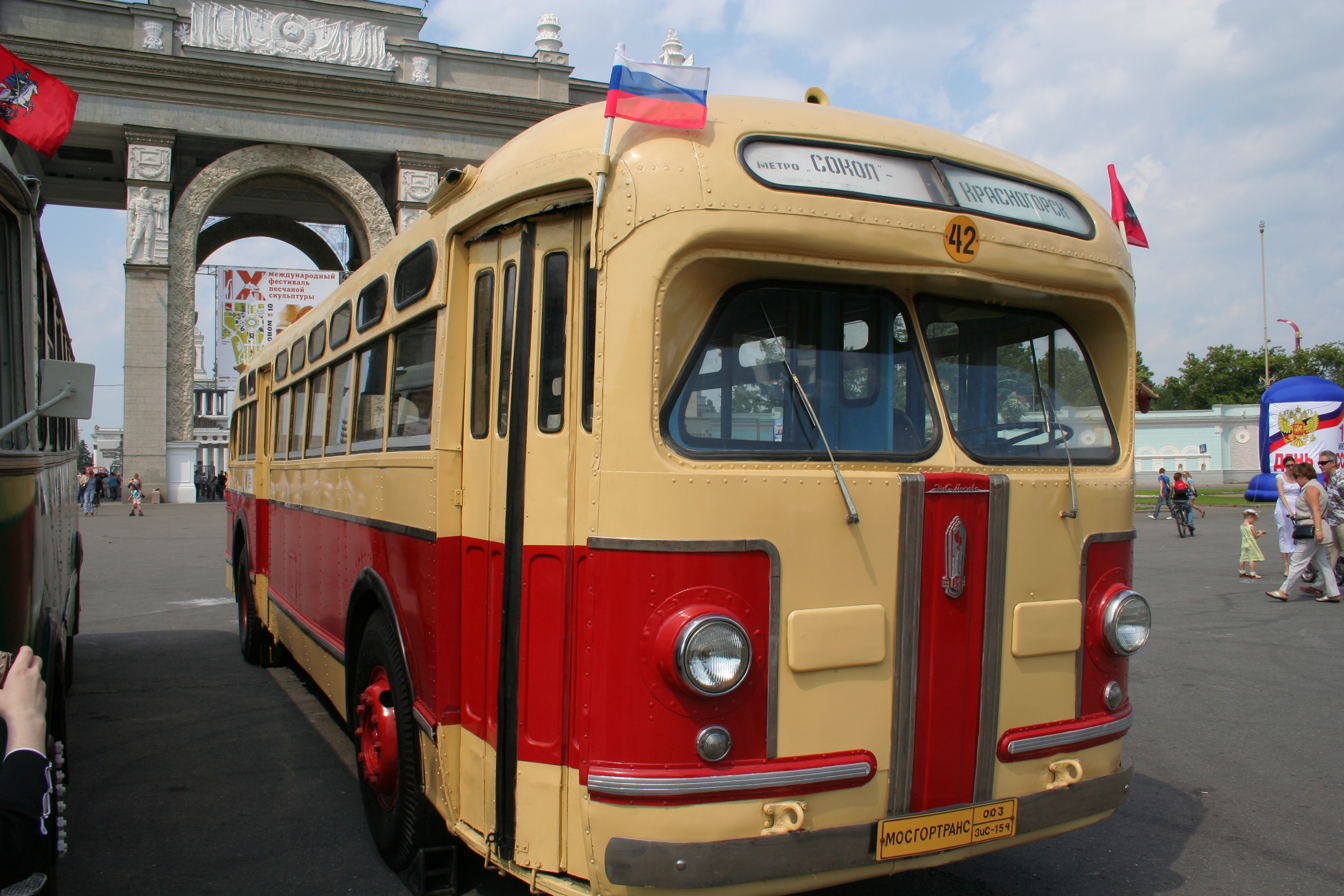
ZIS-154

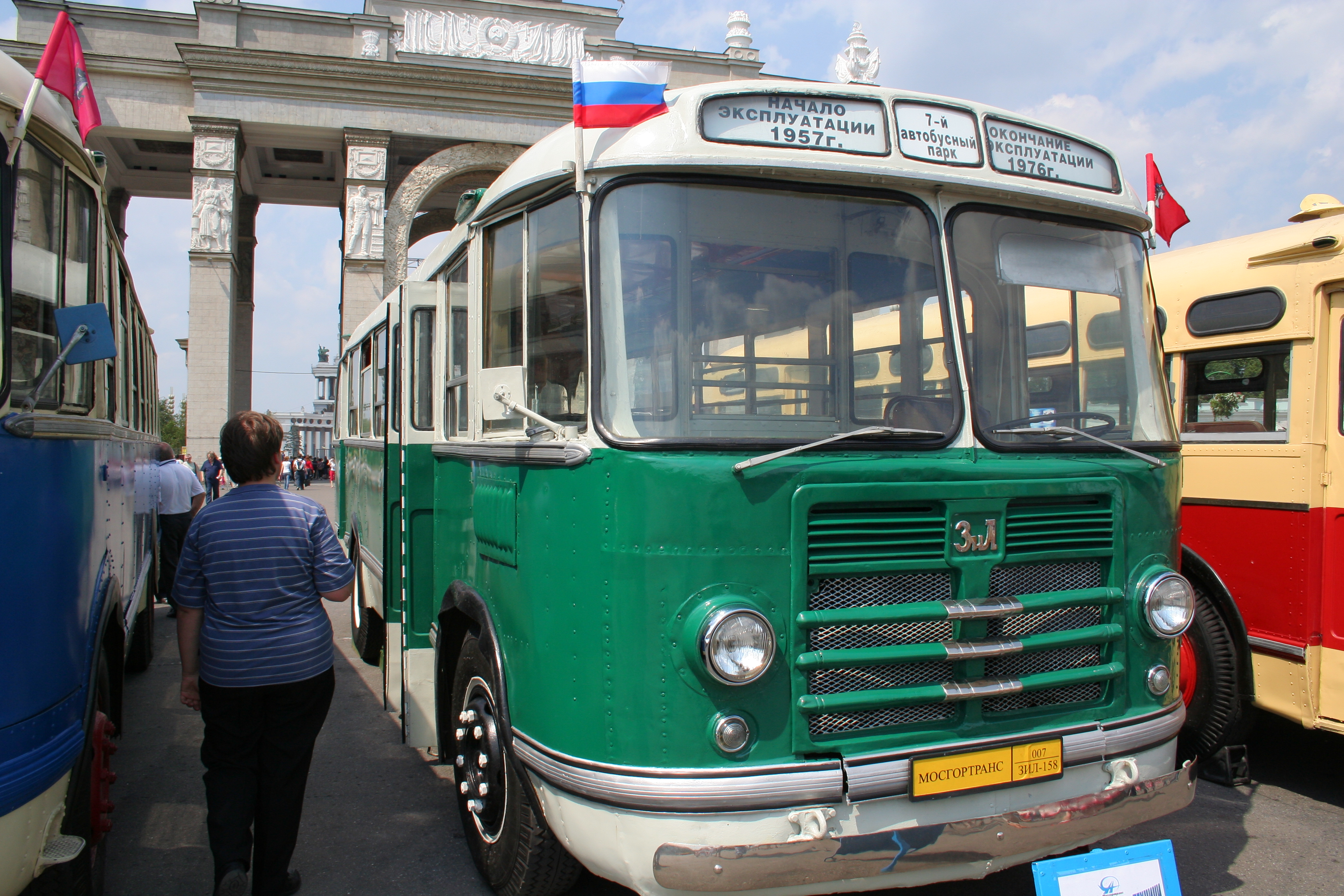
ZIL-158

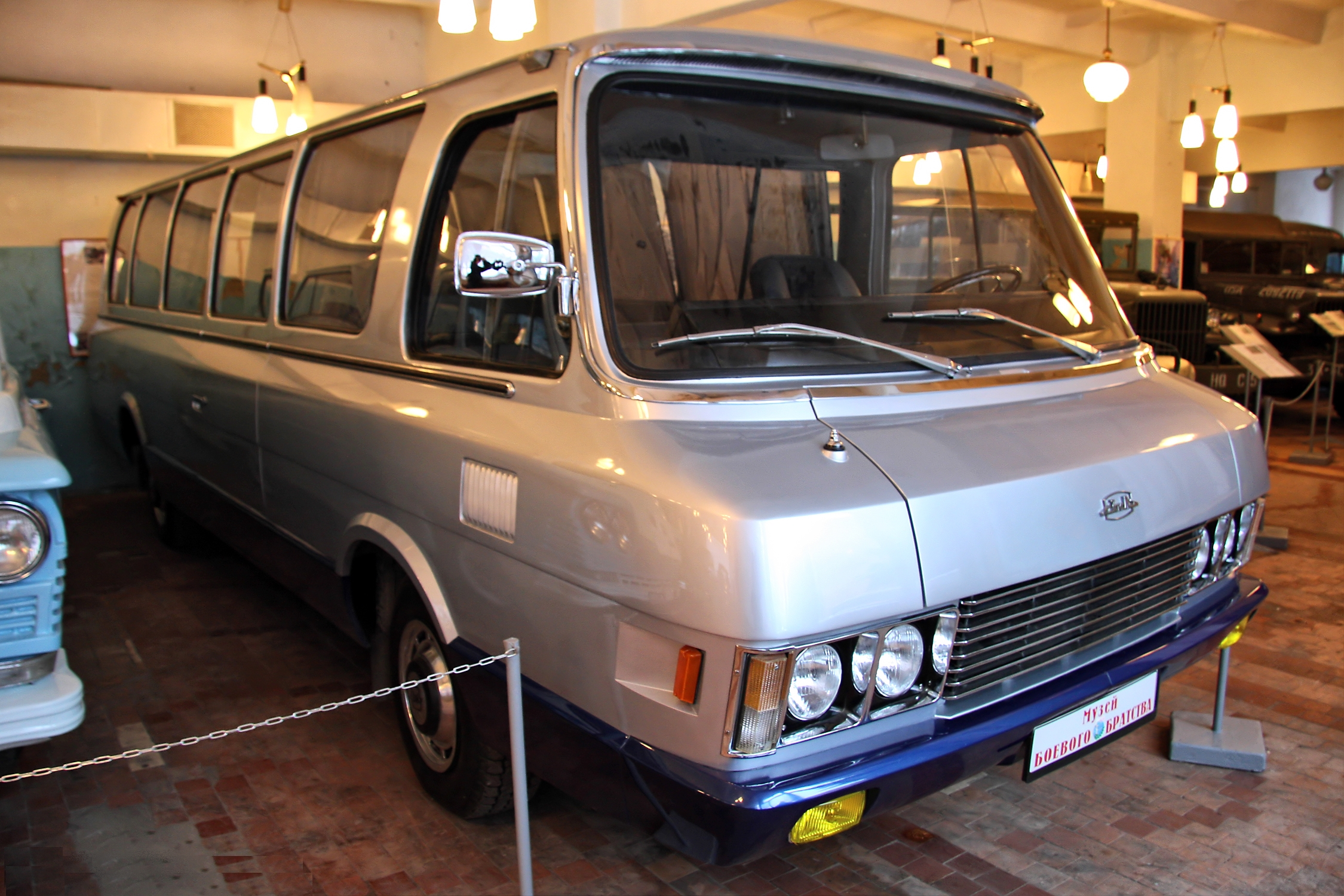
ZIL-119

=== Sport and racing cars ===
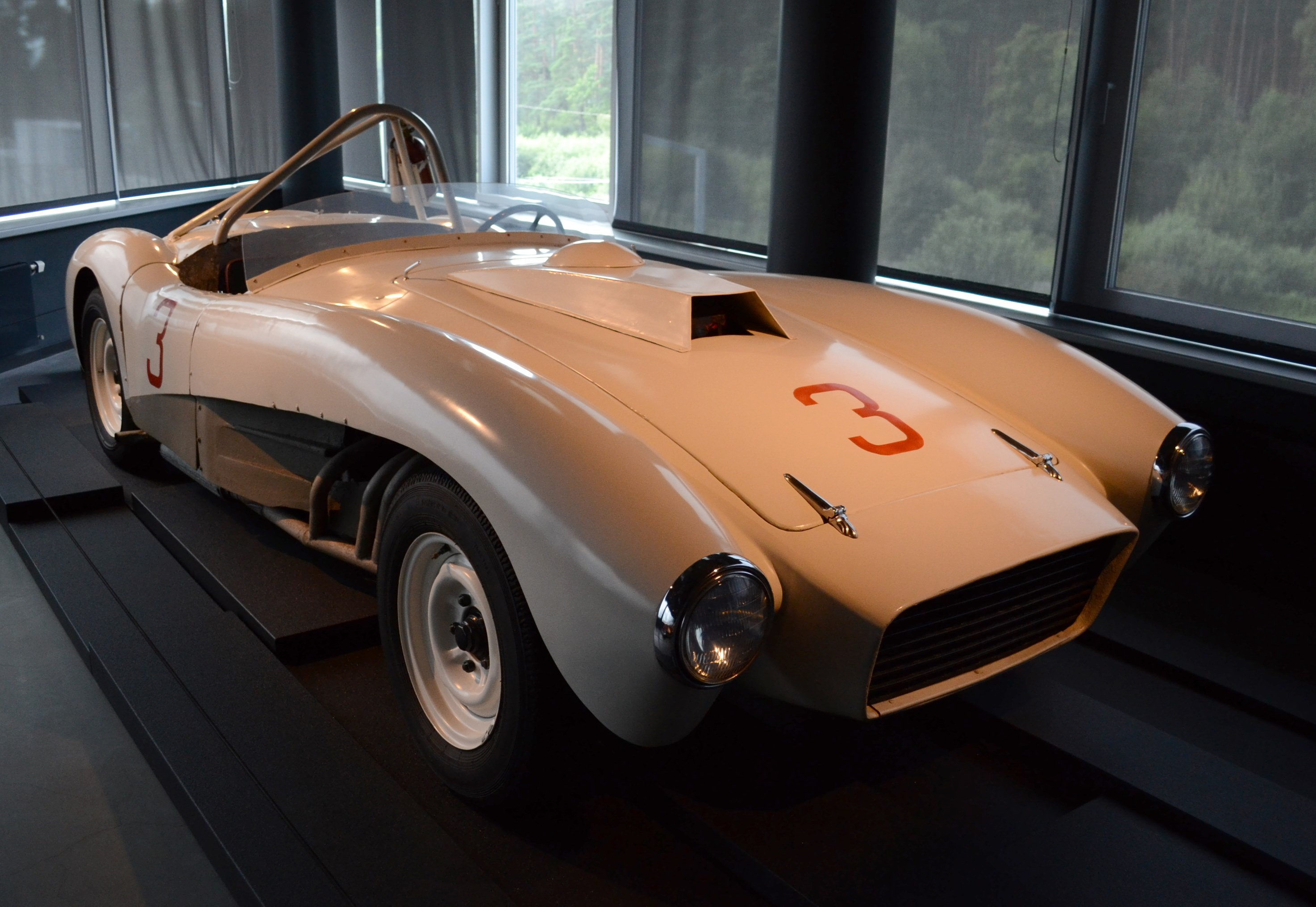
ZIL-112 Sports

- ZIS-101 Sport (1939)
- ZIS-112/1 (1951, based on ZIS-110)
- ZIS-112/2 (1956)
- ZIS-112/3 (1956)
- ZIL-112/4 (1957)
- ZIL-112/5 (1957, lengthened ZIL-112/4)
- ZIL-112 Sports (1961)
- ZIL-412 S (1962)

=== Other vehicles ===
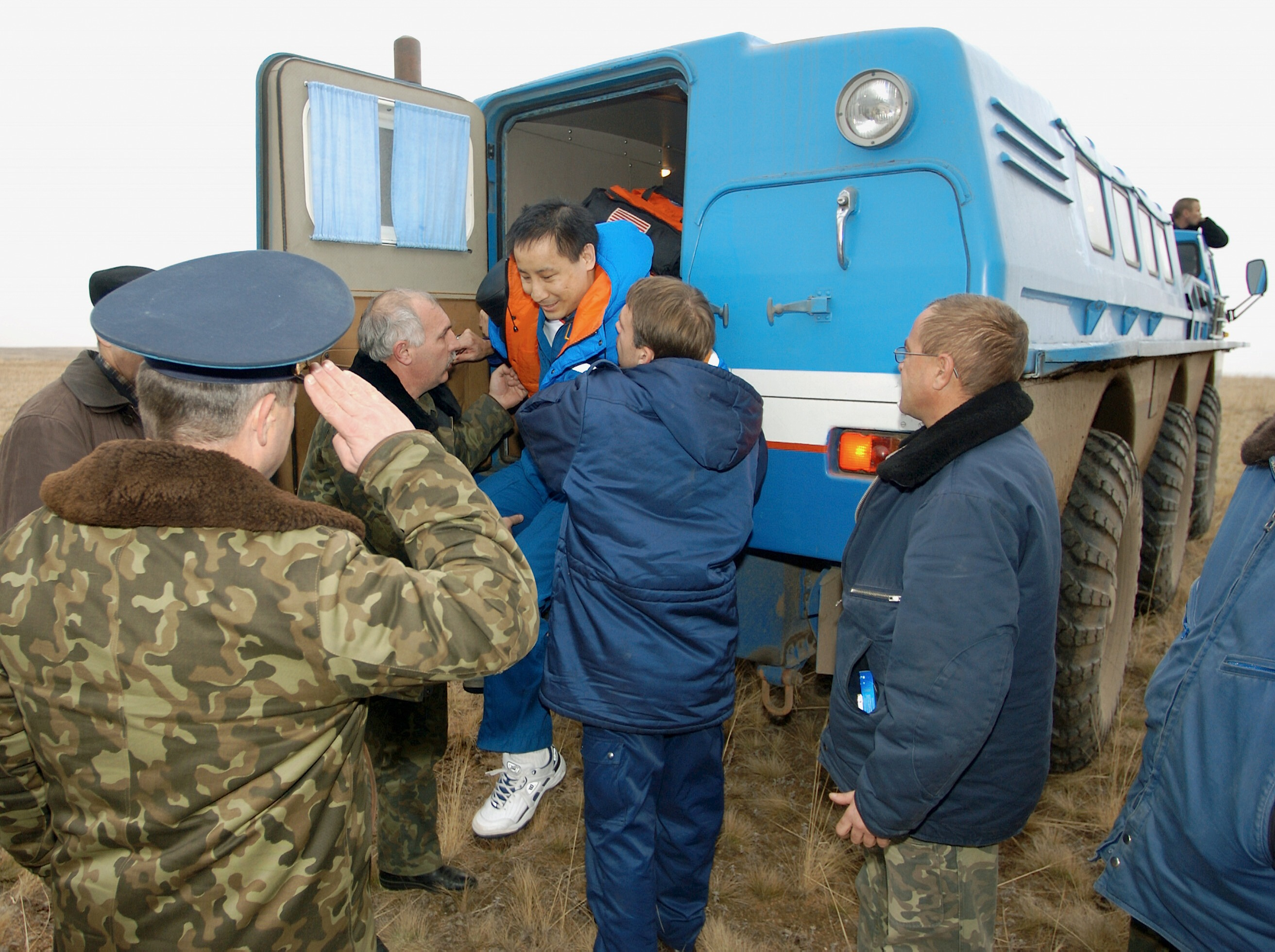
Astronaut Edward T. Lu, having landed with Soyuz TMA-2, is being recovered with a ZIL-49061 vehicle.

- B-3 half-tracked transporter
- ZIS-152 armored personnel carrier
- PES-1 amphibious vehicle (1966)
- ZIL-PKU-1 pneumatic tracked off-road vehicle (1965)
- ZIL-SHN-1 Amphibious Screw Vehicle (1968)
- ZIL-2906 Amphibious Screw Vehicle
- ZIL-4904 Amphibious Screw Vehicle
- ZIL-49042 prototype for "Bluebird" (1973)
- ZIL-4906 (1975?) "Bluebird" 6-wheeled amphibious vehicle, designed to carry the ZIL-2906. Used for the recovery of Soyuz capsules.
- ZIL-49061 (1975-1991) "Bluebird" Amphibious rescue vehicle, passenger version of the ZIL-4906. Used for the recovery of Soyuz crews.
- ZIS-LTA Half-track forest vehicle based on ZIS-5 and KT-12; later versions were based on ZIS-21 and ZIS-150 (1949-1951?)
