= ZIL-4102 =

Overview
- Manufacturer: ZiL
- Production: 1987 and 1990; 3 prototypes
- Assembly: Soviet Union: Moscow

Body and chassis
- Class: Executive car
- Body style: 4-door saloon; 2-door coupe
- Layout: Front-engine, rear-wheel drive
- Related: ZIL-41041

Powertrain
- Engine: 4.5L ZIL V6; 6.0L ZIL V8; Tuned 6.0L ZIL V8; 7.0L ZIL V8 diesel (unbuilt)
- Transmission: 5-speed manual; 4-speed automatic

Chronology
- Successor: None

The ZIL-4102 was a rear-wheel drive saloon developed by the Soviet car manufacturer ZiL (Zavod imeni Lihacheva) in 1987 on the ZIL-41041 platform. The first 4102 prototype was rolled off the production line in 1987 with two more following in 1989 and the final one in late 1990/early 1991. It reportedly had a choice of 3 different power plants (a healthy 4.5L V6, 6.0L V8, and a 7.0L V8 diesel option).

== Background ==
The 4102 (development name океан or ocean) was intended to bring a domestic luxury sports saloon and touring coupe on to the market to compete with the imported Mercedes-Benz W126, Mercedes-Benz W123 (both saloon and coupe) and Audi 100 as well as to produce an executive car for the foreign market (despite the fact that ZIL was mainly building custom limos and saloons for the Soviet Government and its dignitaries).

== Description ==
The 4102 was the first Russian executive car that did not utilized body-on-frame construction, instead it utilized unitized construction. It was also half a meter longer than the GAZ Volga and weighed half a ton less than the ZIL-41041. The roof panels and floor, trunk lid, hood and bumpers were made of fiberglass.

== Performance ==
With its automatic transmission and the 315 hp 7.7 liter V-8 petrol engine, the same as used in other Zil limousines, the 4102 accelerated from 0 to 100 km/h (0 to 62 mph) in 10.5 seconds. Fuel consumption was 18 L/100 km (13 mpg_{‑US}) at 90 km/h (56 mph) and 21 L/100 km (11 mpg_{‑US}) at 120 km/h (75 mph).

== Models and trim levels ==
There were three different models planned: a four-door family saloon, a four-door touring saloon and a two-door touring coupe; all three had very similar standard options (except for the standard engines and transmissions for both the touring coupe and touring saloons). There were two trim levels for all three models.

Base interior trim on the family saloons was composed of an AM/FM radio/tape player, suede seats and head liner, two-way power bench (only the family saloons had benches seats), adjustable rear bench, power windows, power locks, heater and vent fan, power steering, 4.5L V6 engine, and front disc brakes and rear drums (again family saloon only). The second trim level on the family saloon contained most of the features on the base trim but replaced some of them as well leather seats, air conditioning (not a very popular option in Russia but it was offered) and the 6.0L V8.

The touring saloon and coupe's base trim was almost identical to the family saloons except that they offered leather seats, 4-way front bucket seats, 6,000 rpm tachometer, 6.0L V-8, 5-speed manual transmission (standard on the coupe only), and front and rear disc brakes. The second trim level focused mainly on the drive train offering a tuned 6.0L V8 with about 15 more horse power and 24 more ft·lbf of torque and tighter shift ratios for the manual.
