= ZIL-E167 =

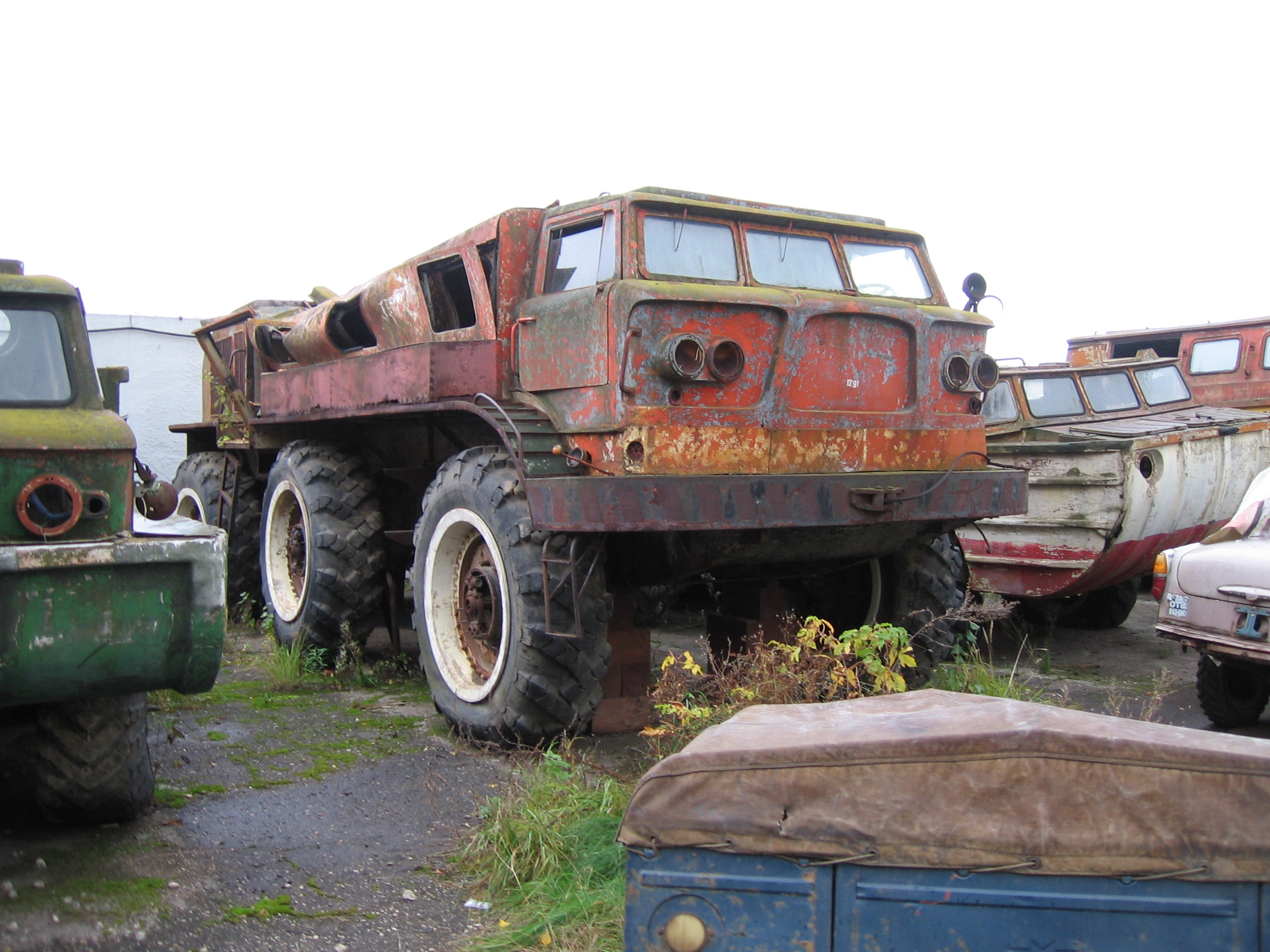

Overview
- Manufacturer: Zavod Imeni Likhacheva
- Production: 1962

Body and chassis
- Class: Truck

Powertrain
- Engine: 7.0L ZIL-375 V8 x2

Dimensions
- Length: 9,260 mm (364.6 in)
- Width: 3,130 mm (123.2 in)
- Height: 3,060 mm (120.5 in)
- Curb weight: 7,000 kg (15,432 lb)

The ZIL-E167 is an off-road truck designed in the beginning of the 1960s to withstand difficult conditions in Siberia, Urals and far east and northern territories of the Soviet Union. It could cross water and control its tire pressure, and was equipped with air cleaning systems as well as a 4.5 kW electric engine to pump water (in case of fire). It also had radio transmission capabilities.

Built on December 31, 1962 and based on a modified ZIL-135 chassis, the ZIL-E167 was fitted with two 7.0-liter V8 engines, both of which were located in the rear of the vehicle. The transmissions were from the ZIL-135L. Both front and rear axles were steerable. Air inlets were situated on the sides of the body. The bottom of the vehicle was protected with metal sheets which were meant to improve the vehicle's sliding characteristics in snow. The cab was shared with the BAZ-135 and the wheels were taken from the MAZ-529E.

When factory testing concluded in March 1965 the Ministry of Defence planned to order two more units, but a second prototype was never built.

Mainly due to the complexity of the transmission, the ZIL-E167 never entered into mass production.

== Specifications ==
- Wheels 6x6
- Engine (2xZIL-375)
- Engine displacement 2x6.96 liters
- Performance 2x180 hp
- Fuel tank capacity 900 liters
- Fuel consumption 100 liters/100 km
- Max speed 65 km/h (on the road fully loaded)
- Max speed in 50/80 cm water 30/20 km/h

== Measures ==
- Length 9260 mm
- Width 3130 mm
- Height 3060 mm
- Ground clearance 750 mm
- Turning radius 11 900 mm
- Wheel diameter 1790 mm

== Weights ==
- Curb weight 7000 kg
- Payload 5000 kg

== Abilities ==
- Ability to go through obstacles:
- Trench 2000 mm
- Vertical wall 1000 mm
- Rise angle 42 degrees
- Fording 1800 mm
- Snow 1000 mm
