= Airoll =

Airoll is a system of vehicle propulsion that attempts to combine the strengths of air filled tires with those of caterpillar tracks to create an all-terrain amphibious vehicle while maintaining a reasonable speed and payload capacity. First conceived in the 18th century, the concept was still a novelty in the mid 20th century, which saw rapid development of the idea into practical vehicles by the United States, the Soviet Union, and multiple civilian enterprises. The most notable of these vehicles is perhaps the XM769 Marginal Terrain Vehicle, which is on display at the Marine Corps Mechanized Museum at Camp Pendleton, California.

== Etymology ==
Airoll is likely a combination of the words "Air" and "Roll", concisely describing the principle in which air filled tires are linked together and used to 'roll' a vehicle over any surface. The first instance of the term "Airoll" being used to describe a vehicle is in a November 1960 test report on the 1960 BorgWarner test platform. This prototype was also the first known vehicle to ever be built using this method of propulsion. The name continued to be used by U.S Army, U.S Marine Corps and U.S Navy personnel throughout the concept's military lifetime and into the digital era. The term "Airoll" entered public lexicon when it was used in the January 1963 edition of Popular Science.

== History ==
=== Early Concepts ===
The first records of this concept dates back to the 18th century; in 1713 Mr M.D'Hermand presented the idea in Memoir No. 142 at the Academy of Sciences, France. In this document he describes an "Endless Roller Truck" in which rollers below the vehicle are "...each furnished with pivots or gudgeons in their centers and connected to each other by straps". The rollers were to "turn easily on their pivots, and as the load is drawn forward they circulate easily around the lower platform".

=== Patent Applications (1950s) ===
The next known mention of this concept came in an April 1952 Patent Application USA 2,734,476, R.O.Marsh Jr., "Belt Connected Roller Arrangements For Forming Vehicle Tracks and Other Purposes", issued Feb 14 1956. In this patent Marsh outlines his concept to “provide vehicle body or frame structures with endless tread arrangements comprising a continuous series of spaced-apart rollers connected to form a continuous track”. Marsh emphasises the “highly desirable” nature of this device when trying to move a vehicle over “bogs, marshes or submerged areas where the usual form of wheeled vehicles would be inoperative”. Marsh suggested that these drums be standard 55-gallon steel drums or barrels, as commonly used for oil. According to Marsh this would have the added benefit of allowing the vehicle to transport barrels of fluid across waterways as long as the fluid itself was less dense than water.

A 1955 Patent Application USA 2,916,006, L.Crandall, "Amphibian Vehicle", issued Dec 8 1959, contains a more refined version of Marsh's design, featuring a compact, amphibious personal vehicle utilising this concept. Unlike Marsh, Crandall advocated specialised toroidal tires, through which an axle could be mounted and fixed on either side to the track mechanism, rather than being bound to each other.

=== First Prototypes (1960-1964) ===
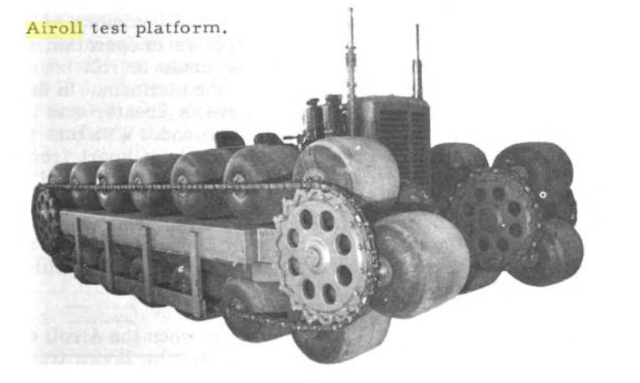
The 1960 BorgWarner Test Vehicle

As early as 1958 the US Office Of Naval Research had begun research on the military applications of the Airoll concept and by April 1960 the Ingersoll-Kalamazoo Division of the Borg-Warner Corporation had developed a prototype test vehicle in conjunction with the US Military. Throughout 1960 and 1961 they tested the vehicle in different ground conditions using 3 distinct tire configurations: The first used 16 24”x24”x6” Goodyear ‘Terra Tires’ per track, the second used 19 smaller ‘Terra Tires’ per track, and the third configuration used 32 standard industrial tires per track, 2 tires per axle. These tests seem to have been largely a success

The Airoll principle of locomotion was successfully demonstrated and can provide future vehicles with additional mobility potential if properly exploited. Fundamental to all its possible uses is the underlying advantage that ensures optimum mobility during all operating conditions. A high rate of speed is possible over improved roads and the extent of off-road operations exceeds that of any other known vehicle. Its inherent buoyancy makes it adaptable to bog-lands, snow, sand and mud.

— "Airoll Vehicle Locomotion Study", U.S Government Research Reports, Volume 36, Issue 8 (9th August 1961)

The vehicle weighed between 17,500 lb and 19,100 lb when the 16 tire tracks were mounted. The vehicle was powered by an engine outputting 185 bhp at 2,800rpm. The January 1963 edition of Popular Science Magazine contained an article on the prototype.

By 1961 Ling-Temco-Vought had built and successfully tested a scaled test bed of what was to become the Plenum Air Tread Amphibian (PATA), in which large air cushions were attached to the outside of a conventional track to provide mobility and buoyancy, giving further credibility to the Airoll concept despite not technically being an Airoll vehicle itself.

In 1963 aircraft manufacturer Canadair unveiled their own Airoll prototype, model number CL-213 'Fisher'. This vehicle bore a strong resemblance to the 1959 Crandall Patent. This too was published in Popular Science, in the December 1964 Edition. The article claimed Fisher could propel itself at 10 mph on hard ground, 5 mph in mud and snow, and 3 mph in water.

=== Advanced Prototypes (1965) ===
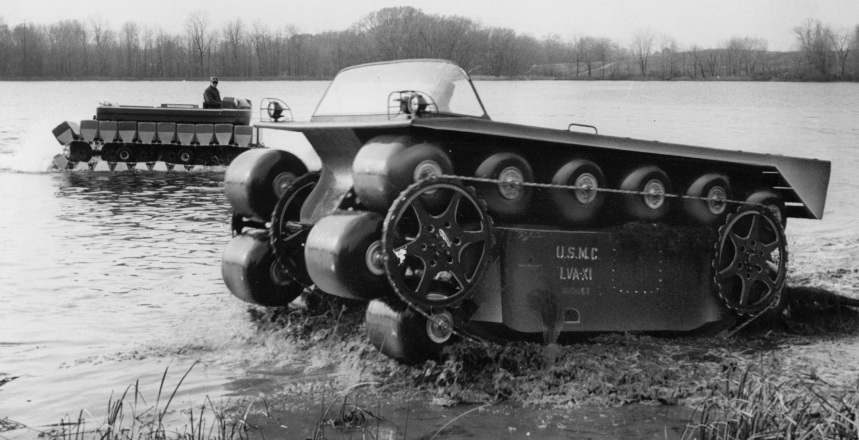
‘LVA-X1’ was the US Marine Corps Prototype Airoll vehicle, unveiled in 1965

In 1965 two very similar prototypes were unveiled. One developed in the USA - the second BorgWarner prototype, named “Airoll 1”. Airoll 1 was a refined version of the original BorgWarner test vehicle made for the U.S Marine Corps. It was narrower, shorter, and had a smaller automotive engine of 80 bhp with 13 tires per track, weighing less than a third of that of the test vehicle, at 5900 lb (2680 kg). However this prototype was a practical vehicle and featured a cargo compartment, access ramp, mud guards, position lights, headlights and a windshield. Known to the USMC as the LVA-X1, this vehicle was claimed to have a cargo capacity of over half a ton.

The other Airoll prototype was developed in the USSR by the Russian heavy vehicle and car manufacturer ZiL, known as the PKU-1 (Sometimes referred to as the PKT-1 or PCC-1). Little information is readily available about this vehicle despite ample photographic and even video resources. Notably, ZiL also manufactured the ZIL-29061, arguably the most successful example of a screw propelled vehicle.

=== XM759 Marginal Terrain Vehicle (1966) ===
XM759 Marginal Terrain Vehicle
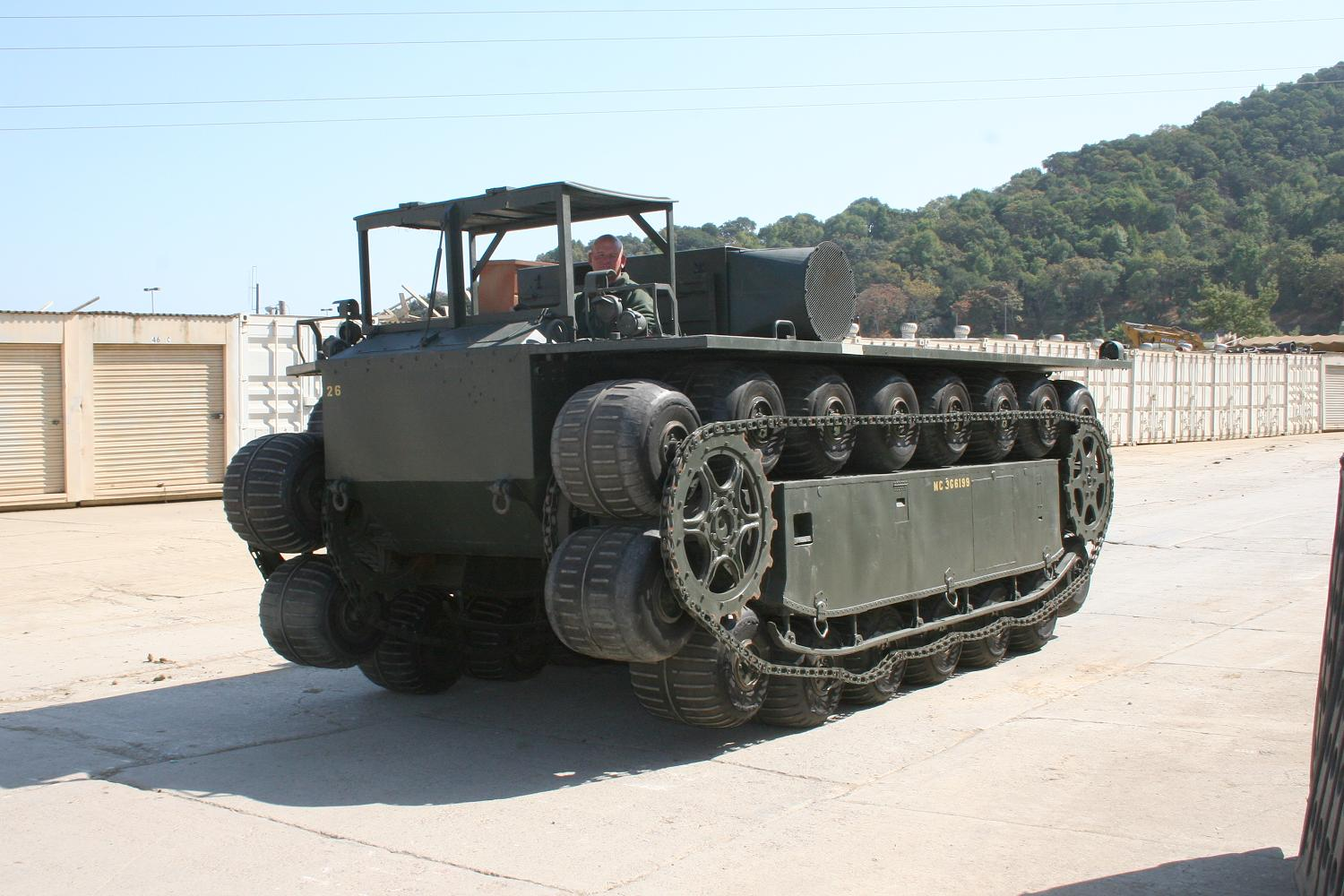
- Type: Amphibious vehicle
- Place of origin: United States

Service history
- Used by: United States Marine Corps (R&D vehicle)

Production history
- Designer: BorgWarner
- No. built: 7

Specifications
- Mass: 6350kg (14000lb)
- Length: 6.2m (20ft)
- Width: 2.8m (9.2ft)
- Height: 2.2m (7.2ft)
- Crew: 1 Driver, 1 Assistant Driver, up to 14 passengers
- Armor: None
- Engine: Chevrolet 283 V8
- Maximum speed: 25 mph (roads); 7 mph (water)

By 1965 the US Military was fully engaged in the Vietnam War. The U.S Army and Marine Corps both were impressed with the performance of the BorgWarner vehicles and saw them as a potential replacement for the M76 Otter and M116 Husky in the jungles and swamps of Vietnam. In May 1965 the Marine Corps XM759 development program was initiated by the United States Army Tank-automotive and Armaments Command (TACOM). The first phase of the program used data from previous Airoll tests to establish the vehicle configuration which would best meet the military's requirements. These requirements included a payload capacity of 3000 lb, space for 14 troops or two 44”x52” cargo pallets, to be able to travel at 25 mph on land and 7 mph in water, and be able to remain mobile on a 60% gradient incline. The vehicle was to be transported by rail, sea and air (by C-130 or VTOL) and include a number of features including bilge pumps and foldaway seating.

In September 1965 the Marine Corps approved a TACOM configuration which met these requirements and ordered 7 pilot vehicles for testing. The XM769 was originally intended to have a unique powertrain using a hydro-mechanic transmission, but due to the urgent need for amphibious vehicles in Vietnam, the development program was split into two. One program would follow the original plan, developing a custom powertrain that would best suit the vehicle over the standard 36-month research and development timeline. The other program would use the existing powertrain of the M116 “Husky” Cargo Carrier, in order to speed up the production of test vehicles and would follow an accelerated 12 month timeline. All test vehicles ordered used the M116 powertrain.

Testing of the vehicle was conducted from October 1966 to July 1967 in various environments to determine if the vehicle would be suitable for USMC use in the jungles of Vietnam. Extreme effort was made to ensure that the environment the vehicles were tested in accurately simulated the hostile environment of the Mekong river delta.

During this test evaluation the XM759 was tested alongside the existing M116 amphibian. The XM759 was found to have superior mobility and vastly superior off-road capability when compared to the M116, especially when operating in extremely fine soil conditions which would immobilize the conventionally tracked M116. The Marine Corps was very impressed with the vehicle during testing and saw great potential in the Airoll concept - in a 1971 congressional hearing, General Herman Poggemeyer was asked of the MTV's capabilities and replied: “Our tests have indicated that it is almost unstoppable. It is a very fine vehicle.”

However, issues with the vehicle had become apparent during the extensive testing in 1966 and 1967. The smooth tires were prone to slipping on wet grassy banks when exiting the water, the tires would very quickly wear down the bottom of the sponsons, and the chains would deform and stretch under load. These problems were quickly remedied by the USMC engineers by adding chevron treads to the tires, reinforcing the bottom of the sponsons, and using heavy duty chain. A much more concerning problem was the buildup of thick mud and vegetation in the top of the sponson, significantly increasing load on the track, stressing the wheel axles and in some cases causing the hull to buckle under the tension. Notably this problem only occurred in one test location, in May 1967 at Camp Wallace - it was only in a specific combination of soil and vegetation conditions that this issue became apparent but it would eventually doom the entire Airoll program.

By the time the XM769 test vehicles had been rebuilt with features that alleviated the problems encountered during testing the Marine Corps had already withdrawn funding from the program and used this money to buy the existing and satisfactory M116 Cargo Carriers along with modification kits and sent these to Vietnam instead, giving the Marines an interim amphibian. Soon after, the US began their withdrawal from Vietnam, eliminating the need for a Marginal Terrain Vehicle such as the XM769 and thus shelving the project in 1971.

=== Modern Examples (1966 - Present) ===
After the cancellation of the XM759 project in 1971 there has been no known government interest in airoll vehicles - the DARPA Captive Air Amphibious Transporter project is a modern example of a tracked amphibian but uses air filled pontoons attached onto the outside of a conventional track.

== Engineering ==
The Airoll concept of locomotion works by combining two modes of operation - “Rolling Wheel Track Action” and “Stationary Wheel Track Action”. These both have advantages and disadvantages but the very nature of Airoll vehicles means that they can utilise both.

=== Track Action ===
Rolling Wheel Track Action

This occurs when the vehicle is operating on a level or a slightly sloping surface and is unique to an airoll vehicle. The tires/rollers are made to roll beneath the sponson by the tangential force being applied by the sponson as it moves forward. The friction force between the sponson and the tires is greater than the rolling resistance between the tires and the ground. Each tire rotates separately, allowing the vehicle to get pulled along like a conventionally tracked vehicle while also being rolled forwards by the tires. For every full rotation of a tire, the vehicle moves a distance equal to twice the circumference of the tire. This means that the vehicle has increased speed and mobility whenever on relatively hard flat ground as it is both being pulled forward and rolling over the tires beneath it.

Stationary Wheel Track Action

Is that of a conventional tracked vehicle and will occur when the vehicle is going up a steep incline or attempting to move across a soft surface that causes the tires to sink into the ground. The force exerted on the tires by the sponson renders them immobile and means they cannot spin on their axis. The tires of the vehicle are carried forward by movement of the chain around the sprocket, reach the ground, sink into the ground and remain in contact with the ground and stationary while the vehicle moves forward and over them.

=== Advantages ===
- The airoll's ability to utilise rolling wheel track action allows it to move quickly over relatively firm ground and navigate shallow slopes at speed.
- The tires of the airoll can be used to replace a traditional suspension system - the pneumatic action of the tires under the sponsons can cushion and support the vehicle without extra equipment.
- Airoll vehicles are very easy to make into amphibians due to the buoyancy given to them by the air inside their tires.
- Like other tracked vehicles, airolls can turn in place by making the tracks turn in opposite directions.
- The tires serve as paddles as the track rotates allowing the airoll to propel itself and even maneuver in water without the aid of a propeller.
- It is common for the tracks of conventionally tracked vehicles to be fitted with rubber pads in order to alleviate the damage they cause to the surfaces they move over. Using air filled tires, an airoll has no such issue and can drive on highways with no modifications.
- Airolls have superb off-road capability due to the combination of incredibly low ground pressure, high buoyancy, high traction and their ability to “paddle” through soft surfaces.
- The deep ruts the tires create allow the airoll to navigate slopes of up to 60% gradient without difficulty.

=== Disadvantages ===
- The ride quality of an airoll is poor due to the lack of suspension.
- The vehicle can “throw” a track and become immobilized relatively easily due to the track only being attached with an outer chain. Conventionally tracked vehicles have the entire track link engaging the sprocket wheel at both ends.
- When navigating marshes or similar it is common for vegetation to get dragged into the track mechanism, often immobilizing the vehicle.
- Air filled tires are prone to being punctured or torn. This is especially a concern in combat situations - most combat vehicles have solid metal or rubber tracks or tires.
- Low top speed when compared to most other vehicles - at high speeds the tires are prone to slippage.
- Incredibly high wear on track components as well as on the bottom of the vehicle that the tires come into contact with. The wheel axles of some airolls have been shown to experience very high wear, but some airoll vehicles do not use wheel axles.
