= Claude-François-Dorothée, marquis de Jouffroy d'Abbans =

French naval architect and engineer (1751–1832)

Claude-François-Dorothée Jouffroy d'Abbans
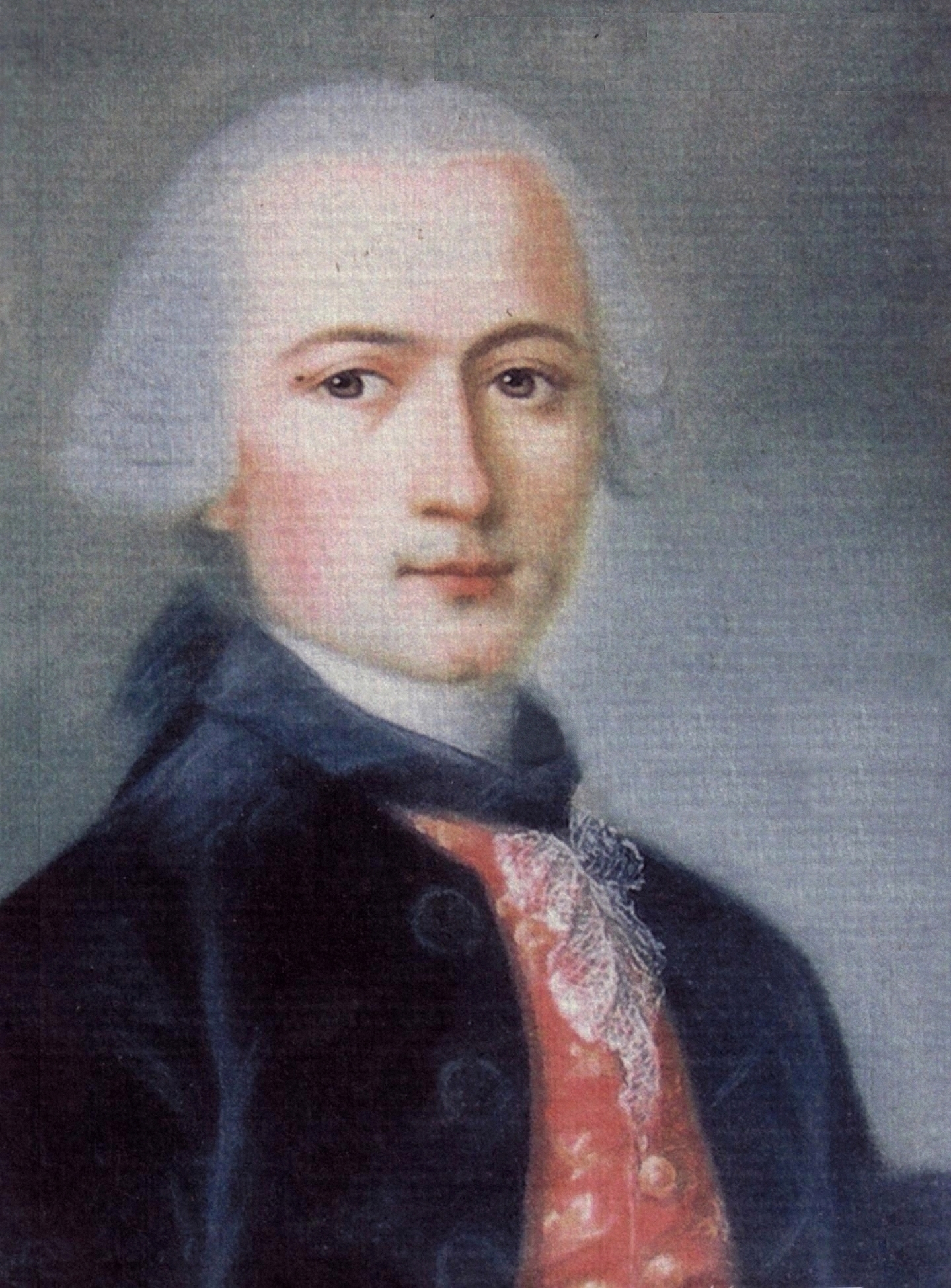
- Born: September 30, 1751; Roches-sur-Rognon, Champagne, France
- Died: July 18, 1832 (aged 80); Paris, France
- Known for: Inventor of the first steamboat

Claude-François-Dorothée, marquis de Jouffroy d'Abbans (30 September 1751 - 18 July 1832) was a French naval architect and engineer. He was the inventor of the first steamboat.

== Career ==
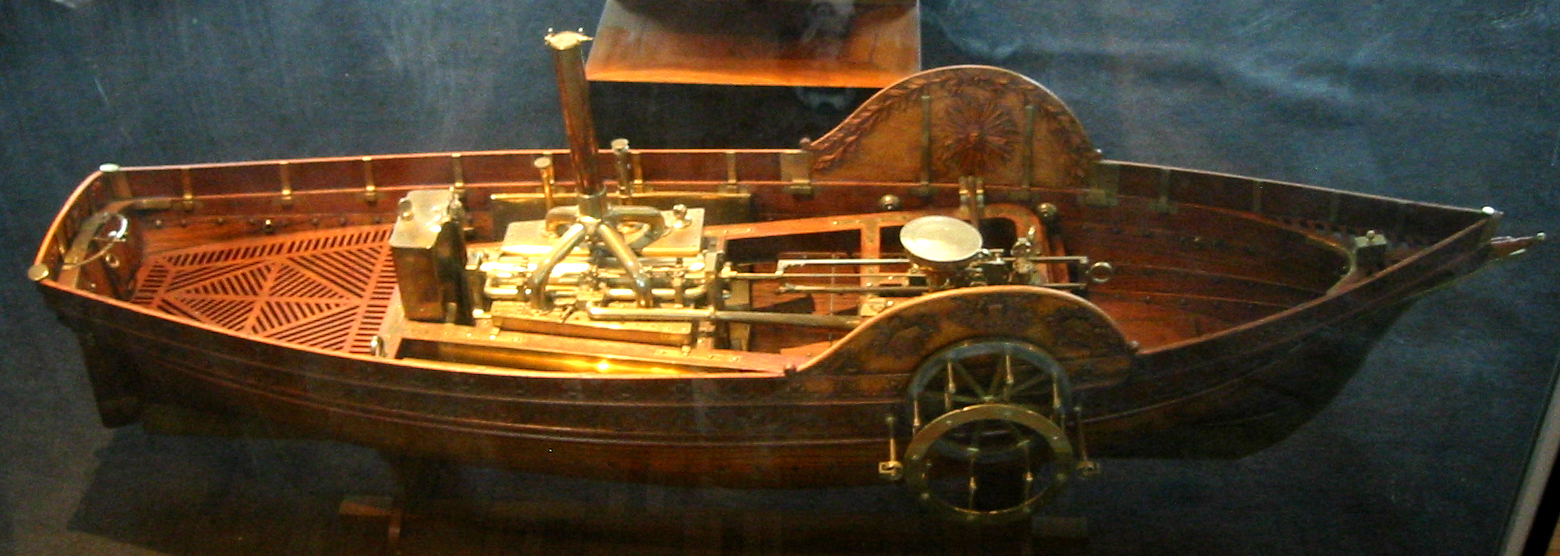
Model of steamboat Pyroscaphe, built in 1784 by Jouffroy d'Abbans, to convince Périer of his invention

In 1773, Jouffroy d'Abbans met with the Périer brothers and studied in their workshop the Pompe à feu (Fire pump), which had been used as a motive force for the hydraulic machine developed by Chaillot, in order to apply it to ship propulsion.

In 1776, Jouffroy d'Abbans developed a 13-meter steamboat, the Palmipède, in which the engine moved oars equipped with rotating blades. The boat was tested on the Doubs in June and July 1776.

In 1783, he made a paddle steamer named the Pyroscaphe ply on the Saône. However, the Académie des Sciences prohibited him from using his invention in Paris, and instead nominated Périer, one of de Jouffroy d'Abbans' opponents whose previous attempts had failed, to inspect the project. Further misfortunes due to the French Revolution hindered his progress. His claim was acknowledged by Arago and in 1840 by the French Academy. Jouffroy published Les bateaux à vapeur and wrote for the academy Mémoires sur les pompes à feu. Impoverished, he retired to the Hôtel des Invalides and died there of cholera.

In 1803, more than 20 years after Jouffroy d'Abbans' inaugural trip, Robert Fulton would succeed in sailing a steamship of his conception on the Seine.

== Personal life ==
Claude-François-Dorothée de Jouffroy d'Abbans was born on September 30, 1751, in Roches-sur-Rognon, Champagne. He died in Paris on July 18, 1832.

The Marquis de Jouffroy d'Abbans was held prisoner on the "Royal Fort of Saint Margaret Island", a prison island in France, from 1772 to 1773, following a romantic rivalry with the Count of Artois. It is said that he conceived of his steam-powered Pyroscaphe after seeing galleys manoeuvring in front of the island.
