= Screw propulsion =

Screw propulsion may refer to:

- Propeller (marine) propulsion of water vehicles
- Screw-propelled vehicle on land
