= Palmipède =

1774 steam-powered vessel

The Palmipède (from French, meaning 'web-footed') was an early steamboat created in 1774 by French nobleman, engineer, and inventor Marquis Claude de Jouffroy. It was tested in June and July 1776 on the Doubs River between Besançon and Montbéliard, making it the first steam-powered vessel.

The 13 m (43 ft) long boat was powered by a Newcomen engine that drove oars with hinged flaps, designed to mimic the webbed feet of waterfowl. It was deemed unsuccessful due to its slower-than-expected speed.

Jouffroy followed this in 1783 with his Pyroscaphe, the first paddle steamer.
