= Pyroscaphe =

1783 French experimental steamship

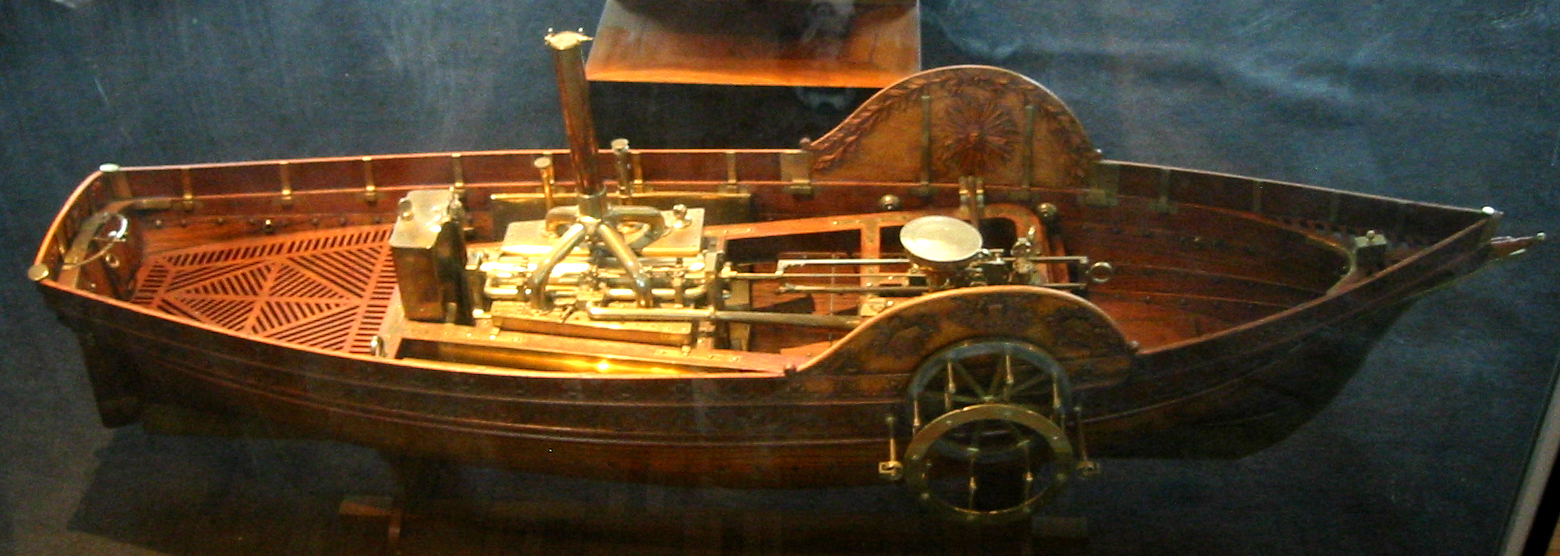
Scale model made by de Jouffroy in 1784 to show the French Science Academy the engine and paddle wheels used on the Pyroscaphe. The model is now in the National Maritime Museum in Paris.

Pyroscaphe was an early experimental steamship built by Marquis de Jouffroy d'Abbans in 1783. The first demonstration took place on 15 July 1783 on the river Saône in France. After the first demonstration, it was said that the hull had opened up and the boiler was letting out steam, faults common in early steamboats. In this case, it seems to have been easily repaired as the boat was said to have made several trips up and down the river. A month later, on 19 August, the boat carried several passengers who signed a witness protocol for a successful journey.

The Pyroscaphe was propelled by a double-acting steam engine and sidewheels, and was therefore a paddle steamer.

Little is known about the design of Pyroscaphe, although models and simple line drawings survive. The line drawings are also significantly different to the model, which appears to be a prototype for a third vessel. Unlike his earlier Palmipède, Pyroscaphe used a rotating paddle wheel, rather than oscillating oars or paddles. The steam engine had also developed from a Newcomen atmospheric engine with a rocking beam, to what appears to be a high pressure engine (such as Richard Trevithick was known for.) with a horizontal cylinder. This cylinder had a small diameter and a long stroke, and used two rack and pinion mechanisms with ratchet teeth to rotate the paddle wheel.

== Specifications ==
(These figures are somewhat dubious, see Talk:Pyroscaphe.)

- Length: 13 m/ 42ft 7 in
- Beam: 4,5 m/14 ft 10 in
- Displacement: 163t
- Complement: 3

== See also ==
- Palmipède, his 1774 paddle steamer
