= ZIL-PKU-1 =

- Type: Amphibious Vehicle (Airoll)
- Place of origin: Soviet Union

Production history
- Designer: ZiL Design Office (B. A. Grachev)
- Manufacturer: ZiL
- No. built: unknown (R&D use)

Specifications
- Payload capacity: 1500 kg
- Operational range: 50-60 km (practical range) (Note: After 50-60km the vehicle's caterpillar tracks and wheels had collected enough ground debris (like grass etc.), that it was imperative to clear the tracks.)
- Maximum speed: 18 km/h (Note: The vehicle's maximum speed when at full payload capacity of 1,5 tons.)

The ZIL-PKU-1 (ru: ЗИЛ ПКУ-1), also known as ZIL-PTKS-1, was a soviet Airoll combining pneumatic tires and continuous tracks, creating an all-terrain amphibious vehicle with the aim of traversing difficult terrain, as well as achieving great buoyancy. The first prototype was developed in 1965 by the ZiL Design Office under the direction of B. A. Grachev.
