= Roches-Bettaincourt =

- Commune
- Location of Roches-Bettaincourt
- Location within France Location within Grand Est
- Coordinates: 48°18′24″N 5°15′06″E
- Country: France
- Region: Grand Est
- Department: Haute-Marne
- Arrondissement: Saint-Dizier
- Canton: Bologne
- Intercommunality: CC Meuse Rognon

Government
  - Mayor (2020–2026): Laurent Hasselberger
- Area^{1}: 41.38 km^{2} (15.98 sq mi)
- Elevation: 227 m (745 ft)
- Highest elevation: 389 m (1,276 ft)
- Lowest elevation: 220 m (720 ft)
- Population (2023): 521
  - Density: 12.6/km^{2} (32.6/sq mi)
- Time zone: UTC+01:00 (CET)
  - Summer (DST): UTC+02:00 (CEST)
- INSEE/Postal code: 52044 /52270
- ^{1} French Land Register data, which excludes lakes, ponds, glaciers > 1 km^{2} (0.386 sq mi or 247 acres) and river estuaries.

Roches-Bettaincourt (French pronunciation: [ʁɔʃ bɛtɛ̃kuʁ]) is a commune in the Haute-Marne department in north-eastern France.

== See also ==
- Communes of the Haute-Marne department
