= ZIL-2906 =

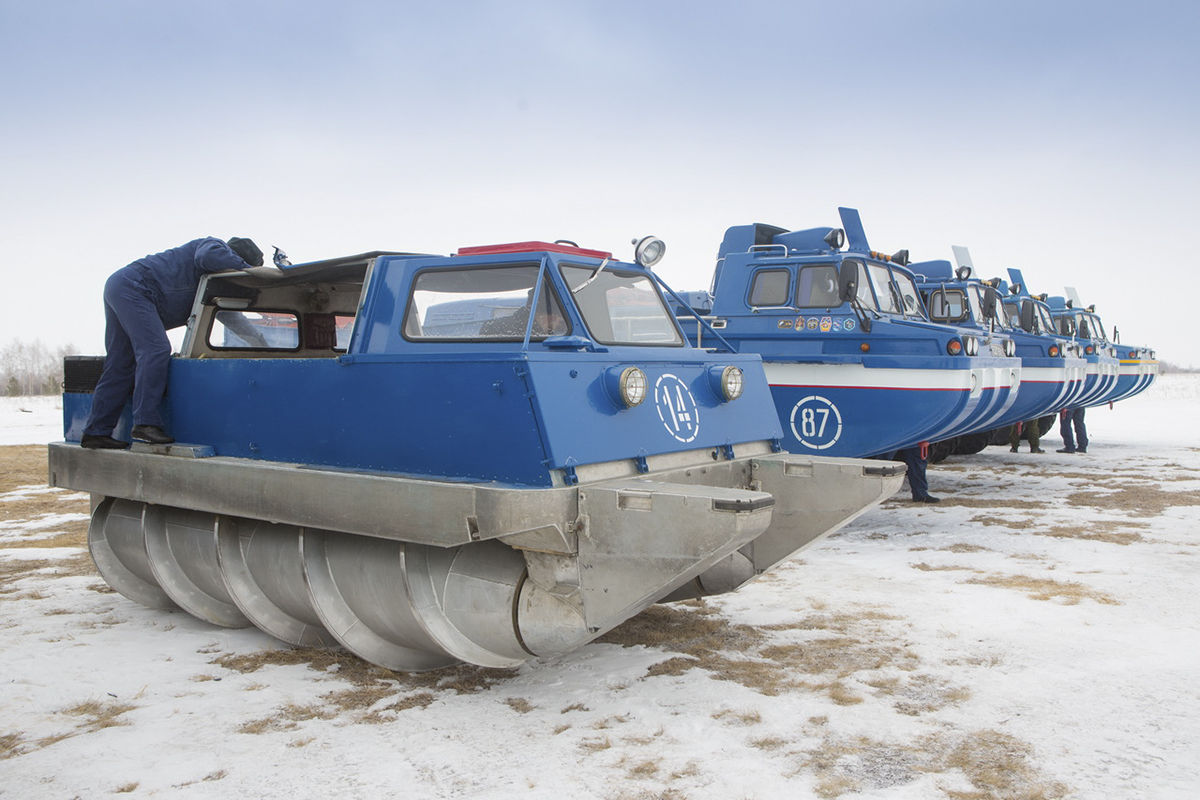
- ZIL-29061, updated model of 2906

Overview
- Manufacturer: ZiL
- Also called: ЗИЛ-2906
- Production: 2906: 1975 – 1979; 29061: 1980 – 1991

Body and chassis
- Class: amphibious craft
- Related: ZIL-4906

Powertrain
- Engine: МеМЗ-967А

The ZIL-2906 (Russian: ЗИЛ-2906) is a screw-driven amphibious craft manufactured in Soviet Union from 1975 to 1979 by ZiL. The ZIL-2906 was produced from July 1975 to 1979, five manufactured in total. In 1980, it was succeeded by the ZIL-29061, produced until 1991.

These vehicles are notable for being Screw-propelled vehicles (in Russian: шнекохо́д), allowing it to traverse inhospitable terrains. The vehicle was designed to recover re-entered Soyuz space capsules from difficult terrain. It was equipped with heaters for the front seats, transponder and radio and stretchers.

The ZIL-2906 was carried on the back of a ZIL-4906 "Bluebird" (which had a top speed of 80 kilometres per hour (50 mph)) until it reached terrain impassable for the latter. At this point the ZIL-2906 would be unloaded and resume the search. Dismounting from the Bluebird took about half an hour.

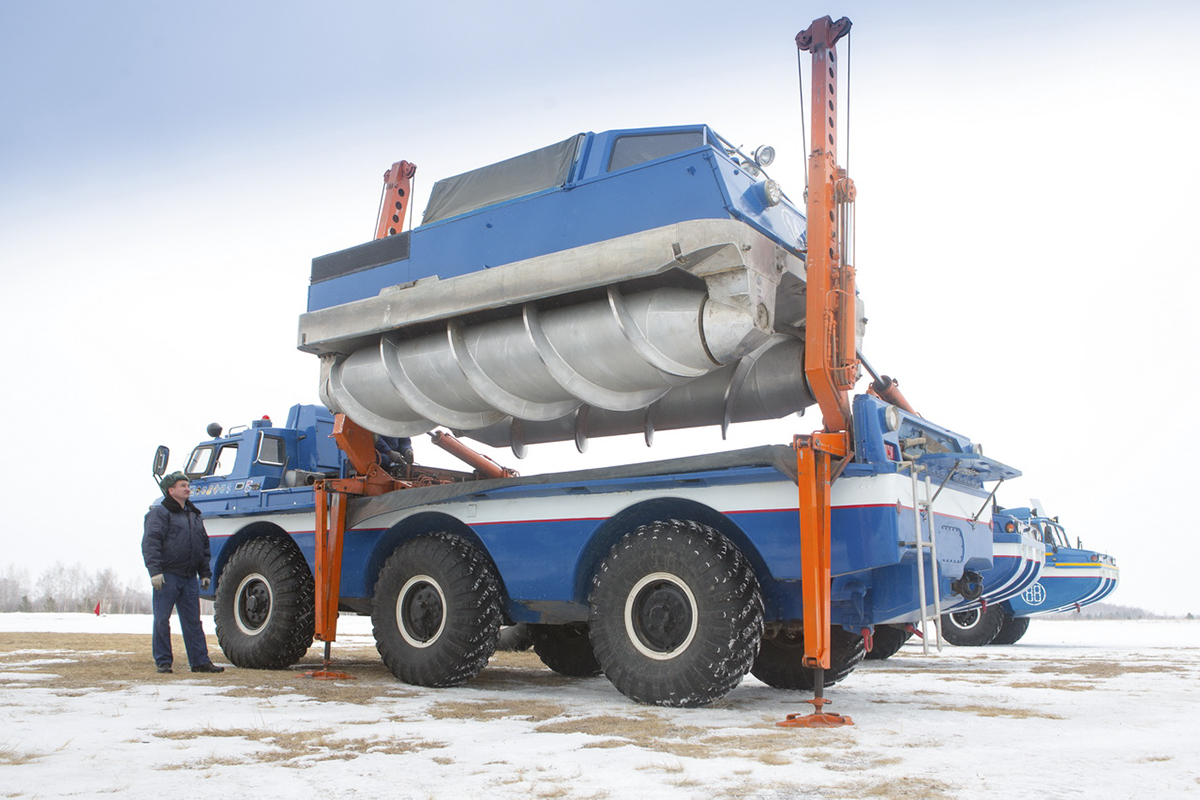
Russian troops exercise the offloading of a ZIL-29061 from a ZIL-4906

== Specifications ==
Mass

- 2,000 kilograms (4,400 lb; 2.0 t)

Maximum speed

- Water - 16 kilometres per hour (9.9 mph) (8.6 kn)
- Swamp - 20 kilometres per hour (12 mph) (11 kn)
- Snow - 45 kilometres per hour (28 mph) (24 kn)

Dimensions

- Length - 4,900 millimetres (190 in)
- Width - 2,400 millimetres (94 in)
- Height - 2,200 millimetres (87 in)
