= Screw-propelled vehicle =

Vehicle propelled by load-bearing rotating helical flanges

A screw-propelled vehicle

A screw-propelled vehicle is a land or amphibious vehicle designed to traverse difficult terrain, such as snow, ice, mud, and swamp. Such vehicles are distinguished by being moved by the rotation of one or more auger-like cylinders fitted with a helical flange that engages with the medium through or over which the vehicle is moving. They have been called Archimedes screw vehicles by the US military, where they are classified as a type of marginal terrain vehicle (MTV). Modern vehicles called Amphirols and other similar vehicles have specialised uses.

The weight of the vehicle is typically borne by one or more pairs of large flanged cylinders; sometimes a single flanged cylinder is used with additional stabilising skis. These cylinders each have a helical spiral flange like the thread of a screw. On each matched pair of cylinders, one will have its flange running clockwise and the other counter-clockwise. The flange engages with the surface on which the vehicle rests. Ideally this should be slightly soft material such as snow, sand or mud so that the flange can get a good bite. An engine is used to counter-rotate the cylinders — one cylinder turns clockwise and the other counter-clockwise. The counter-rotations cancel out so that the vehicle moves forwards (or backwards) along the axis of rotation.

The principle of the operation is the inverse of the screw conveyor. A screw conveyor uses a helical screw to move semi-solid materials horizontally or at a slight incline; in a screw propelled vehicle, the semi-solid substrate remains stationary and the machine itself moves.

== Early developments ==
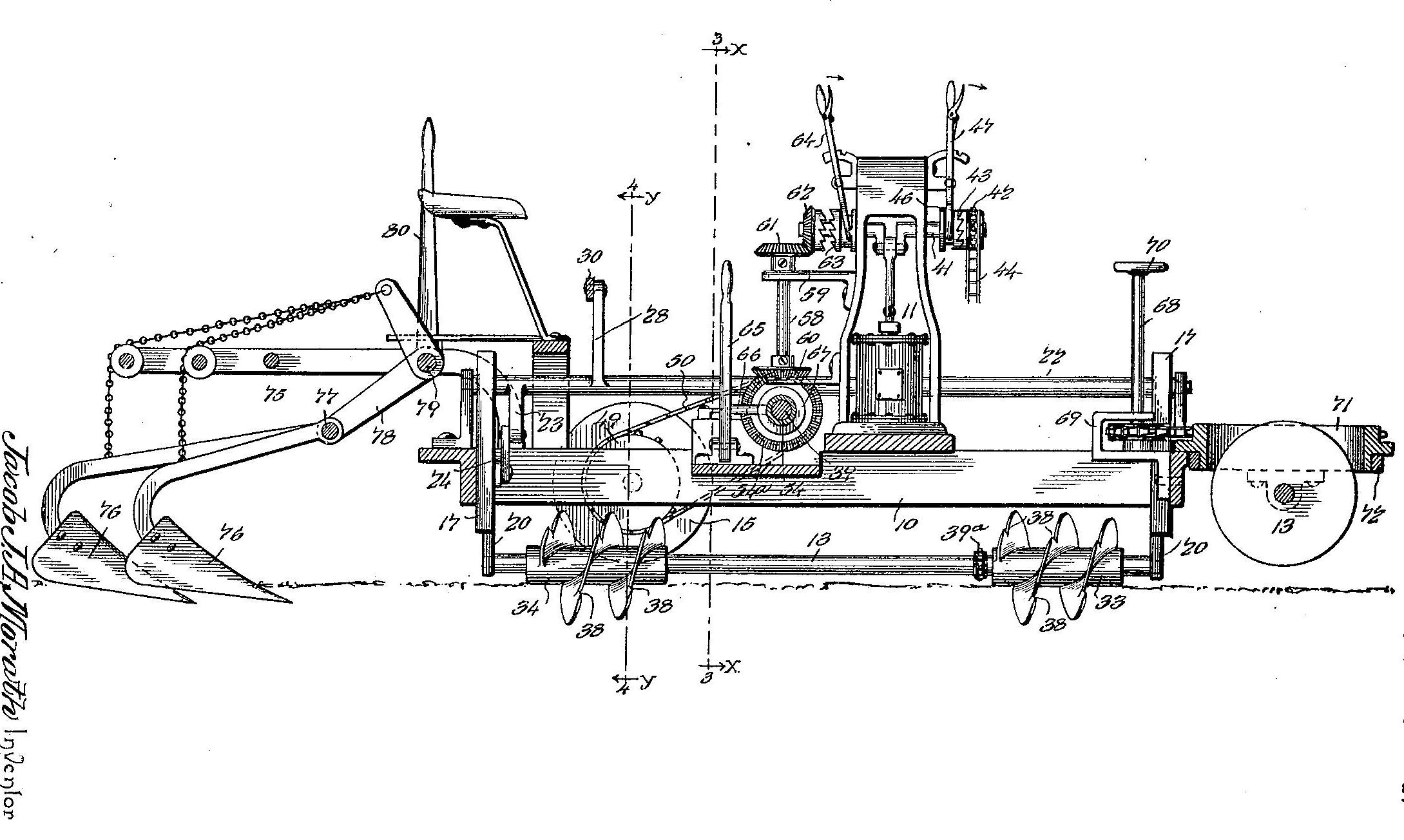
Jacob Morath's design for an auger driven agricultural machine, 1899.

One of the earliest examples of a screw-propelled vehicle was designed by Jacob Morath, a native of Switzerland who settled in St. Louis, Missouri in the United States in 1868. Morath's machine was designed for agricultural work such as hauling a plough. The augers were designed with cutting edges so that they would break up roots in the ground as the machine moved.

One of the first screw-propelled vehicles that was actually built was designed by James and Ira Peavey of Maine. It was patented by Ira Peavey in 1907; the Peavey family has been famous for its contributions to the lumber industry ever since blacksmith Joseph Peavey of Stillwater, Maine, invented the tool known to this day as a Peavey (sometimes "pevy" or "pivie"). The Peavey Manufacturing Co. is still located in Maine.

The Peaveys' machine had two pairs of cylinders with an articulation between the pairs to effect steering. At least two prototype vehicles were constructed: one was steam powered the other used a petrol engine. The prototypes worked well on hard packed snow but failed in soft powder because the flanges had nothing to grip into. The machine was designed to haul logs, but its length and rigid construction meant that it had difficulty with the uneven winter roads for which it was intended. Peavey's invention could not compete with the Lombard Steam Log Hauler built by Alvin Lombard and it was not produced commercially. (The Lombard vehicle was an early example of a half-track vehicle, it resembled a railway locomotive with a sled or wheels in front for steering and caterpillar tracks for traction.)

== Armstead Snow Motor ==
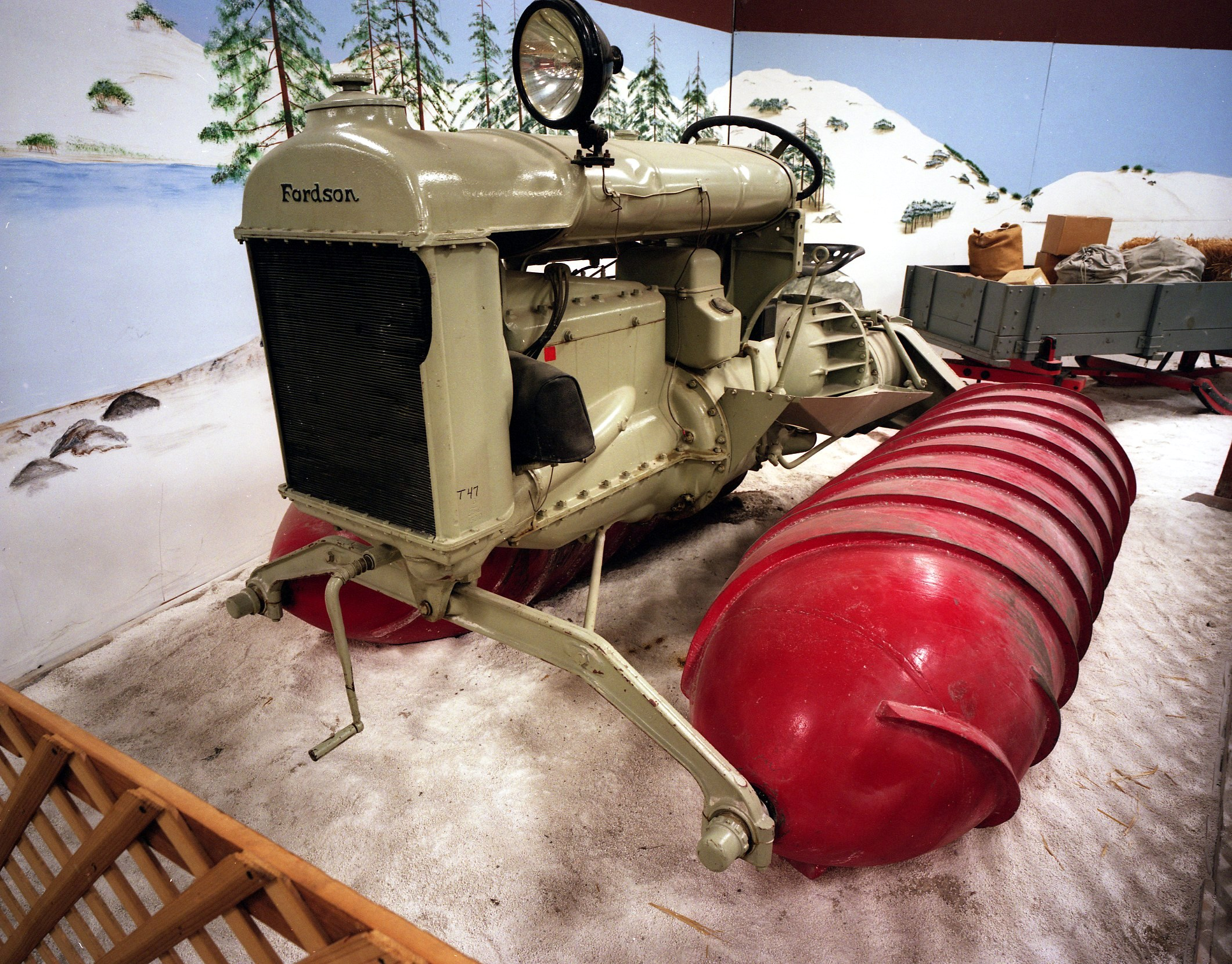
Fordson snowmobile at the Hays Antique Truck Museum, Woodland, California.

In the 1920s the Armstead Snow Motor was developed. This was used to convert a Fordson tractor into a screw-propelled vehicle with a single pair of cylinders. A machine used in the Truckee, CA area was referred to by locals as the "Snow Devil" and that name has been erroneously attached to these machines, although no known advertising of the time referred to them as such. A film was made to show the capabilities of the vehicle as well as a Chevrolet car fitted with an Armstead Snow Motor. The film clearly shows that the vehicle copes well in snow. Steering was effected by having each cylinder receive power from a separate clutch which depending on the position of the steering gear, engages and disengages; this results in a vehicle that is relatively maneuverable. The promotional film shows the Armstead snow motor hauling 20 tons of logs.

In January 1926, Time magazine reported:

Having used the motor car for almost every other conceivable purpose, leading Detroit automobile makers have now organized a company entitled "Snow Motors Inc.," to put out a machine which will negotiate the deepest snowdrifts at six to eight miles an hour. The new car will consist of a Ford tractor power-plant mounted on two revolving cylinders instead of wheels — something on the order of a steam roller. The machine has already proved its usefulness in deep snow previously unnavigable. One such machine has done the work which formerly required three teams. In Oregon a stage line uses a snow motor in its two daily round trips over the Mackenzie Pass between Eugene and Bend. Orders are already in hand from Canada, Norway, Sweden, and Alaska. The Hudson Bay Co. has ordered a supply to maintain communications with its most northern fur-trading stations. The North-West Mounted Police have also gone into the market for snow motors, and may cease to be horsemen and become chauffeurs, to the deep regret of cinema people. A number of prominent motor makers have also been interested in the proposition from the angle of adapting the snow motors equipment to their ordinary models. Hudson, Dodge and Chevrolet are mentioned especially as interested in practical possibilities along this line.

An extant example is in the collection of the Hays Antique Truck Museum in Woodland, California. This particular vehicle is said to have been used to haul mail from Truckee to North Lake Tahoe.

== The Second World War period ==
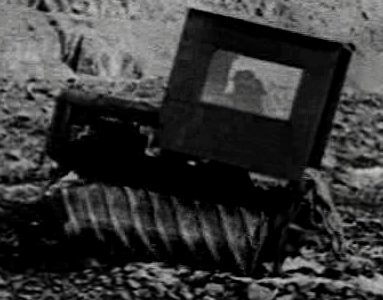
A screw-propelled prototype of the Weasel (probably a Fordson Snow Devil with a lightweight drivers cabin)

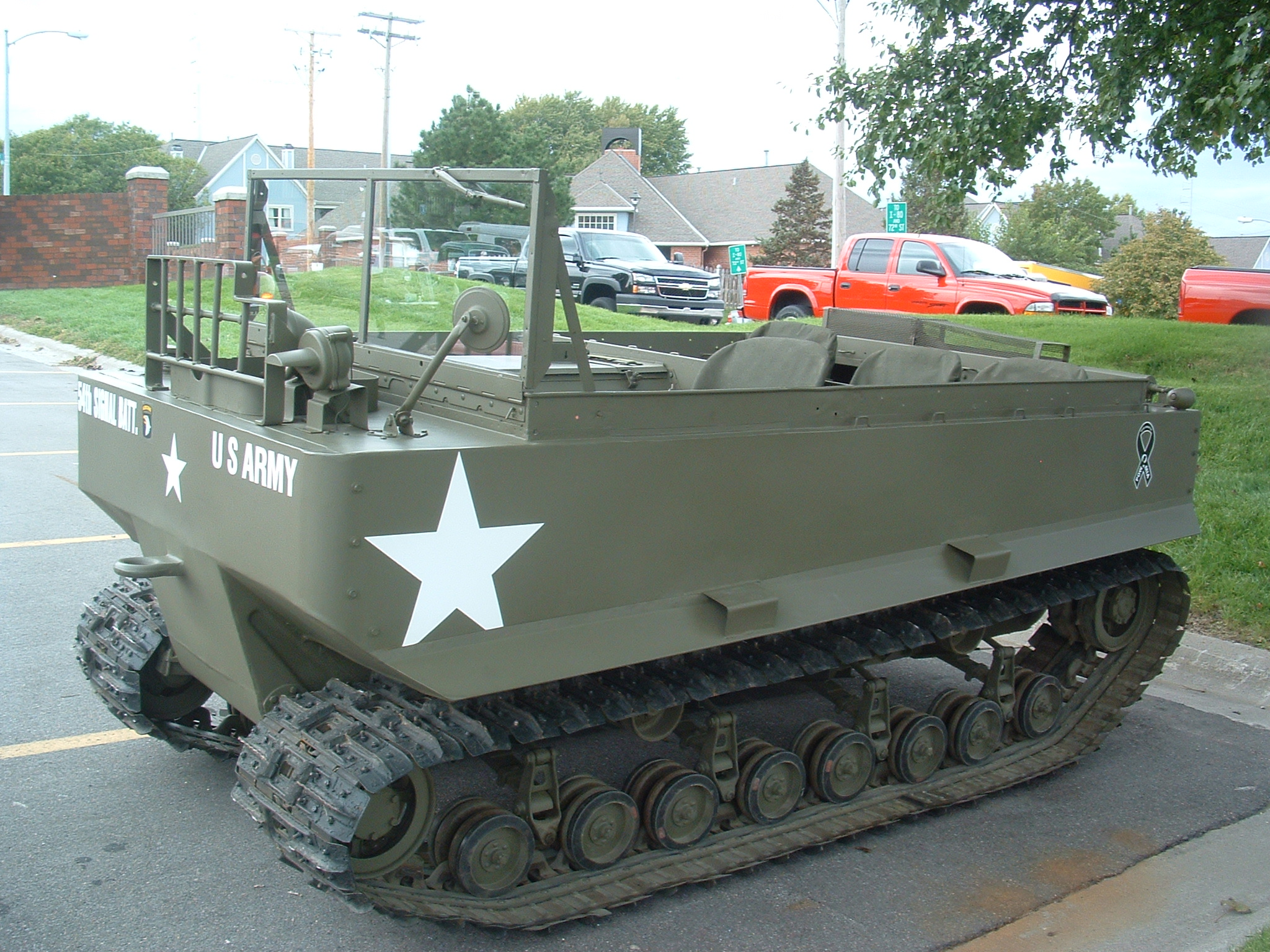
The M29 Weasel eventually produced

With the occupation of Norway by Nazi Germany in World War II, the quixotic Geoffrey Pyke considered the problem of transporting soldiers rapidly over snow. He proposed the development of a screw-propelled vehicle based on the Armstead snow motor. Pyke envisaged that the vehicles would be used by a small force of highly mobile soldiers. The damage and casualties that a small force could inflict might be slight, but they would oblige the enemy to keep many men stationed in Norway in order to guard against every possible point of attack. Pyke's ideas were initially rejected, but in October 1941, Louis Mountbatten became Chief of Combined Operations and Pyke's ideas received a more sympathetic hearing. Mountbatten became convinced that Pyke's plan was worthwhile and adopted it. The scheme became Project Plough and many high-level conferences were dedicated to it.

The problem of developing a suitable vehicle was passed to the Americans, and Pyke went to the US to oversee the development. However, Pyke, who could be very inflexible, fell out with various individuals on the project and the Americans moved on to design a more conventional tracked vehicle, the M29 Weasel.

In 1944, Johannes Raedel, a soldier of the German Army and veteran of the Eastern Front invented his schraubenantrieb schneemaschine (screw-propelled snow machine). Raedel had seen the problems of operating tracked vehicles in the deep snows of Russia where a tank would dig out the snow under the tracks leaving the tank stuck on the snow compressed under the hull.

According to Siegfried Raedel, son of Johannes:

The vehicle idea evolved while looking at a meat mincer, also employing a screw type of compression. He convinced the OKH in Berlin to allow him to make a prototype of his concept machine. At that time, Austria was annexed to Germany already and he was dispatched to the Austrian Alpine Vehicle Test Center at St. Johann in Tyrol. Using whatever materials were available, he built a working prototype during the period of 10 February 1944 to 28 April 1944. It was tested extensively. It was very slow, but it could pull one ton. It also possessed good climbing capabilities. It would penetrate about 30 cm into the snow, but no more. Raedel's machine never went into production.

== Amphibians ==
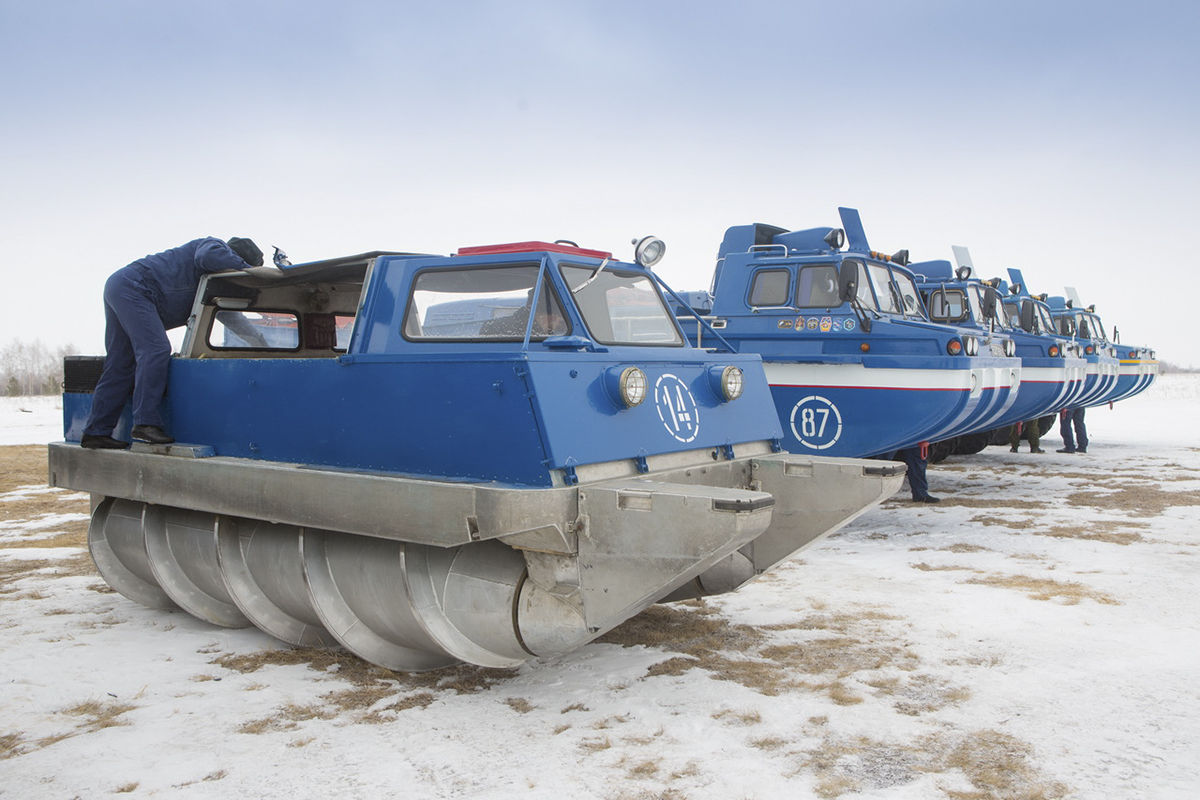
ZIL-29061, an upgraded ZIL-2906

The threaded cylinders are necessarily large to ensure a substantial area of contact and buoyancy. Being lightweight, the cylinders may conveniently serve as floats and the arrangement may be used in the design of an amphibious vehicle.

During the Vietnam War, the American Waterways Experiment Station (WES) tested the Marsh Screw Amphibian, designed by the Chrysler Corporation. The vehicle's barge-like hull was built of aluminum. It was fitted with vertical supports at the four corners that supported the two rotating, bladed drums. The vehicle weighed under 2500 pounds and could carry a 1000 pound load. The Marsh Screw Amphibian proved fastest on packed snow, where it could exceed 20 miles per hour (32 km/h; 17 kn). It could move at 14 miles per hour (23 km/h; 12 kn) in marshy conditions and 8 miles per hour (13 km/h; 7.0 kn) in water. The vehicle "failed miserably on soil surfaces, especially sand" where it traveled only 1.6 miles per hour (2.6 km/h; 1.4 kn)".

Despite such disappointing results, Chrysler produced a much larger vehicle, the Riverine Utility Craft (RUC) for the Navy in 1969. The RUC travelled on two aluminium rotors, 39 inches (991 mm) in diameter. The RUC achieved impressive speeds of 15.7 knots (29.1 km/h) on water and nearly 25 knots (46 km/h) on marsh. Again, however, speeds on firm soils proved disappointing, reaching only 3.6 knots (6.7 km/h) and crossing dykes proved difficult – the vehicle would get stuck. It was powered with two Chrysler marine V-8 engines and pair of two-speed automatic transmissions.

The Soviets built the ZIL-2906, a screw-propelled vehicle, or as they are known in Russian, a shnekohod, specifically for the challenging task of recovering cosmonauts who landed in inaccessible areas.

In the 1960s, Joseph Jean de Bakker was the busy owner of the De Bakker machine factory in Hulst in the southwest of the Netherlands. He was also a keen fisherman, but he did not want his fishing time to be constrained by the vagaries of the tide. His solution was the Amphirol, a screw-propelled vehicle superficially similar to the Marsh Screw Amphibian. The Amphirol was able to convey him over the sticky clay revealed by the outgoing tide and to swim in water at high tide.

De Bakker's Amphirol had a top speed of 12 km/h (6.5 knots) on mud and 10 km/h (5.4 knots) in water. It was powered by two modified DAF 44/55 variomatic transmission units; this made possible the significant innovation that the flanged cylinders could be deliberately driven in the same direction so that the vehicle could crab sideways on dry land at the alarming speed of 30 km/h (16 knots). Also, when moving sideways, steering is effected by shifting the front of the cylinders so that they are no longer parallel – giving a large minimum turning radius.

Amphirols are used for ground surveying, for grooving the surface of newly drained polders to assist drying, and to carry soil-drilling teams.

Today modern vehicles, widely known as amphirols, perform specialised tasks such as compacting tailings from industrial processes. The advantage of these machines to tailings densification is that they provide a means to allow water or process liquor to run off without repulping the profile. This approach subsequently largely negates the impact of rainfall on densification and dewatering. However, the lighter, faster machines are better suited to marginal terrain access, but not densification due to repulping and their limited penetration depth. The process of using these machines specifically for tailings and dredge spoil densification is commonly termed "mud farming" in the mining industry.

== Recent developments ==
The British Ice Challenger exploration team used a screw drive in their Snowbird 6 vehicle (a modified Bombardier tracked craft) to traverse the ice floes in the Bering Strait. The rotating cylinders allowed Snowbird 6 to move over ice and to propel itself through water, but the screw system was not considered suitable for long distances, and the cylinders could be raised so that the vehicle could also run on conventional caterpillar tracks. The Ice Challenger website says that the design was inspired by a Russian vehicle used to pick up cosmonauts who landed in Siberia (perhaps the ZIL-2906).

Russian inventor Alexey Burdin has come up with a screw-propulsion system "TESH-drive Transformable worms".

More recently, mud farming with larger machines capable of deep profile penetration (termed MudMasters by their manufacturer) has proven to be an efficient method for high intensity tailings management.

Small screw-propelled robots have been introduced for grain warehouses (storage facilities), with development efforts reported in both the United States and China. These remote-controlled or autonomous devices are designed to traverse grain surfaces using screw-propelled locomotion, performing tasks such as breaking crusts and leveling stored grain. Their primary function is to reduce the necessity for human entry into grain bins, which are associated with risks of entrapment, suffocation, and dust-related respiratory conditions.

== See also ==
- Counter-rotating propellers – Propellers that rotate on opposite directions
- Roller ship
- Metal Gear Solid 3: Snake Eater, which prominently features a fictitious screw-propelled vehicle called the Shagohod
