= Zil (disambiguation) =

ZIL or Zil may refer to:

- ZiL (Zavod imeni Likhachova), a former car and truck factory in Moscow, Russia
  - ZiL lanes, dedicated traffic lanes for Soviet officials
- ZIL (Moscow Central Circle), a Moscow Metro railway station
- Zil, Iran, a village in Kerman Province
- Zil, Kurds, a Kurdish tribal federation
- Zills, also zils or finger cymbals, tiny cymbals used in belly dancing and similar performance
- Zork Implementation Language, used by the Z-machine
- ZFS Intent Log, where ZFS transactions are assembled before committing; see Oracle ZFS
- Land of Zill, a place in Felix the Cat: The Movie

== See also ==
- Zimbabwe Institute of Legal Studies (ZILS)
