= ZIL-118 =

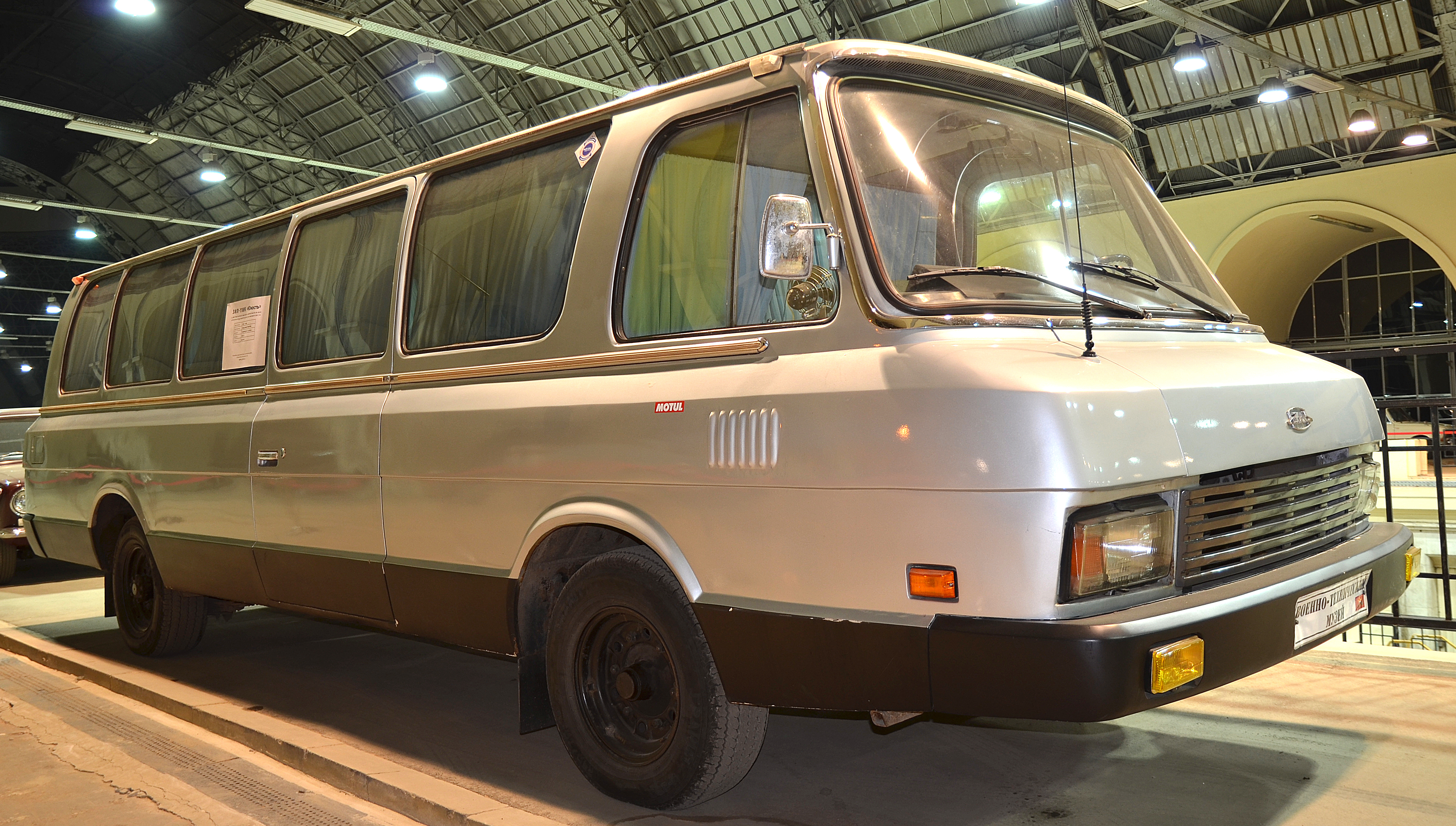

Overview
- Manufacturer: ZIL
- Production: 1962–1994
- Assembly: Soviet Union/Russia: Moscow

Body and chassis
- Body style: Microbus
- Layout: FR layout
- Related: ZIL-111

Powertrain
- Engine: 6.0 L ZIL-130 V8 (1962–1965); 6.0 L ZIL-111 V8 (1965–1970)

Dimensions
- Wheelbase: 3,760 mm (148.0 in)
- Length: 6,840 mm (269.3 in)
- Width: 2,110 mm (83.1 in)
- Height: 2,067 mm (81.4 in)
- Curb weight: 3,320 kg (7,319 lb)

Chronology
- Successor: ZIL-119

The ZIL-118 Yunost ("Youth") is a microbus built by Zavod imeni Likhachova (Russian: Завод имени Лихачёва, Factory named for Likhachov), or ZIL.

Based on the ZIL-111 limousine, the ZIL-118 Yunost was developed in 1961, on the factory's own initiative. It was available in two versions, the microbus 118 and the ambulance 118A. Only 20 were initially built because of a lack of interest of government. The few built were solely to special order, with a number as high-capacity ambulances. An updated version appeared in 1970 in several versions: the ZIL-118K coach ZIL-118KS ambulance, both using the ZIL-508.10 V8 from ZIL trucks.

The ZIL-118 was further facelifted in the 1980s, becoming the ZIL-3207. Production ended in 1994, with total number built, of the ZIL-118K/KS and ZIL-3207, reaching only 86.

== Variants ==
- ZIL-118A: Ambulance version of ZIL-118.
- ZIL-119 (ZIL-118K): Modernized ZIL-118.
- ZIL-119A (ZIL-118KA): Ambulance version of ZIL-119.
- ZIL-3302: Prototype truck based on ZIL-119.
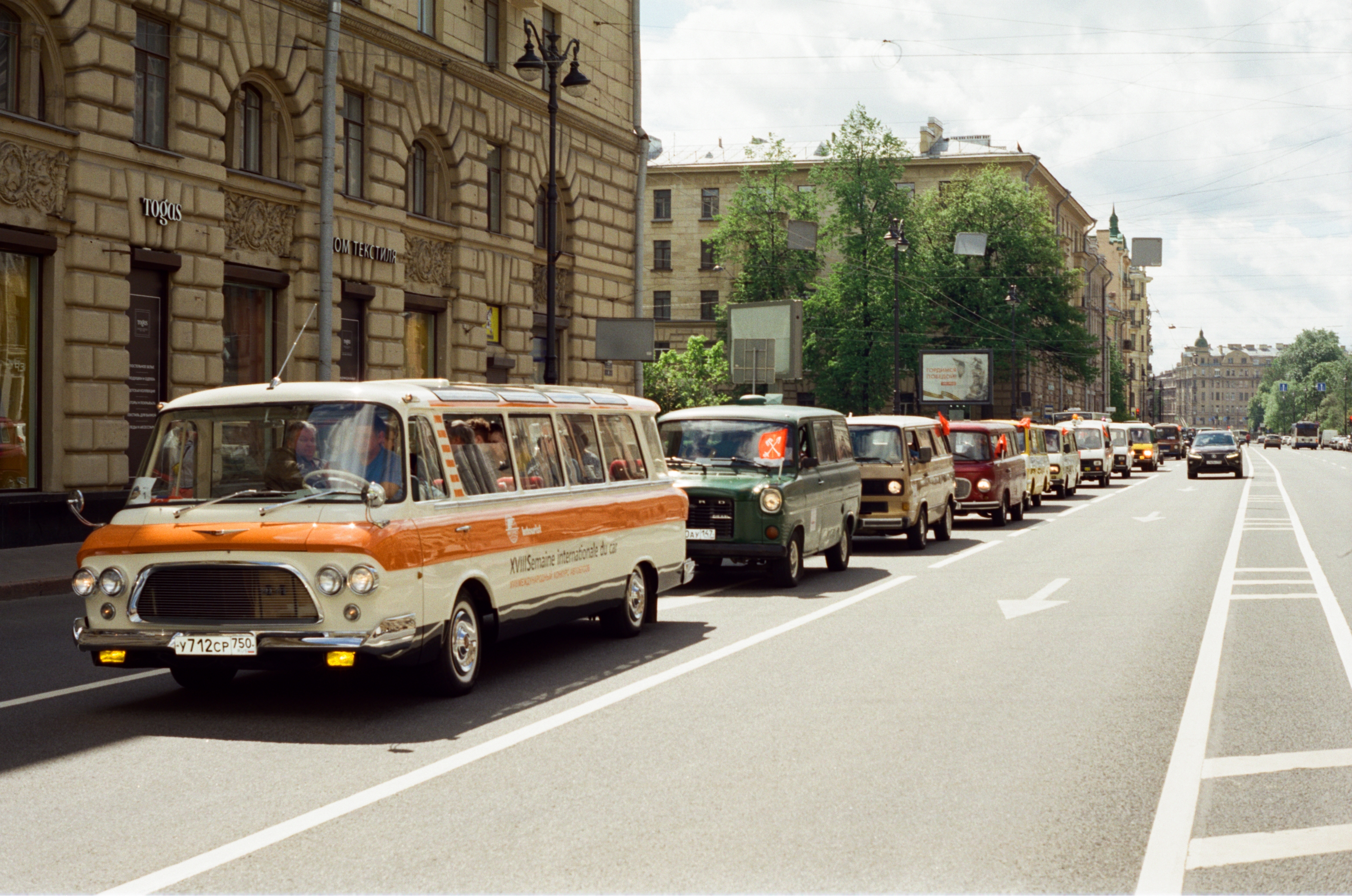

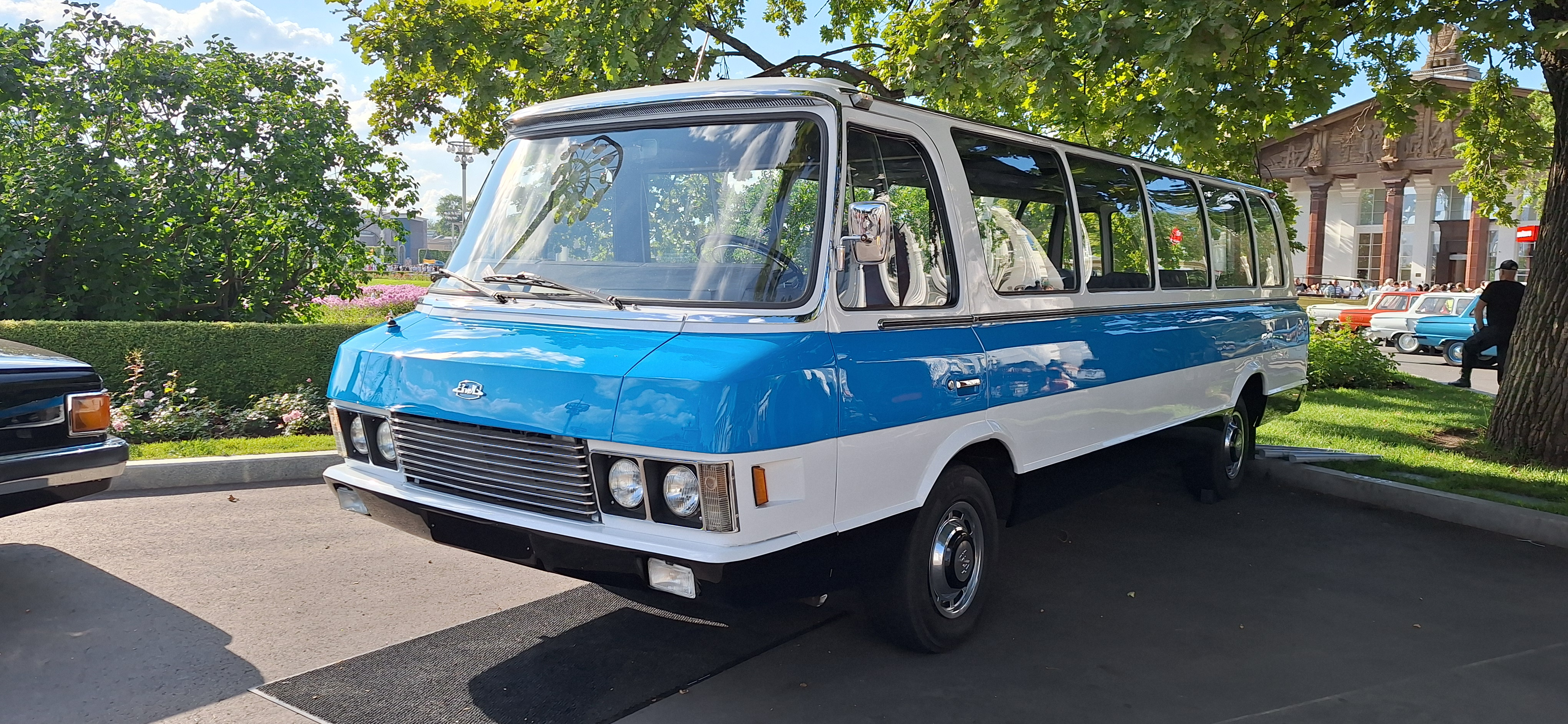

== Sources ==
- Thompson, Andy. Cars of the Soviet Union. Somerset, UK: Haynes Publishing, 2008.
