= ZIL-4104 =

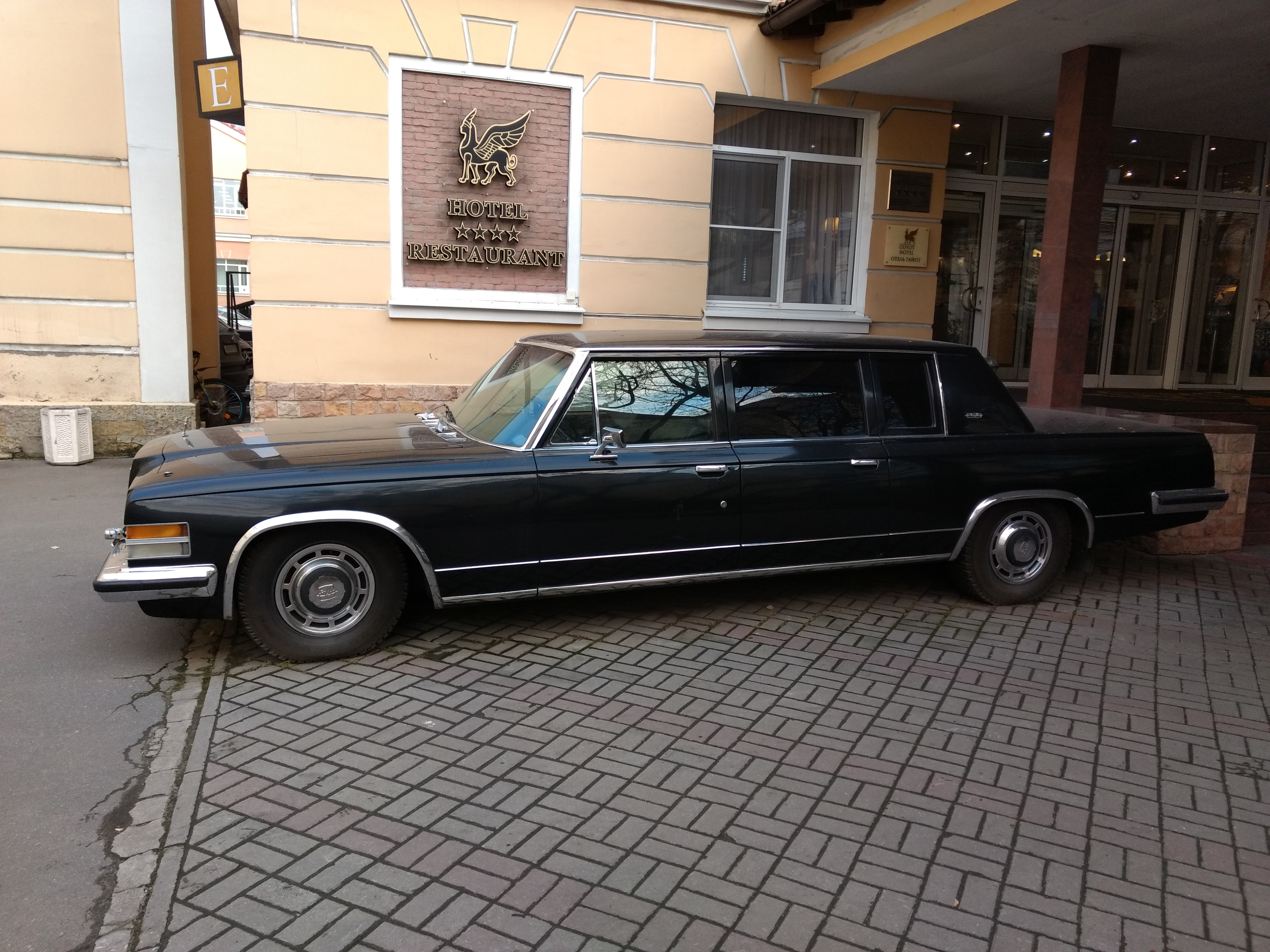

Overview
- Manufacturer: Zavod Imeni Likhacheva
- Production: 1978–1985; 106 built
- Assembly: Soviet Union: Moscow (Likhachov Plant)

Body and chassis
- Class: Luxury car
- Body style: Limousine
- Layout: FR layout

Powertrain
- Engine: 7.7L ZIL-4104 V8
- Transmission: 2-speed automatic (1978–1983); 3-speed automatic (1984–1985)

Dimensions
- Length: 6,339 mm (249.6 in)
- Width: 2,068 mm (81.4 in)
- Height: 1,500 mm (59 in)
- Curb weight: 3,400 kg (7,500 lb)

Chronology
- Predecessor: ZIL-117 (ZIL-115); ZIL-114 (ZIL-4104)
- Successor: ZIL-41041 (ZIL-115); ZIL-41047 (ZIL-4104/41045); ZIL-41052 (ZIL-4105/41051)

The ZIL-4104 was a limousine built by ZiL from the late 1970s to the early 1980s, when it served as the transport of the elite of the Soviet Union. It is estimated that no more than fifty cars were produced each year.

Originally designated ZIL-115, the ZIL-4104 was an update of the ZIL-114 with which it shared the same chassis and over half its mechanical components. Despite sharing the same chassis, the ZIL-4104 was as much as 314 kg (692 lb) heavier than the 114.

Mechanically, the ZIL-4104 also improved on the 114. The V8 pushrod engine of the 114 had its stroke increased from 95 to 105 mm (3.7 to 4.1 in). With a 108 mm (4.3 in) bore, this meant the capacity increased from 6,959 to 7,695 cc (425 to 470 cu in), which was throughout the model's lifespan one of the world's biggest passenger-car engines (Cadillac produced a 7,730 cc (472 cu in) engine, enlarged to 8,200 cc (500 cu in)). This engine developed 235 kW (315 hp) SAE Gross at 4,400 rpm and a substantial 608 N⋅m (448 lb⋅ft) at 2500 rpm.

Among its special features were special laminated windscreen and triple-layered windows, supposedly offering protection from radiation in case of nuclear attack, plus duplicated systems, including dual ignition, two 74-amp batteries in parallel, and two fuel pumps.

The console and dash were covered with 10 mm (0.39 in) thick birch grown in Karelia, and the rear seat controlled radio (a Riga receiver), power windows, heater, and air conditioner; in the console in front was a Vilma cassette player.

The fuel tank was 120 L (32 US gal; 26 imp gal) and the car used leaded 95 octane petrol, getting 22 L/100 km (11 mpg_{‑US}; 13 mpg_{‑imp}).

By 1984, a new three-speed automatic transmission had replaced the much outdated two-speed type that had been used by ZIL dating back to the first ZIL-111 in 1958.

As official state cars, the ZIL-4104s were "built under conditions of strict secrecy" and were "maintained in closed garages by a special division of the KGB", with everyone involved in building and servicing them sworn to secrecy.

== Variants ==
- ZIL-4104: Base model. Also known as ZIL-115; produced from 1978 to 1983.
- ZIL-4105: Armored version of ZIL-4104.
- ZIL-41042: Ambulance version. Also known as ZIL-115A.
- ZIL-41043: As ZIL-41042 except with communications equipment.
- ZIL-41044: Short wheelbase convertible version.
- ZIL-41045: Restyled ZIL-4104; produced from 1983 to 1985.
- ZIL-41046: Radio car version.
- ZIL-41048: ZIL-4104 with automatic climate control; produced in 1984.
- ZIL-41051: Armored version of ZIL-41045.

== ZIL-41044 and ZIL-41042 ==
In the later years of the 4104 production run, ZIL introduced two derived models based on the 4104 chassis and the shortened ZIL-117 chassis not previously used with the 7.7 litre engine.

- The 41044 was a shorter-wheelbase convertible. Unlike previous ZIL convertibles, it had only two doors but otherwise it was typically ZIL.
- The 41042 was a rare station wagon produced by ZIL, but the few examples built were used as ambulances for general secretaries in the Soviet Union.

== Gallery ==
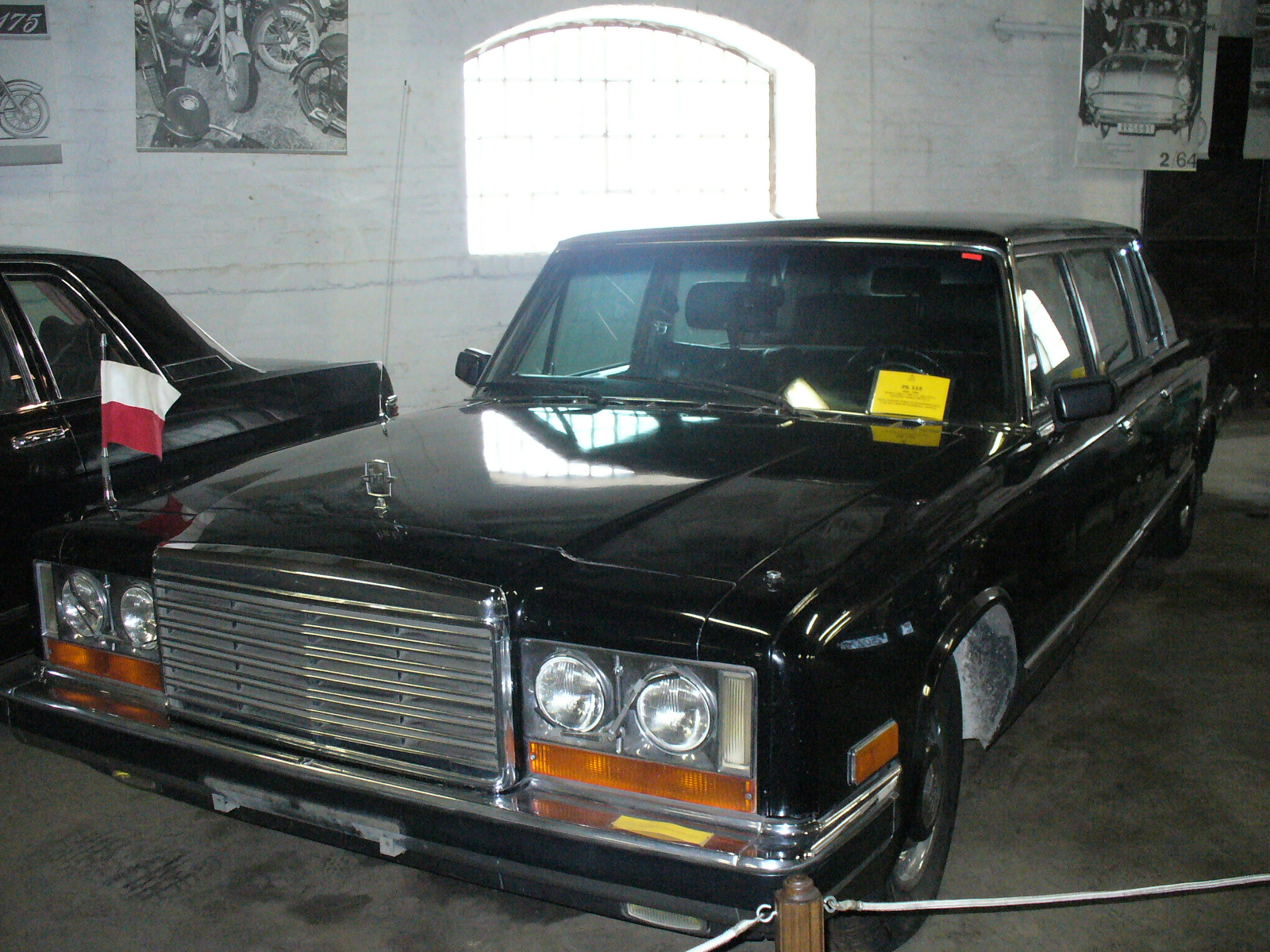
41045

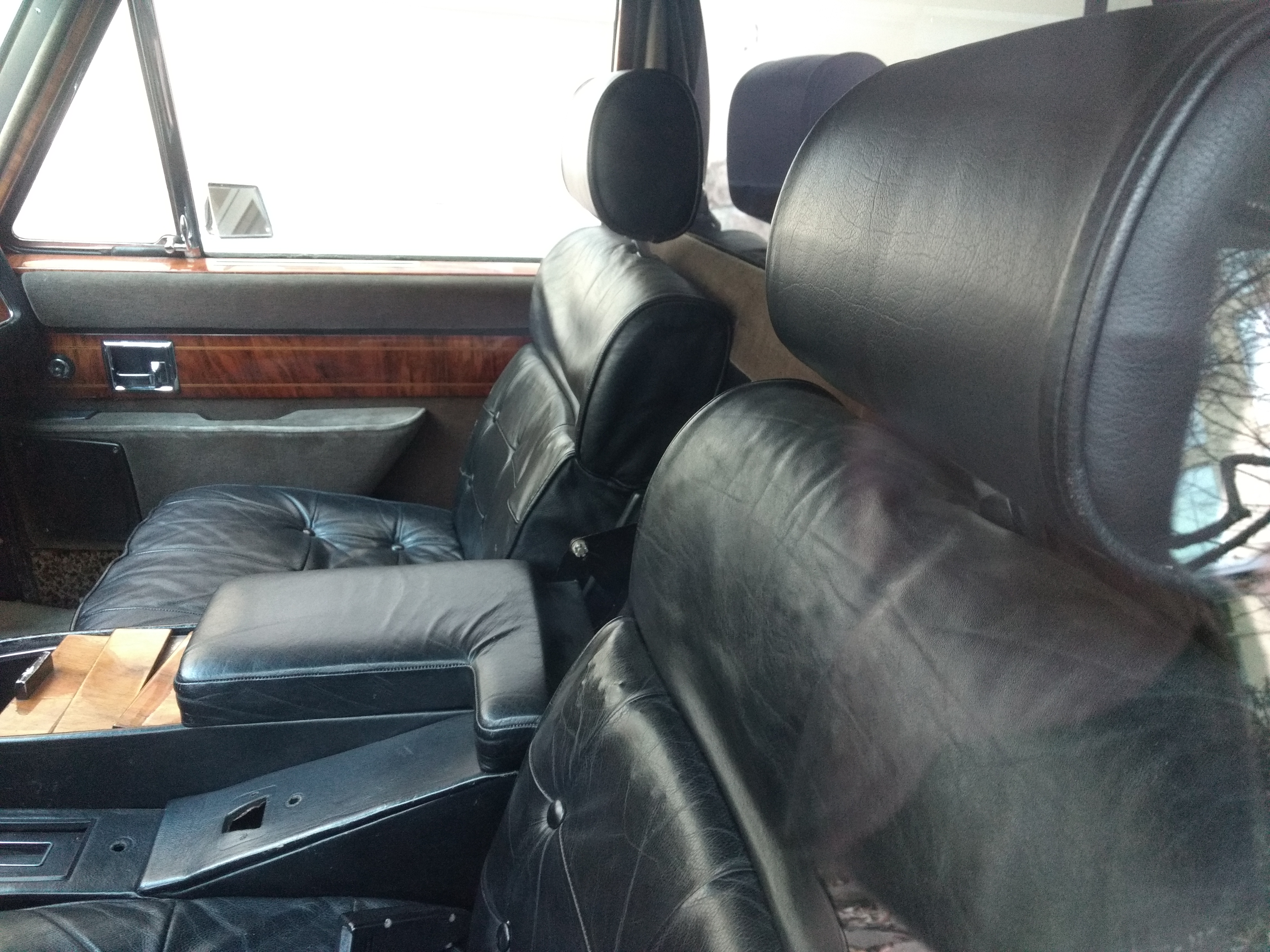
ZIL-115

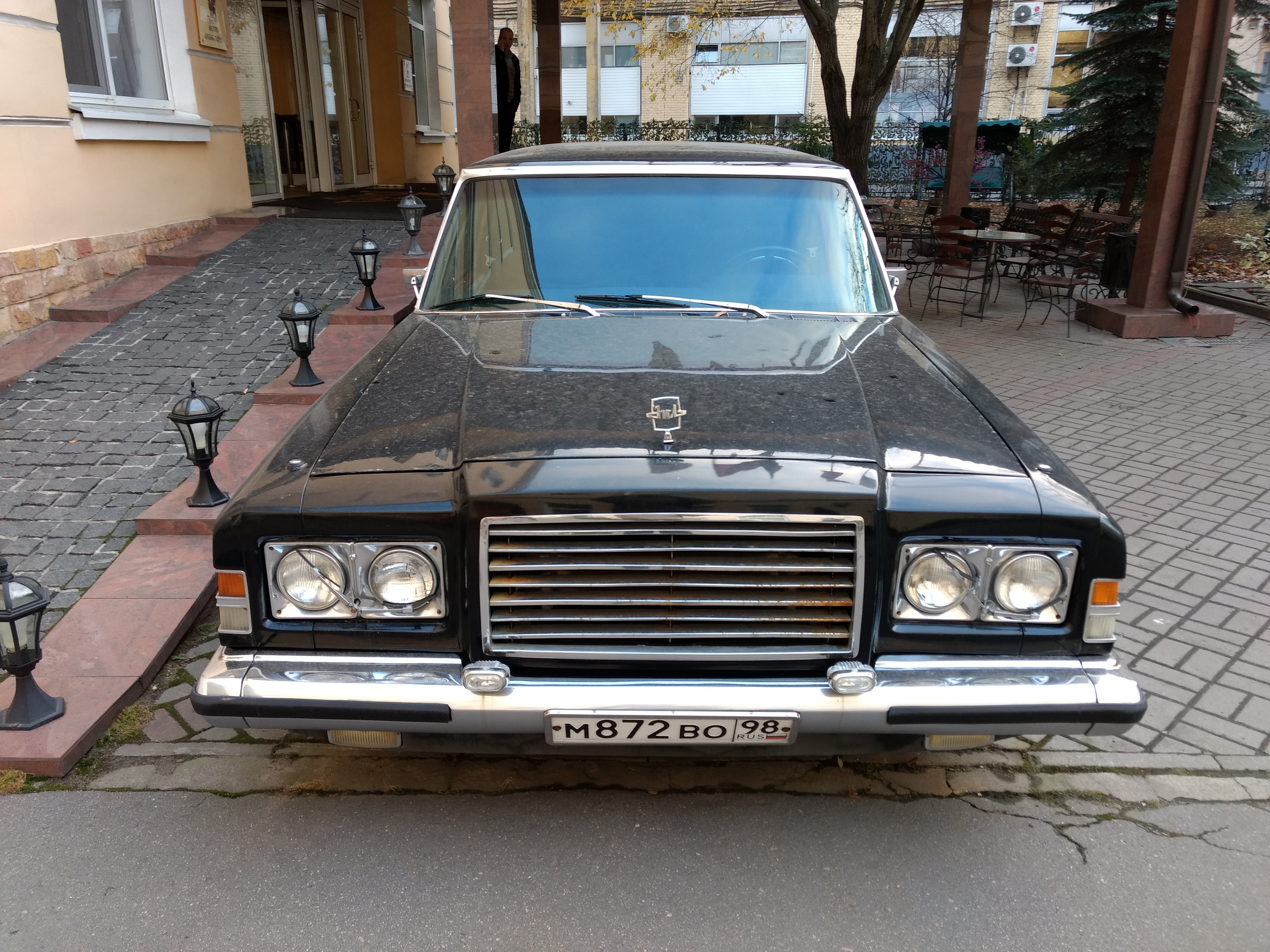

== Sources ==
- Thompson, Andy. Cars of the Soviet Union. Somerset, UK: Haynes Publishing, 2008.
