= Olympic route network =

Dedicated roads during Olympic games

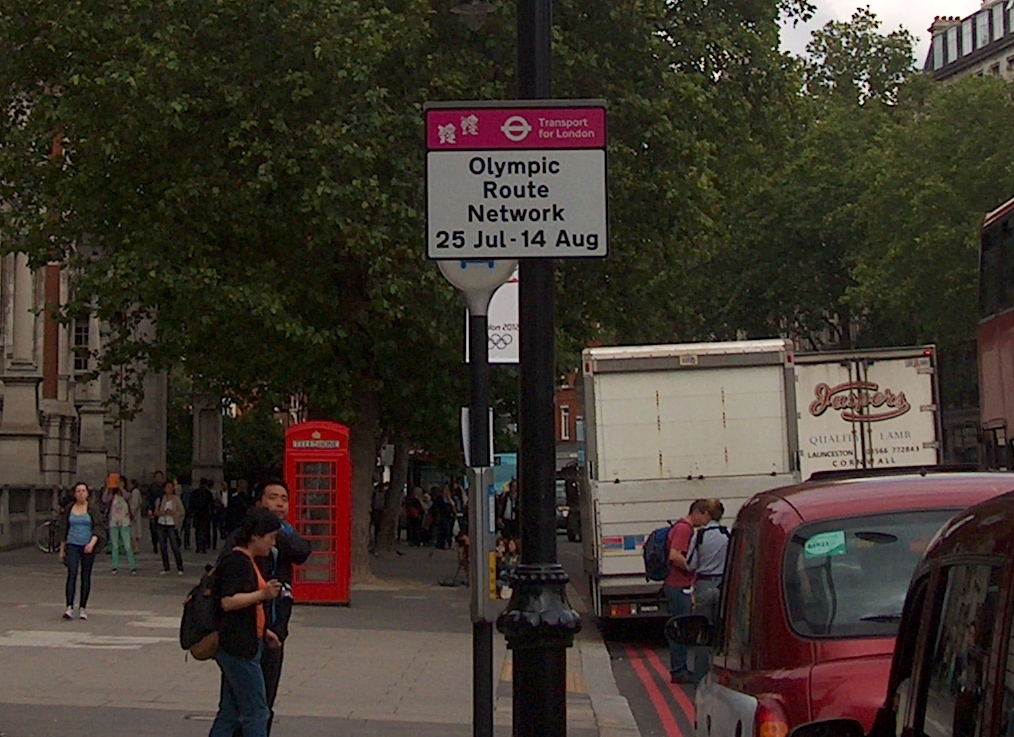
Sign on Cromwell Road during London 2012 giving information on the Olympic route network

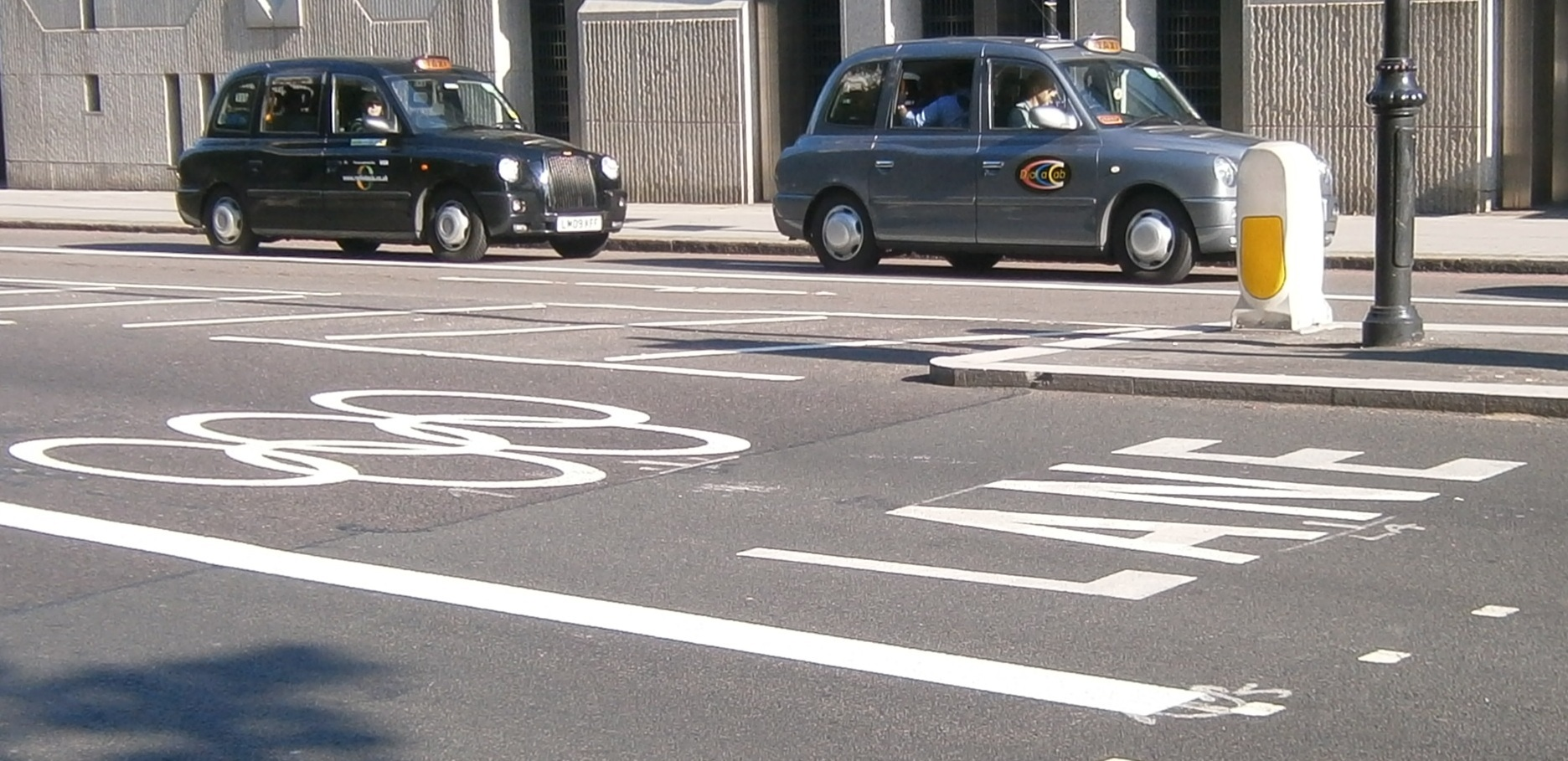
Dedicated games lane on Cromwell Road as part of the Olympic route network during London 2012

An Olympic route network (ORN) and Paralympic route network (PRN) is a network of dedicated roads linking venues and other key sites in a host city during Olympic and Paralympic games to ensure that athletes and officials get to events on time. Roads that are part of the network have 'games lanes' which are reserved for accredited games vehicles and on-call emergency vehicles.

For the 2012 Olympic and Paralympic Games, a route network came into effect under the London Olympic Games and Paralympic Games Act 2006 which gave the Olympic Delivery Authority temporary powers to take over traffic management measures during London 2012.

The ORN and PRN were first introduced for the 2000 Sydney Olympics as a result of problems at the Atlanta Olympics four years earlier when athletes had difficulty getting to their events on time. In July 2012, just before the start of the 2012 Olympics, London taxi drivers blocked some games lanes to protest against the ORN. The games lanes for London 2012 has been pejoratively referred to as ZiL lanes, in reference to dedicated lanes for VIPs in Moscow.

The ORN and PRN for the 2012 Olympics were controlled by the London Streets Traffic Control Center (LSTCC). They used computer systems as well as CCTV cameras to control London's traffic. By using the technology, the LSTCC was able to make sure vehicles on the ORN were able to reach their destinations in a straightforward manner.
