= ZIL-117 =

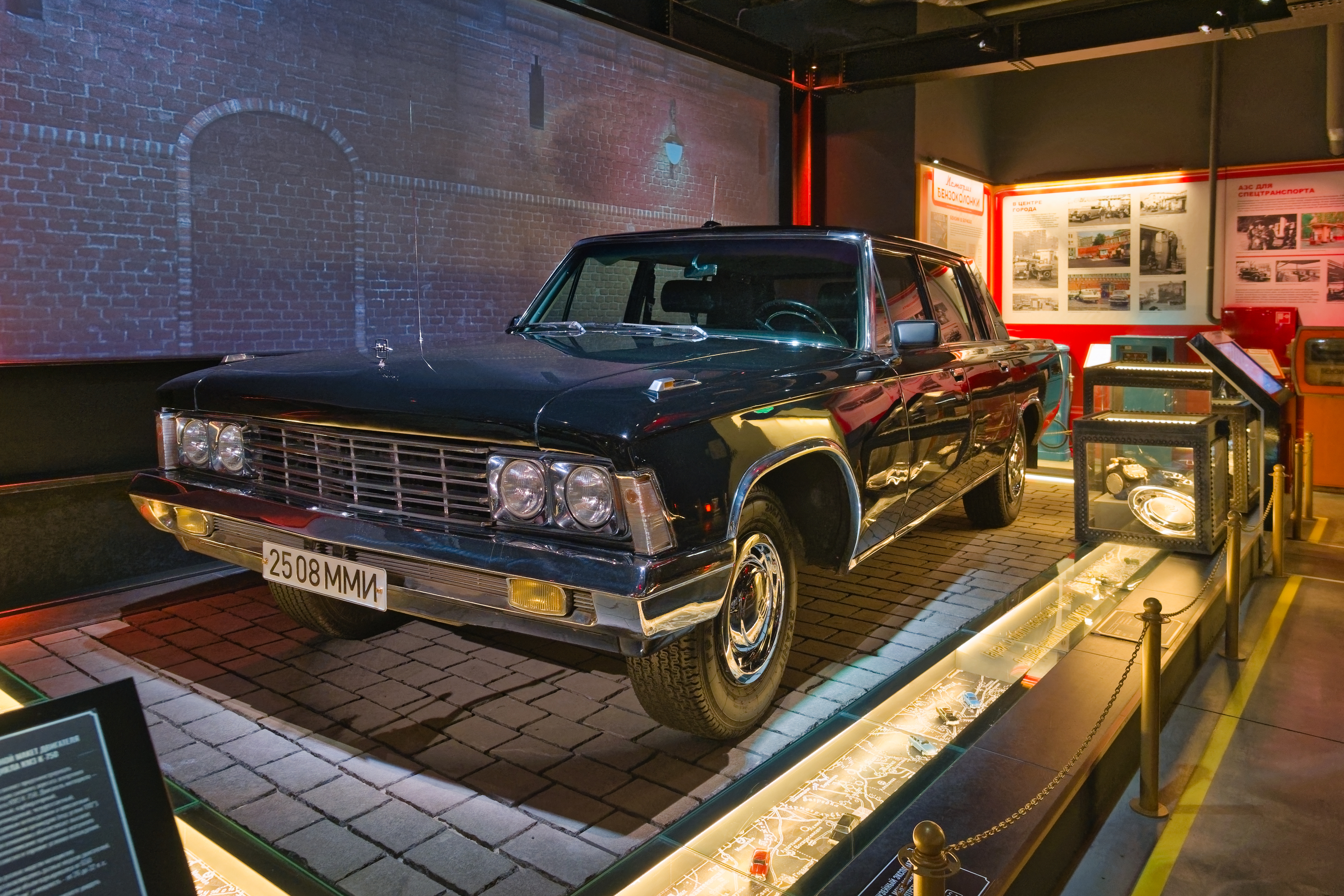

Overview
- Manufacturer: Zavod Imeni Likhacheva
- Production: 1971–1979; 50 built
- Assembly: Soviet Union: Moscow (Likhachov Plant)

Body and chassis
- Class: Luxury car
- Body style: 4-door saloon; 2-door convertible; 4-door convertible
- Layout: FR layout
- Related: ZIL-114

Powertrain
- Engine: 7.0L ZIL-114 V8
- Transmission: 2-speed automatic; 3-speed automatic (offered from April 1975)

Dimensions
- Wheelbase: 3,300 mm (129.9 in)
- Length: 5,725 mm (225.4 in)
- Width: 2,068 mm (81.4 in)
- Height: 1,520 mm (59.8 in)
- Curb weight: 2,880 kg (6,349 lb)

Chronology
- Successor: ZIL-115

The ZIL-117 is a luxury sedan built by ZiL in USSR and first presented at the Autoprom (precursor of the Moscow International Motor Show) in 1977. Debuting in 1971, it was derived from the earlier ZIL-114.

Design of the ZIL-117 began in 1968, with the first prototype running in 1969.

The ZIL-117 shares the 6,959 cc (424.7 cu in) V8 engine also fitted to the ZIL-114. Maximum power output of 300 hp SAE Gross at 4,400 rpm was claimed, using a relatively high 9.0:1 compression ratio, fuel feed being via a single four-choke carburettor. The car uses a two or three-speed automatic transmission and power steering came as standard. The factory claimed a maximum speed of between 118–125 mph (190–201 km/h).

The car was only 5,725 mm (225.4 in) long, compared to 247 inches (6,300 mm) for the ZIL-114, on a 3,310 mm (130 in) wheelbase (compared to 3,760 mm (148 in) for the ZIL-114. It seated five, rather than the seven of the ZIL-114.

One of the reasons to design the ZIL-117 was a need of a government car of an intermediate rank between ZIL-114 (reserved for highest state and party authorities) and GAZ-13 Chaika, appropriate for example for Politburo member candidates, and also as supporting cars in highest officials' convoys.

Only 50 were built. There was also a convertible, the ZIL-117V, produced from 1973 to 1979 (for military parades on Red Square).

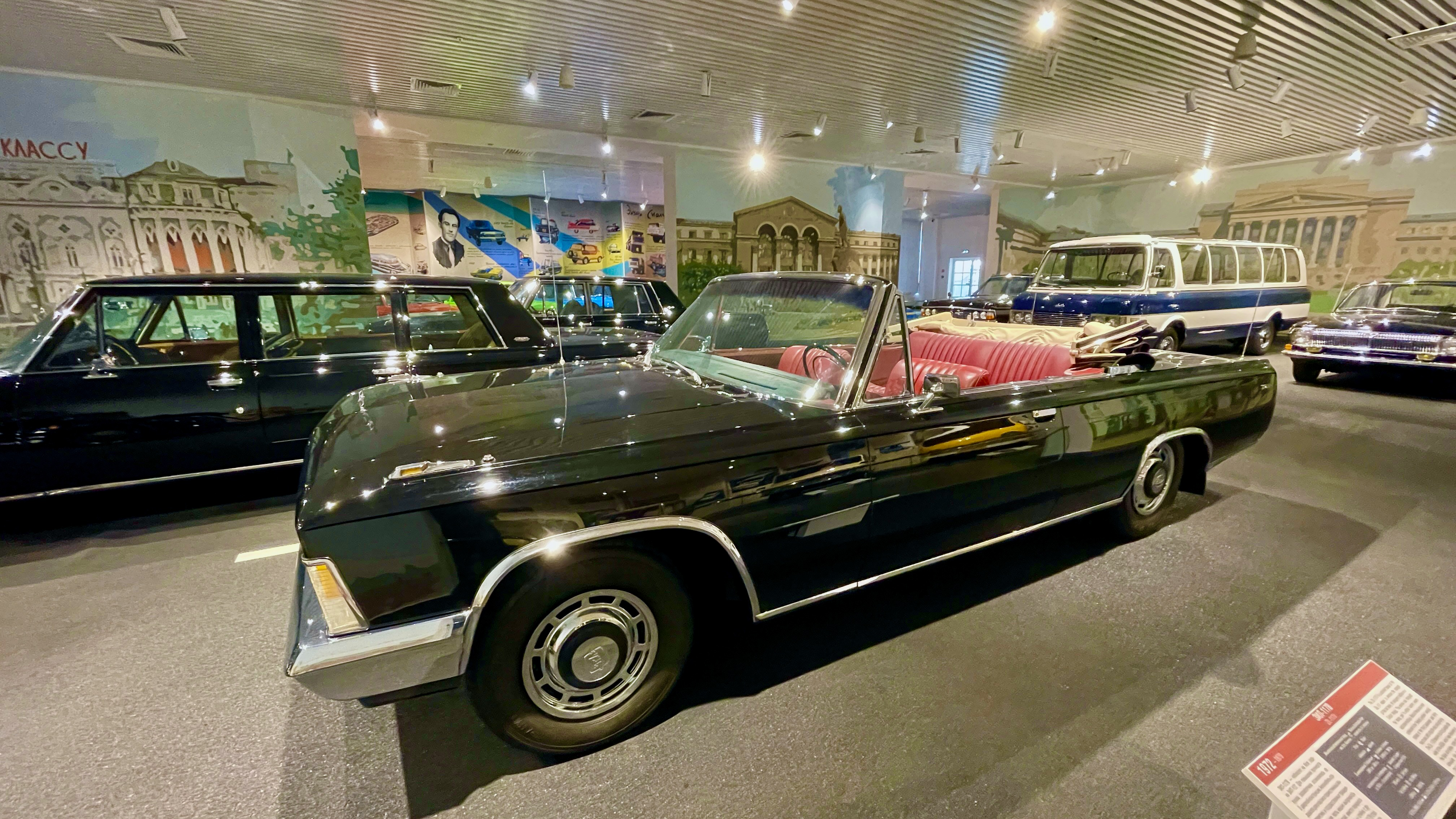
ZIL-117V

The ZIL-117 was replaced in 1986 by the mechanically similar ZIL-41041.

== Model cars ==
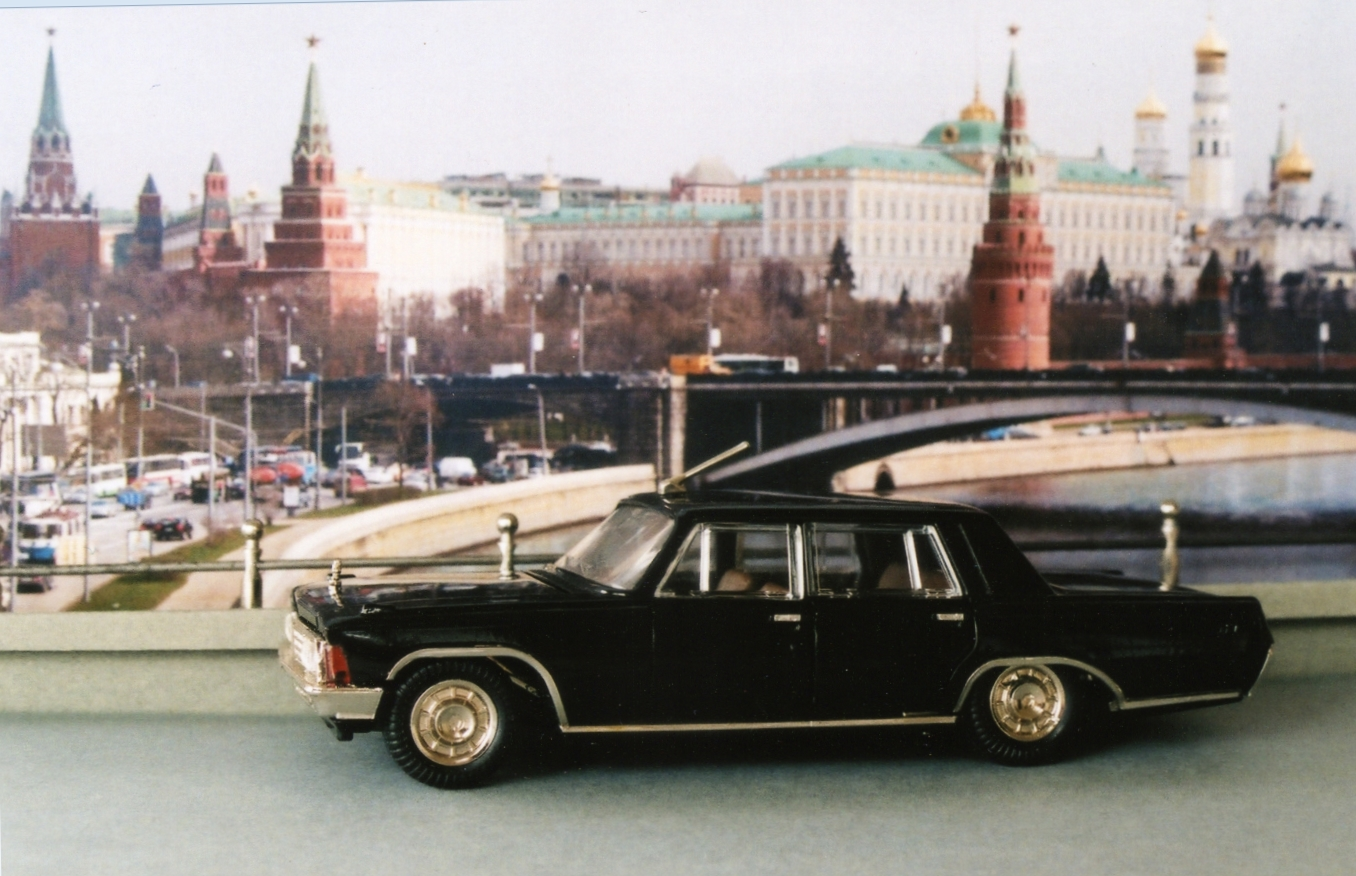
ZIL-117 1:43 scale model by Radon

Although made in limited numbers, the car has proven popular for die-cast model makers (on the contrary, the less rare 114 and the newer 41041 were not available in mass market until the 21st century). The first and most detailed was a 1:43 version released by Radon (Russia), a company which produced a wide range of Soviet-era vehicles (left). This heavy model was available in black or grey (the colour of army parade versions) with 12 moving parts, and featured opening doors and boot (with spare wheel), opening bonnet and detailed chromed engine, chrome metal trim and grill, rubber tyres and suspension, and perspex lights. Some examples had a metal aerial. Convertibles were also available in 2- or 4-door variants. Radon's post-Soviet successor Agat/Tantal released a white wedding version as well as the black, but quality can be poor compared to Soviet-era examples. In 2011 IXO/De Agostini released a black ZIL-117 with magazine detailing the car's history (having earlier produced a black ZIL-114). In line with other IXO models the body is basic with no opening panels, engine or suspension, and the exterior has painted trim/tail lights. Another version of this model was released as part of a series featuring cars from James Bond films (in this case Casino Royale) and included a magazine.

== Variants ==
- ZIL-117: Standard production version.
- ZIL-117V: Two-door open-top version. Produced 1973-1979.
- ZIL-117VE: As ZIL-117V but with a shielded ignition system.
