= Ivan Likhachev =

Soviet statesman

- Иван Лихачёв
- Likhachev in 1950s

Minister of Automobile Transport and Highways of USSR
- In office 26 August 1953 – 31 May 1956
- Preceded by: Position established
- Succeeded by: Position abolished

Minister of Automobile Transport and Highways of RSFSR
- In office June 1956 – 24 June 1956
- Preceded by: Position established
- Succeeded by: Position abolished

People's Commissar for Medium Machine Building of USSR
- In office 5 February 1939 – 2 October 1940
- Preceded by: Position established
- Succeeded by: Vyacheslav Malyshev

Personal details
- Born: Russian: Ива́н Алексе́евич Лихачёв; 15 June 1896
- Died: 24 June 1956 (aged 60)
- Occupation: industrialist
- Known for: creation and management of the Moscow 1st State Automobile Plant (later named Likhachev Plant)
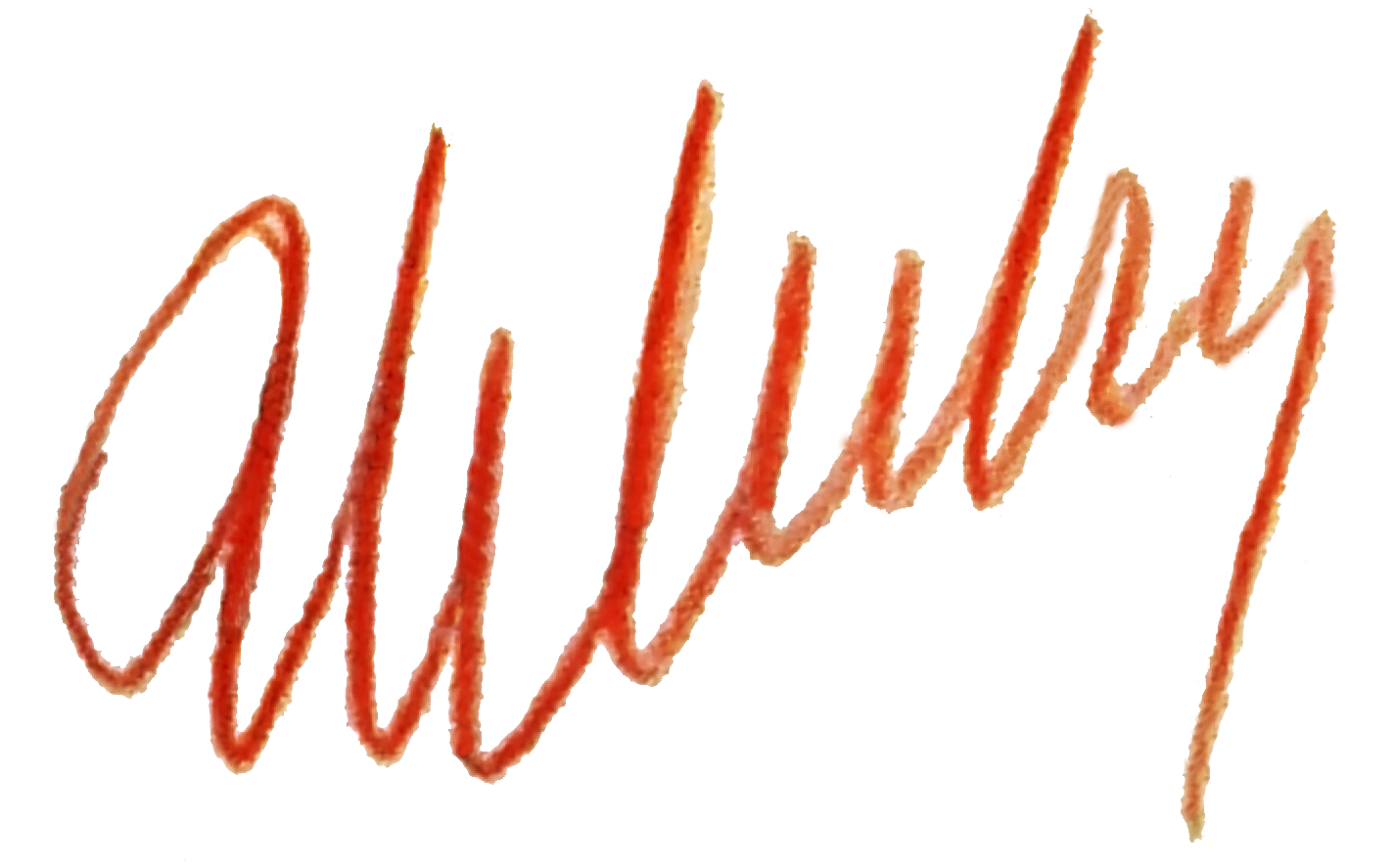
- Signature

Ivan Alekseyevich Likhachev (Russian: Ива́н Алексе́евич Лихачёв; 15 June 1896 — 24 June 1956) was a Soviet statesman, one of the organizers of the Soviet automobile industry. He is known as the director of the Moscow 1st State Automobile Plant (now the Likhachev Plant). Member of the Central Executive Committee of the USSR of the 7th convocation, deputy of the Supreme Soviet of the USSR of 1-5 convocations. Member of the Central Committee of the CPSU (b) (1939–1941), candidate member of the Central Committee of the CPSU (1956).
