= ZIL-114 =

Soviet luxury limousine

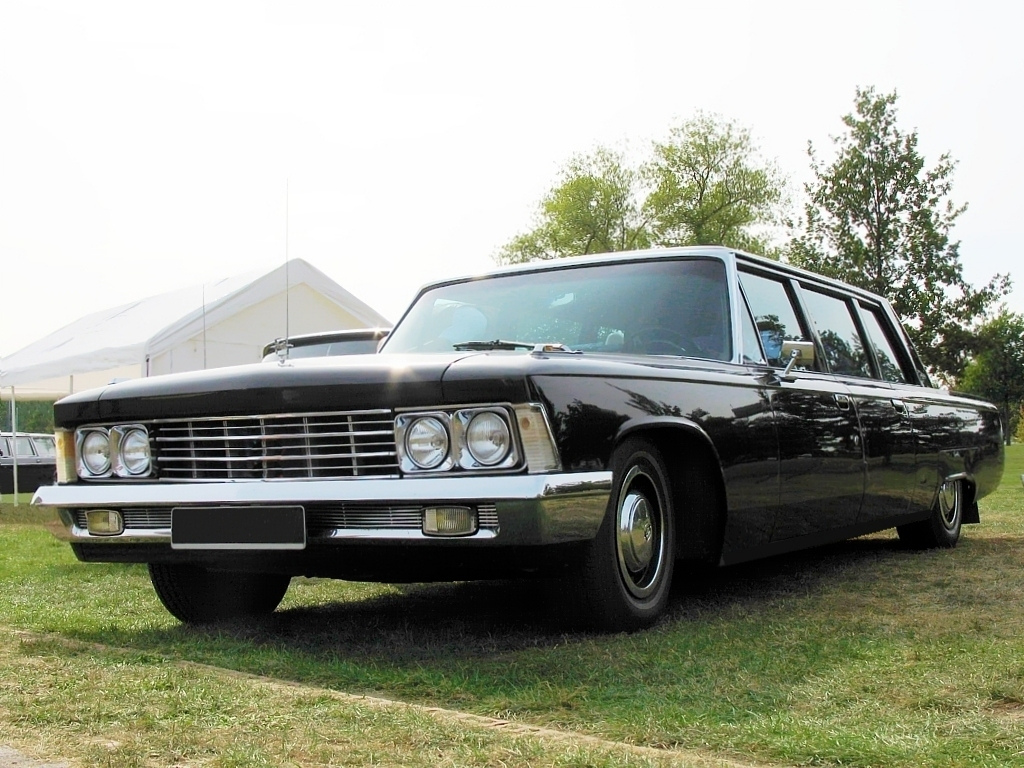

Overview
- Manufacturer: Zavod Imeni Likhacheva
- Production: 1967–1978
- Assembly: Soviet Union: Moscow (Likhachov Plant)

Body and chassis
- Class: Luxury car
- Body style: Limousine
- Layout: FR layout
- Related: ZIL-117

Powertrain
- Engine: 6,959 cc (424.7 cu in) ZIL-114 V8; 300 hp (220 kW) SAE Gross; 559 N⋅m (412.3 lb⋅ft) @ 4400 rpm
- Transmission: 2-speed automatic; 3-speed automatic (from April 1975)

Dimensions
- Wheelbase: 3,880 mm (152.8 in)
- Length: 6,305 mm (248.2 in)
- Width: 2,068 mm (81.4 in)
- Height: 1,540 mm (60.6 in)
- Curb weight: 3,085 kg (6,801 lb)

Chronology
- Predecessor: ZIL-111
- Successor: ZIL-4104

The ZIL-114 is a limousine from the Soviet car manufacturer ZiL introduced in 1970 to replace the ZIL-111 series which was gradually becoming out of date. In almost all respects, the ZIL-114 improved on the 111, 111A and 111G models. The engine, a ZIL-built pushrod V8, was increased in capacity from 5,980 cc (364.9 cu in) to 6,959 cc (424.7 cu in), resulting in an increase of power by 30 percent (to 300 hp SAE Gross at 4400 rpm and 559 N⋅m (57.0 kg⋅m; 412 lb⋅ft) at 2750 rpm) and of maximum speed from approximately 170 km/h (110 mph) to 193 km/h (120 mph). Transmission was two-speed automatic, with hydraulic torque converter. A three-speed gearbox was offered beginning in April 1975.

Front suspension was by torsion bars. Although the rigid rear axle with leaf springs was retained, the ZIL-114 saw the replacement of drums by power-assisted disc brakes (with no fewer than three circuits) on all four wheels to cope with the more powerful engine. It was the first Soviet car with four-wheel disc brakes. It also had a pedal-operated handbrake. There were more luxury appointments than found on previous ZIL models, with such features as air conditioning added to the furnishings of the ZIL-111. Power windows, power door locks, and a remote-control driver's mirror were standard. Measuring 630 cm (250 in) long and weighing 3,085 kg (6,801 lb), it was also equipped with power steering.

The styling was updated somewhat in 1971; with the front end looking similar to that of such cars as the 1966 Imperial but having different shapes and details.

Small numbers of the 114K, with a cutaway roof to allow occupants to stand, were built. Two copies of an ambulance variant, the 114EA, with a sedan delivery body and higher roof, were also built. The ZiL-114N was reskinned with the body panels of its successor, the ZiL-4104.

The 114 continued in limited production until the late 1970s when it was replaced by the even larger and heavier ZIL-4104. About 150 ZiL-114s were produced.

The ZIL-117 was a short-chassis sedan version with only five seats and a much shorter wheelbase. It was also available as an unusual four-door convertible (like the ZIL-111V).

The ZIL-114 was an official state car and transported only members of the Politburo of the Communist Party of the Soviet Union and the top leaders of the country, whereas the shorter ZIL-117 was used by secretaries of the Central Committee, as well as escort vehicles in the motorcade of heads of state, the General Secretary of the Communist Party of the Soviet Union and the head of the Council of Ministers.

In October 1971, the 114 was listed in the Guinness Book of Records as the widest car in production, then from October 1974 to 1976 as the heaviest. A black ZIL-114 is used as the main feature in the video for the world-famous song "Je t'aime" by Lara Fabian.

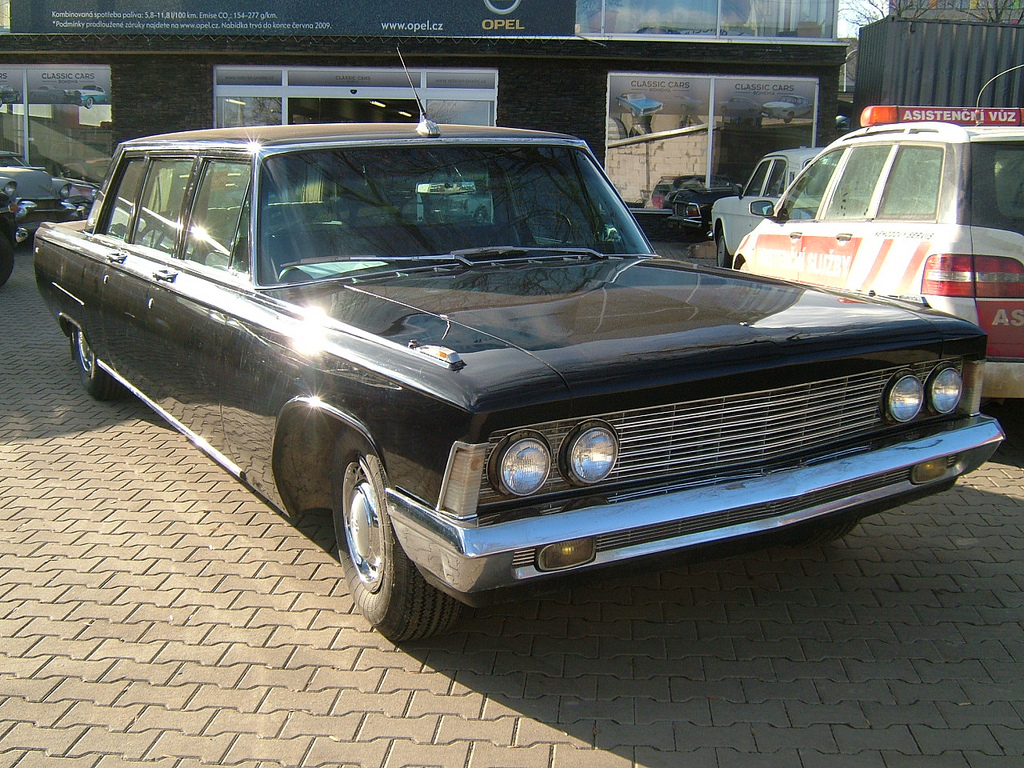
ZiL-114 (1972) with a different chrome grille
