= ZIL-111 =

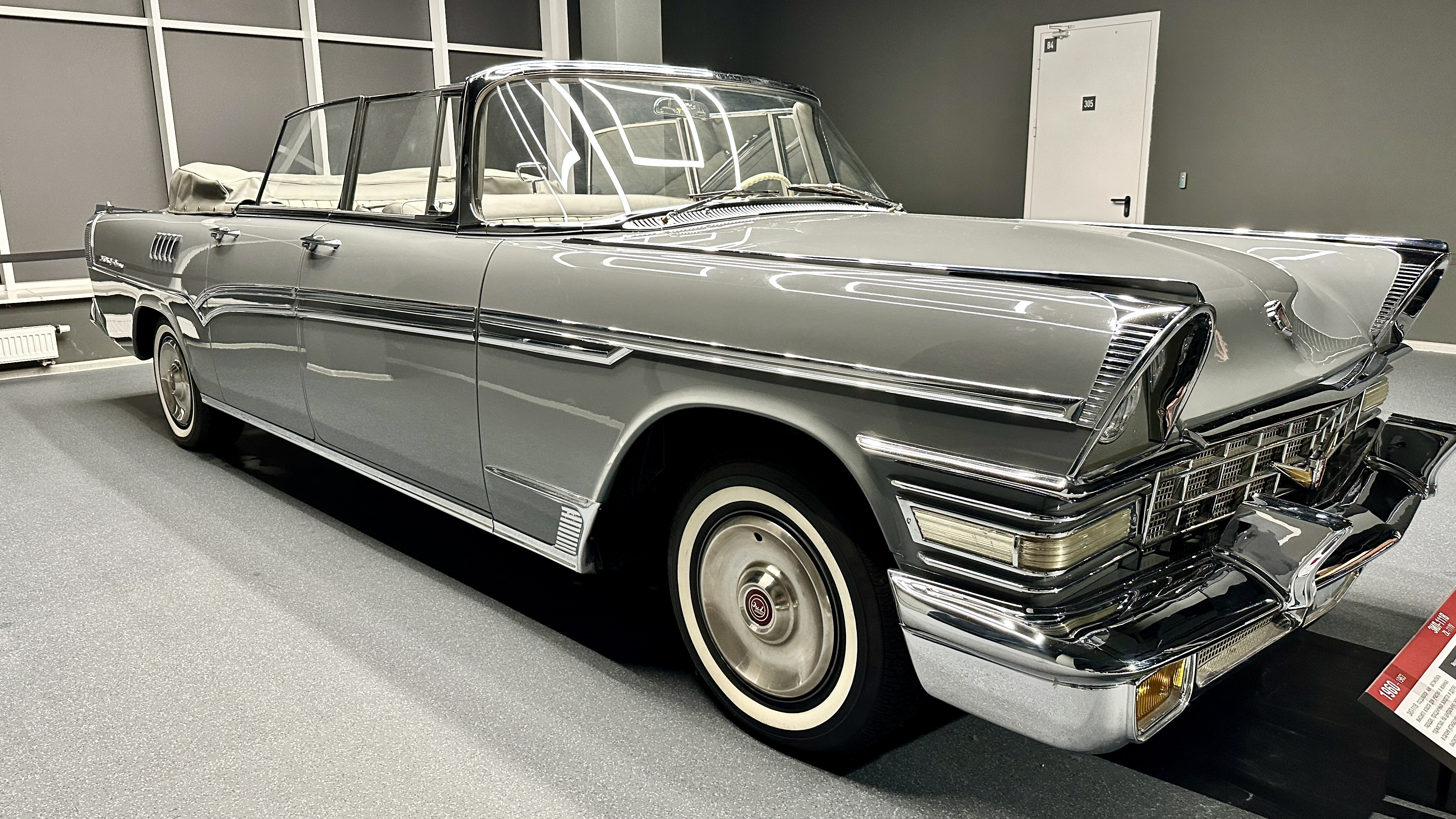
- ZIL-111V

Overview
- Manufacturer: ZIL
- Production: 1958–1962 (ZIL-111); 1962–1967 (ZIL-111G)
- Assembly: Soviet Union: Moscow (Likhachov Plant)

Body and chassis
- Class: Full-size
- Layout: FR layout

Powertrain
- Engine: 6.0 L ZIL-111 V8
- Transmission: 2-speed automatic with a torque converter

Dimensions
- Wheelbase: 3,760 mm (148.0 in)
- Length: 6,137 mm (241.6 in) (ZIL-111); 6,190 mm (243.7 in) (ZIL-111G)
- Width: 2,033 mm (80.0 in) (ZIL-111); 2,045 mm (80.5 in) (ZIL-111G)
- Height: 1,637 mm (64.4 in)
- Curb weight: 2,610–2,815 kg (5,754–6,206 lb)

Chronology
- Predecessor: ZIS-110
- Successor: ZIL-114

The ZIL-111 was a limousine produced by the Soviet car manufacturer ZiL from 1958 to 1967. It was the first post-war limousine designed in the Soviet Union. After tests with the short-lived prototype ZIL-Moscow in 1956, which gained a place in the Guinness Book of Records as the largest passenger car in the world, the ZIL-111 was introduced from ZIL in 1958. The body style was in the American tradition of the time and resembled the mid-1950s cars built by Packard, although, apart from being in tune with current trends, it was an original design and had nothing in common with them, except in general layout. The interiors were trimmed with top quality leather and broadcloth and decorated with thick pile carpet and polished wooden fittings. It featured a comprehensive ventilation and heating system and a 5-band radio, all of which could be controlled from the rear, electric windows, vacuum-operated screen wash, windshield and front door window defrosting. It was powered by a 6.0 L V8 engine producing 200 hp (150 kW) connected to an automatic transmission (similar to that of Chrysler's PowerFlite and influenced by it, but different in design) giving a top speed of 170 km/h (106 mph), hydraulic drum brakes with a vacuum servo booster, coil and wishbone IFS. The car won a top prize at the Brussels Expo World Fair in 1958.

Apart from a basic version ZIL-111, the manufacturer produced ZIL-111A with air conditioning, which had a smaller and flatter rear window due to air tubes, and the convertible ZIL-111V (ЗИЛ-111В in Russian), of which only 12 were built.

In December 1962 the car was completely restyled, now being in tune with the latest trends and having a wide chrome grille with quad headlamps similar to the one used on the 1961 Cadillac Fleetwood Seventy-Five, and was available both as sedan ZIL-111G and convertible ZIL-111D. It was fitted with a 200 hp 5,980 cc (365 cu in) V8. For U.S. President Dwight D. Eisenhower's visit, Yevgeny Molchanov designed a special version of this car. Air conditioning was standard. The ZIL-111G went out of production in 1966. The first ZIL-111D was built in 1963, six months after the new ZIL-111 appeared; only about eight were built, half with grey exteriors, and all were fitted with microphones. Fidel Castro received a ZIL-111D as a gift.

As a rule, the ZIL-111 was available only as state-owned transport for members of the Politburo. About 112 units of all models were made from 1958 to 1967, which 26 of them were ZIL-111Gs.

A minibus based on the ZIL-111, the ZIL-118 Yunost (Youth), was also developed and produced in small numbers.

The ZIL-111 would be replaced in 1967 by the ZIL-114.

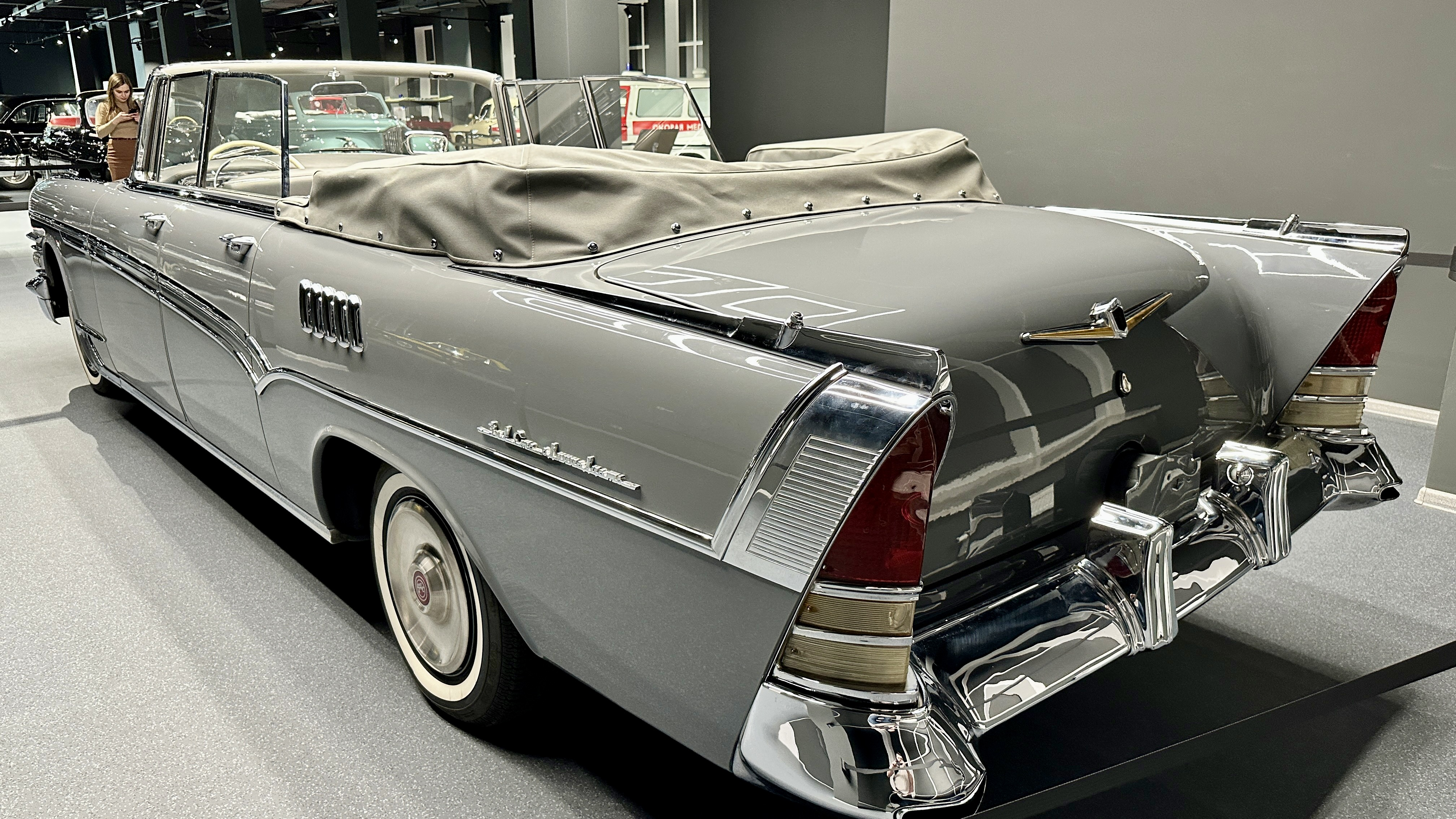
ZIL-111V (rear view)

ZIL-111D (front view)

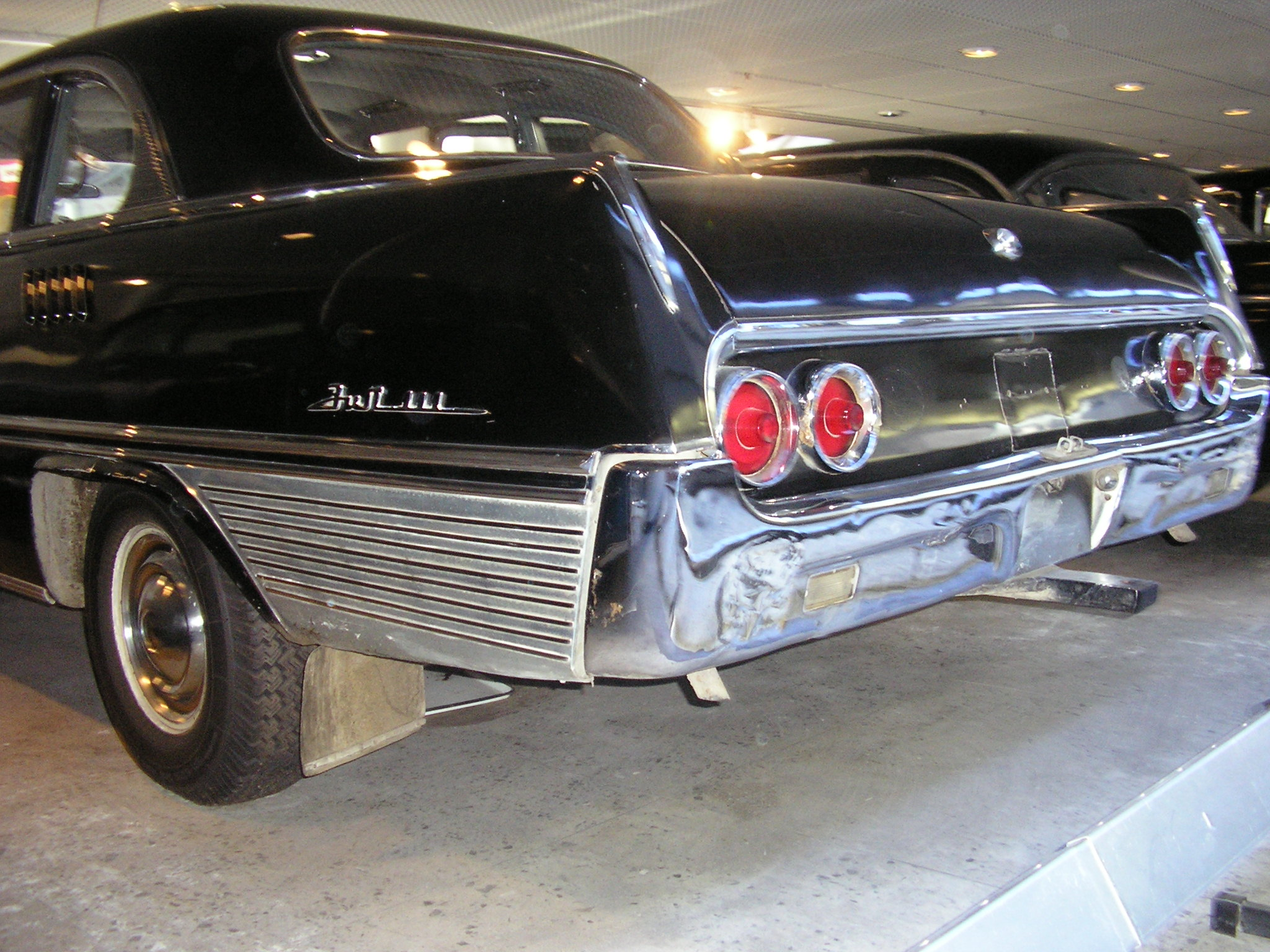
ZIL-111G (rear view)

ZIL-111G (front view)

== Variants ==
- ZIL-111: Original production version.
  - ZIL-111A: ZIL-111 with air conditioning.
  - ZIL-111V: Convertible version.
- ZIL-111G: Modernized ZIL-111.
  - ZIL-111D: Convertible version.
