= ZiL lane =

Road lanes for senior officials

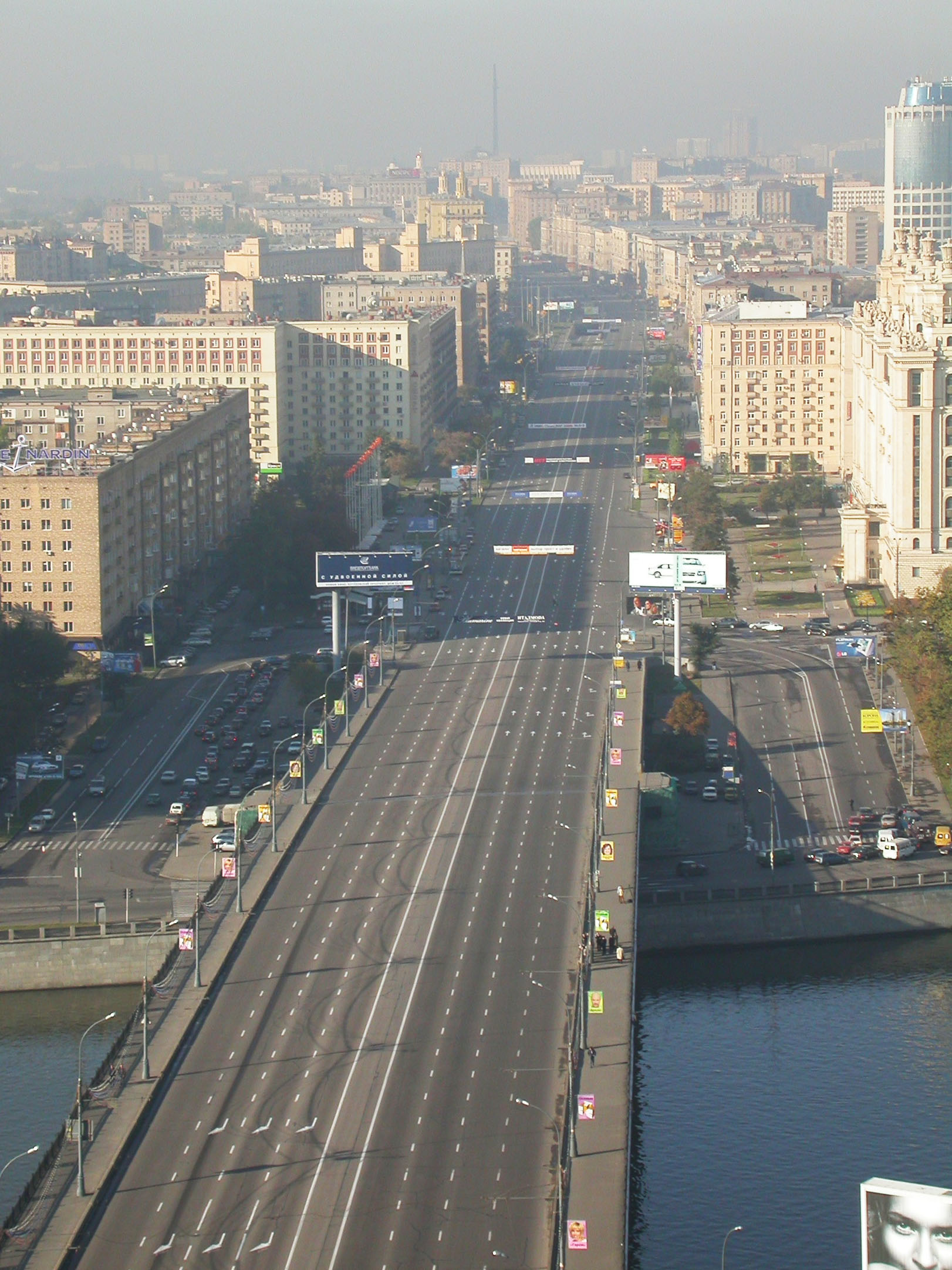
The ZiL lane on Kutuzovsky Prospekt is visible between the two lines in the middle of the road

ZiL lanes (also sometimes called "Chaika lanes") are lanes on some principal roads in Moscow dedicated to vehicles carrying senior government officials. Known officially in Russian as rezervniye polosy ("reserved lanes") notably but not exclusively used by ZiL and Chaika brand limousines transporting high ranking government and military functionaries of the Soviet Union. ZiL lanes emerged in the 1960s during the rule of Leonid Brezhnev, replacing the previous system of having other vehicles flagged down to make way for those of top officials. A two way lane was inserted into the middle of some of Moscow's main highways in place of the central reservations, and were off-limits to all traffic but authorised civilian and emergency service vehicles. ZiL lanes and restricted routes caused considerable disruption to Moscow's traffic because of the absolute priority given to their users. The Guardian's Martin Kettle described the frustration they caused to ordinary motorists in the mid-1980s:

You can spend up to 20 minutes sitting in a lengthening queue on the bridge that crosses the main access road to the Kremlin. The lights are controlled by the Kremlin's own traffic control centre, and other cars simply have to wait. About a kilometre farther down the same road is the Oktyabrskaya Hotel, reserved for guests of the Central Committee. They, too, have a traffic priority, and when the cavalcades are leaving the hotel while the ZiLs are heading into the Kremlin, the whole of central Moscow can grind to a halt.

There were two principal ZiL lanes in Moscow. The one on Leninsky Prospekt was used to shuttle officials to and from Vnukovo International Airport (favoured for government traffic) while the other was on Kutuzovsky Prospekt, en route to the elite residential area of Dorogomilovo District and leading out of the city to the country dachas of the Communist Party elite. The latter was a key part of what was termed the "Government Route", a network of connecting city roads linking the Kremlin with the residences of the members of the nomenklatura. The network was always heavily policed and was off-limits to casual traffic until the late 1960s. The Leninsky Prospekt ZiL lane is no longer used as Vnukovo is no longer the government's preferential airport. However, the Kutuzovsky Prospekt lane continues to exist, and is used by Russia's current political elite who still maintain dachas in Moscow's outskirts, although they nowadays get driven by German luxury cars rather than ZiLs or Chaikas.

== As a pejorative ==
The term was used pejoratively for the games lanes of the Olympic route network in London that were dedicated to vehicles transporting VIPs, athletes and officials during the 2012 Summer Olympics. Regular traffic was blocked from many Olympic Lanes, though local buses could share some of them. Such lanes have been used in other Olympic events, but attracted controversy in London for their disruptive effect on the traffic and because corporate sponsors were also entitled to use the lanes despite not having an operational need.
