= Zil (tribe) =

Tribal confederation of Kurdish tribes

The Zil tribal confederation constitutes a number of Kurmanji (Northern Kurdish) tribes that mostly live within modern Turkey.

== Zil tribes ==
The following is a list of the Kurmanji speaking Kurdish tribes of the Zil tribal Federation

- Ademan
- Burukan
- Celali
- Dakuri/Takori
- Epdoyi
- Hasanan
- Hayderan
- Milan
- Şadili
- Semsi
- Torular
- Zirkan/Zirqan

== Position on the Sheikh Said rebellion ==
The Zil tribal federation didn't join the Sheikh Said rebellion, many tribes fought on the side of the government.

== See also ==
- Sheikh Said rebellion
- Kurdish chiefdoms
- Kurdish tribes
- Kurmanji

== Sources ==
- Uslu, Emrullah (2009). The Transformation of Kurdish Political Identity in Turkey: Impact of Modernization, Democratization and Globalization. pp. 75–. ISBN 978-1-109-05548-1.
- Strohmeier, Martin; Yalçın-Heckmann, Lale (2000). Die Kurden: Geschichte, Politik, Kultur. C.H.Beck. pp. 177–. ISBN 978-3-406-42129-7.
- Olson, Robert (18 December 2013). The Emergence of Kurdish Nationalism and the Sheikh Said Rebellion, 1880–1925. University of Texas Press. pp. 144–. ISBN 978-0-292-76412-5.
- Kehl-Bodrogi, Krisztina; Kellner Heinkele, Barbara; Otter Beaujean, Anke (1997). Syncretistic Religious Communities in the Near East: Collected Papers Of the International Symposium "Alevism in Turkey and Comparable Syncretistic Religious Communities in the Near East in the Past and Present" Berlin, 14-17 April 1955. BRILL. pp. 13–. ISBN 90-04-10861-0.
- Klein, Janet (31 May 2011). The Margins of Empire: Kurdish Militias in the Ottoman Tribal Zone. Stanford University Press. pp. 211–. ISBN 978-0-8047-7570-0.
- al-Jabbār, Fāliḥ ʻAbd; Dawod, Hosham (2003). Tribes and power: nationalism and ethnicity in the Middle East. Saqi. ISBN 9780863568046.
