= ZiL =

Former Russian truck and heavy equipment manufacturer

OJSC AMO-ZiL

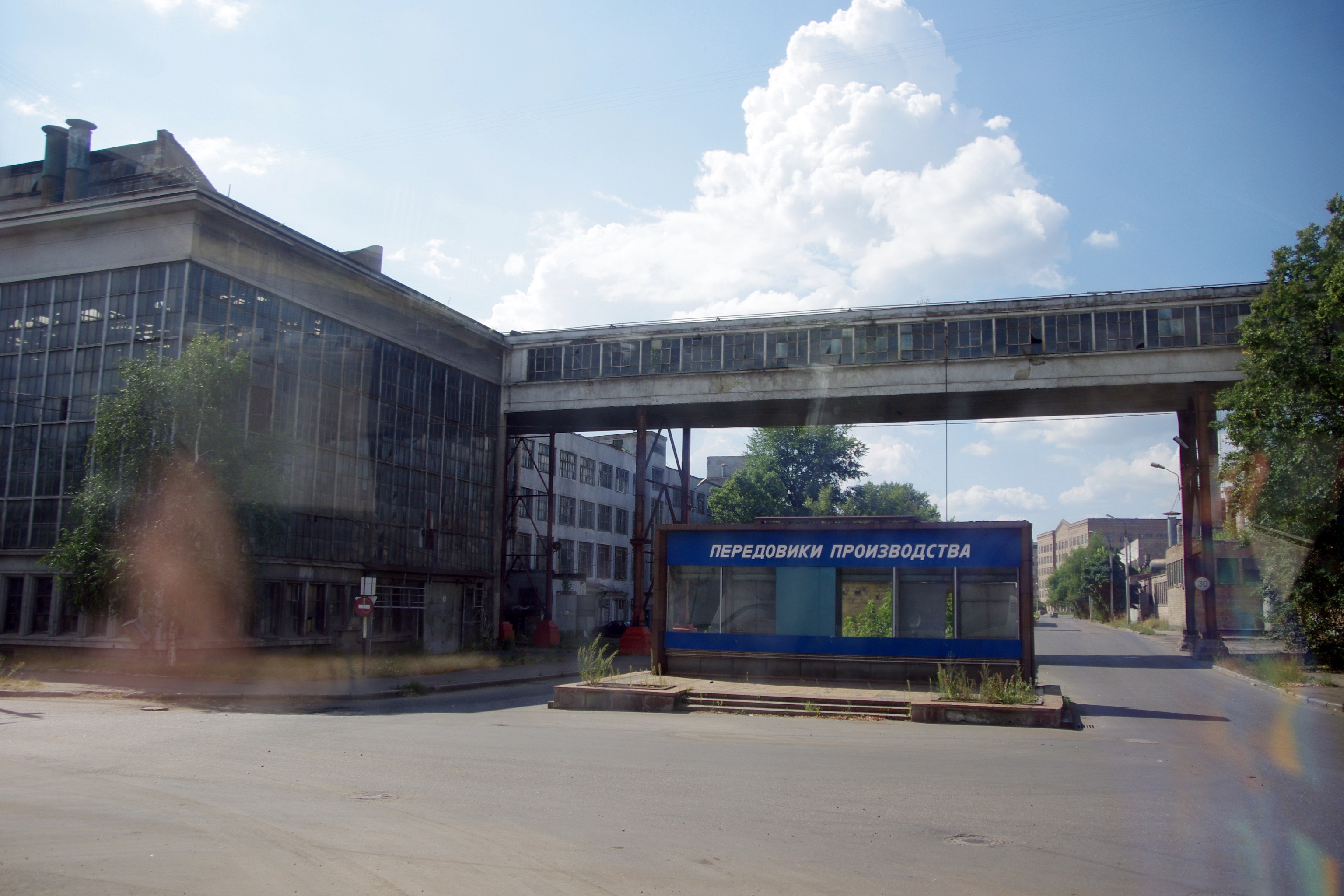
- Former ZiL assembly plant in 2014
- Formerly: AMO (1916–1931); ZiS (1931–1956)
- Type: Joint-stock
- Traded as: MCX: ZILL; MCX: ZILLP
- Industry: Automotive; Defence
- Founded: 1916
- Fate: Production ended in 2012
- Headquarters: Danilovsky District, Moscow, Russia
- Key people: Igor Zakharov (CEO); Konstantin Laptev (General Director, 2002–present)
- Products: Racing cars; Luxury automobiles; Heavy road vehicles; Offroad vehicles; Military vehicles; Buses
- Revenue: $12.1 million (2016)
- Operating income: −$19 million (2016)
- Net income: −$21.5 million (2016)
- Owner: City of Moscow Property Department
- Website: www.amo-zil.ru

Public Joint-Stock Company – Likhachov Plant (OJSC AMO ZiL; Russian: Публичное акционерное общество – Завод имени Лихачёва, romanized: Publichnoye aktsionernoye obshchestvo – Zavod imeni Likhachyova), commonly known as ZiL (ЗиЛ), was an automobile manufacturer based in Danilovsky District of Moscow, Russia from 1916 to 2012. It is best known for producing limousines used by the elite of the Soviet Union which led the company to become the namesake of the ZiL lanes.

ZiL was founded to assemble and repair American and Italian vehicles in Russia, but by the 1950s had expanded to produce domestic automobiles, trucks, military vehicles, and heavy equipment. ZiL's limousines were popular with the nomenklatura of Communist Party and it became one of the main producers of luxury cars in the Soviet Union. ZiL was privatised after the dissolution of the Soviet Union but growing unprofitability led the company to cease automobile production, with the last ZiL vehicle being assembled in 2012, and its liquidation as an automobile manufacturer by 2020. ZiL continues to exist legally as a real estate development company for the former factory site in Moscow, on which a new urban district will be built by the LSR Group.

== History ==
On 2 August [O.S. 20 July] 1916 the Moscow Automotive Society (AMO) (Russian: Автомобильное Московское Общество, romanized: Avtomobilnoe Moskovskoe Obshchestvo), started to build a factory in Tyufeleva Grove south of Moscow, inside a meander of the Moskva River. The modern building, completed in 1917 just before the Russian Revolution, had the latest in American equipment and an intended staff of 6,000 workers. Plans envisioned the production of Fiat F-15 1.5-ton trucks under licence in 1917, but because of the October Revolution of November 1917 and the subsequent Russian Civil War of 1917 to 1923, the factory produced its first vehicle, the AMO-F-15, on 1 November 1924. The AMO-F-15 was shown at a parade on 7 November 1924.

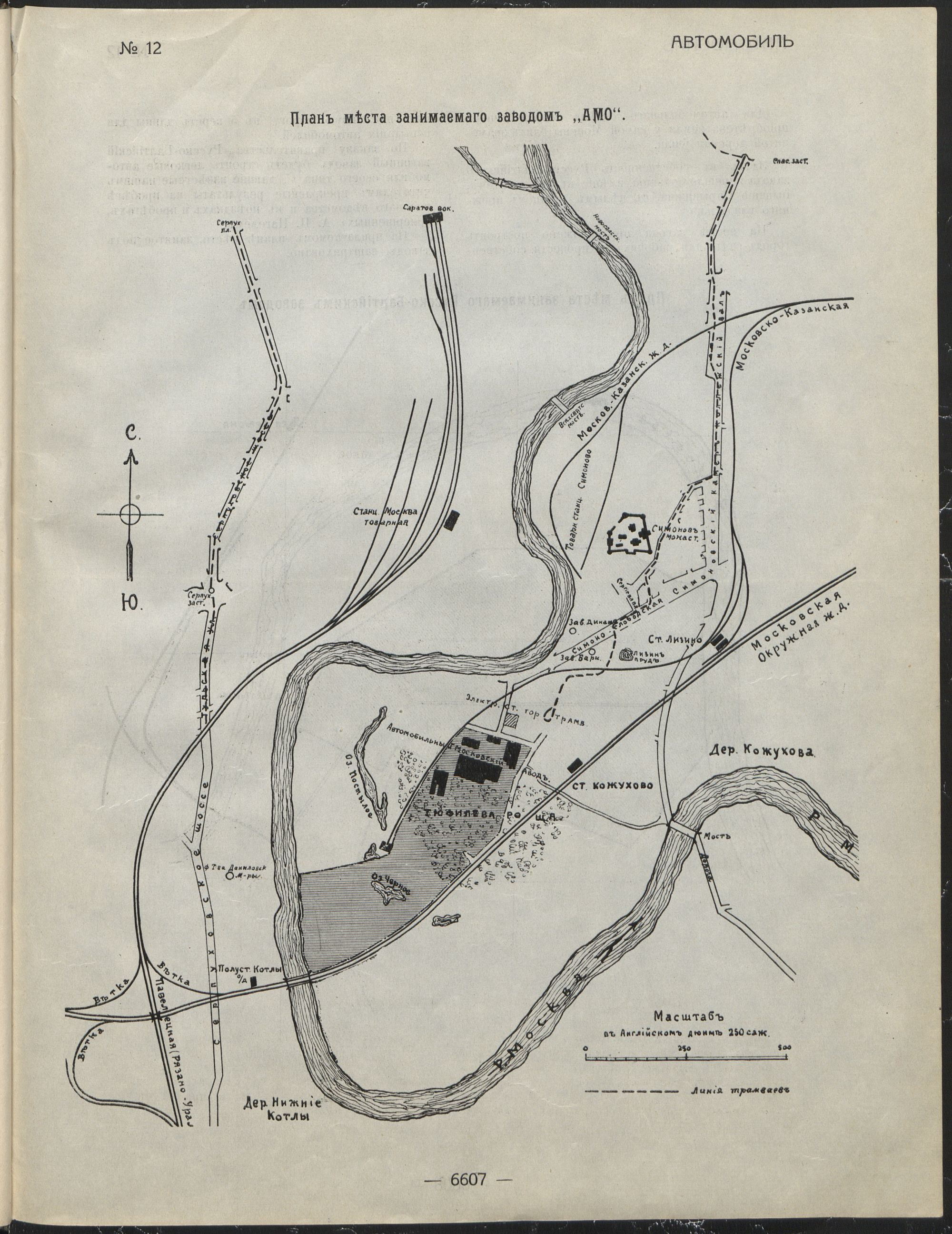
The 1916 plan for the AMO factory

Nevertheless, the factory still managed to assemble trucks bought from Italy from 1917 to 1919. On 30 April 1923, the factory was named after Italian anarchist Pietro Ferrero, but in 1925 was renamed as "First National Automobile Factory" (Russian: 1-й Государственный автомобильный завод, romanized: '1-y Gosudarstvennyy avtomobil'nyy zavod). In 1927 Ivan Likhachev became the Director of the factory. In April 1929, it was agreed on to expand the plant to build Autocar 2.5-ton truck models.

From 1929 to 1931, the ZiL factory was re-equipped and expanded with the help of the American company A.J. Brandt Co.. The factory name changed on 1 October 1931 name to Automotive Factory No. 2 (Zavod Imeni Stalina) (ZIS or ZiS), in honour of then-Soviet leader Joseph Stalin. In the 1930s, facilities were modernised, which allowed the factory to manufacture vehicles with parts that were domestically designed in the Soviet Union, rather than purely licensed and imported models.

Following the Axis invasion of the Soviet Union in June 1941, the ZIS plant was soon evacuated to new facilities in cities further east, including Ulyanovsk, Chelyabinsk, Miass, and Shadrinsk. These factories continued to manufacture automobiles as separate entities after the end of the war in 1945. The ZIS plant began manufacturing refrigerators in 1950. ZIS was a major provider of training, tooling, and technical support for the establishment of First Automotive Works in 1953, as part of Soviet assistance to the People's Republic of China. The Jiefang CA-10, based on the Soviet ZIS-150, was the first Chinese-produced truck; it began production in 1956.

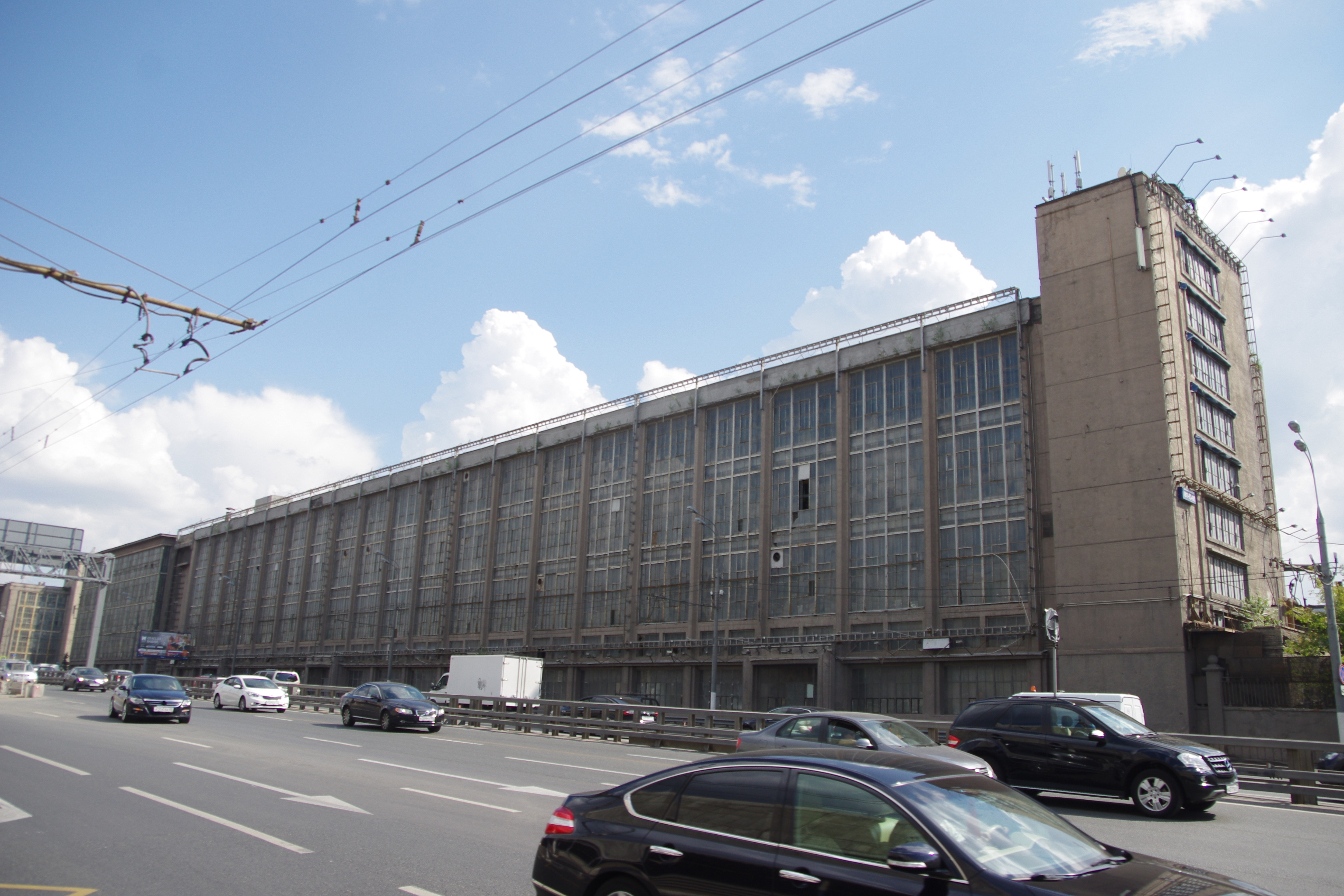
Plant buildings facade at Avtozavodskaya street, demolished in 2014

On 26 June 1956, during the de-Stalinization period, the factory's name changed again to Zavod imeni Likhachyova ("Factory named after Likhachev") after its former director Ivan Likhachev (director from 1926 to 1939 and from 1940 to 1950, died on 24 June 1956). ZiL had a history of exporting trucks to Cuba; this trade resumed in the early-21st century.

By the mid-1970s, ZiL was struggling to compete as a truck-manufacturer with the newly-built KAMAZ plant located in Naberezhnye Chelny in Tatarstan. The ZIL-130 was severely outdated and its main development project, the ZIL-170, was transferred to KAMAZ. Production of the ZIL-133, a modernised version of the ZIL-130 with a 3-axle configuration, began in 1975 to hold over until a new model could be produced. ZiL began concentrating on development of the ZIL-169, which featured a brand new engine designed in-house at the factory. However, testing found serious flaws with the new transmission, which had to be redesigned. Delays meant that the earliest examples of the ZIL-169 were only produced in 1985, and preparations for full-scale production finished only just before the 1991 collapse of the Soviet Union.

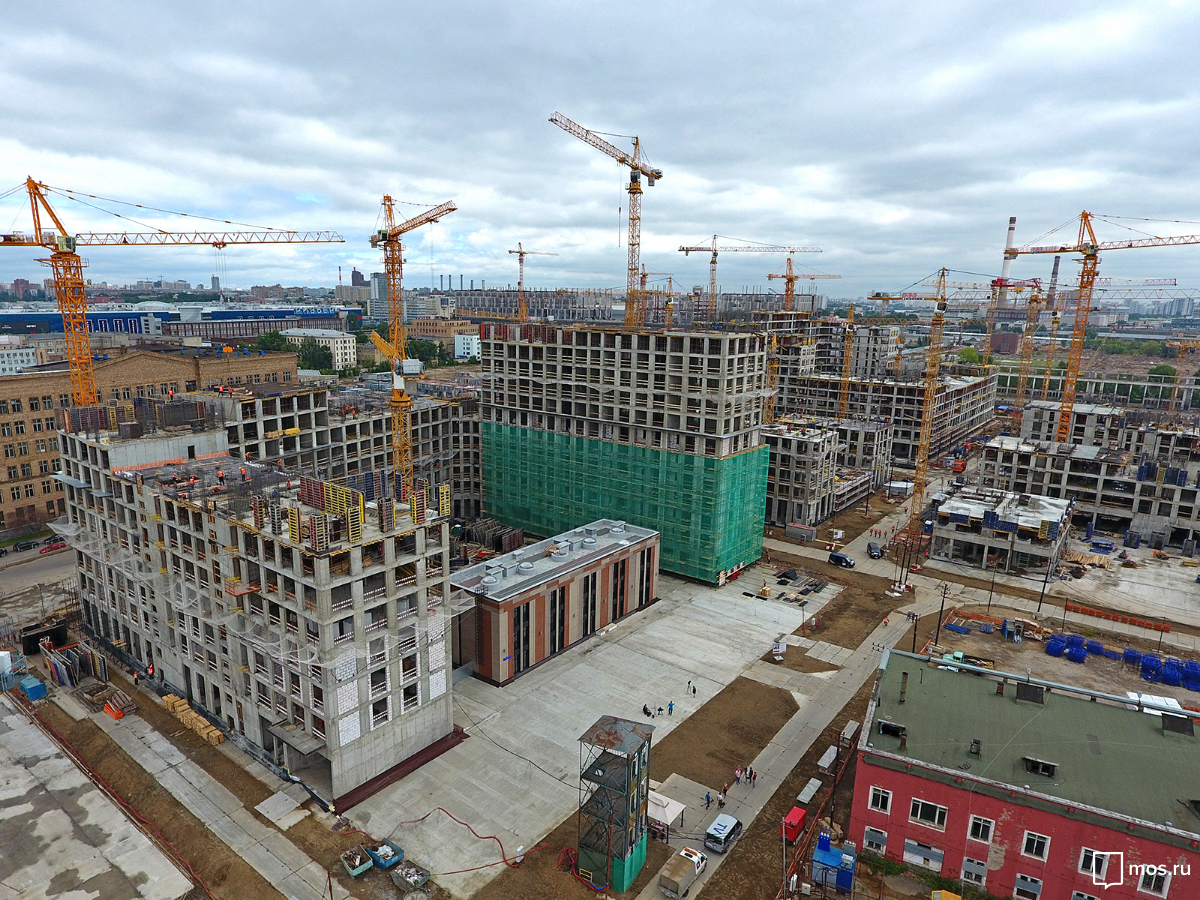
Comprehensive development of the territory of ZIL (July 2016).

ZiS luxury vehicles

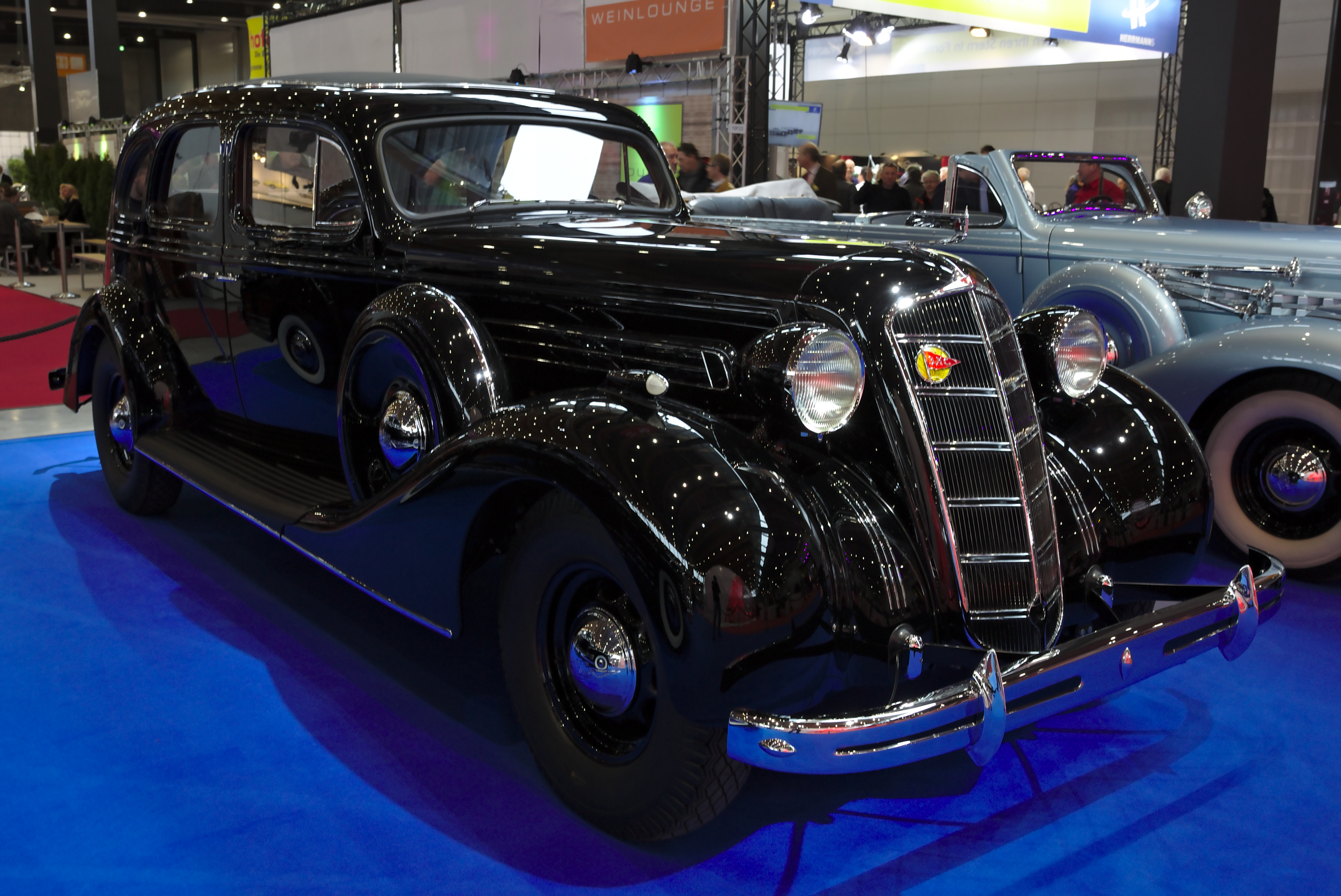
ZIS-101 (1936)

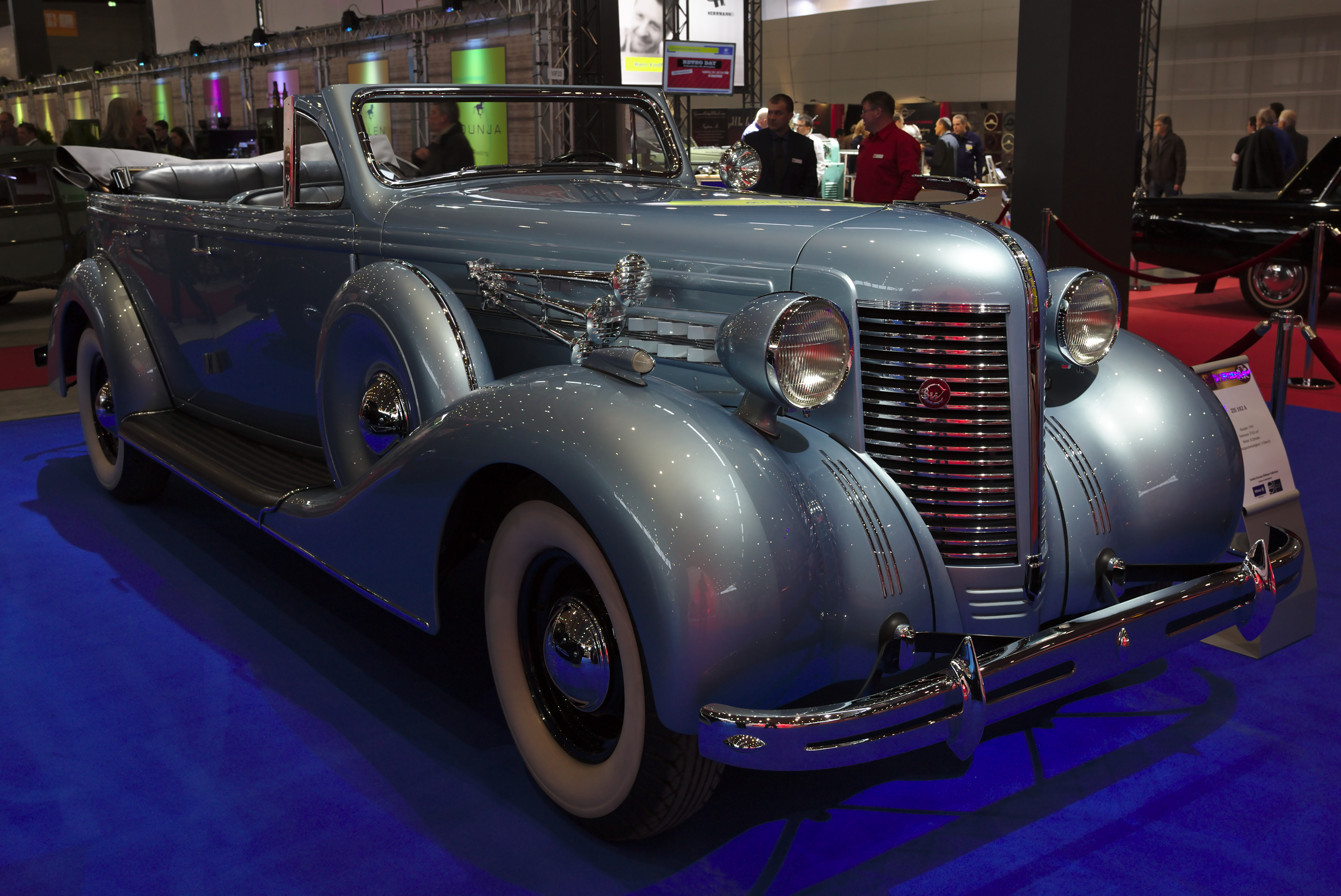
ZIS-102 (1937)

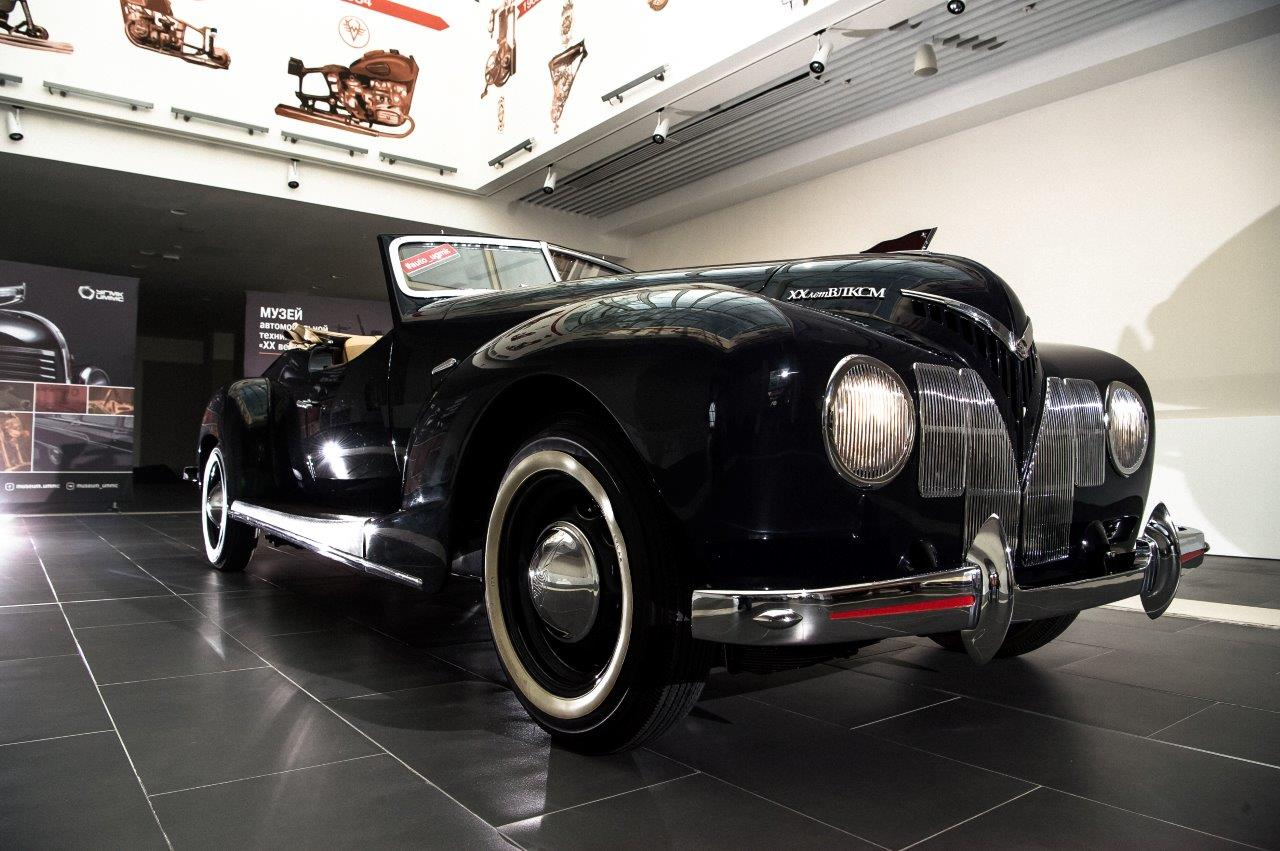
ZIS-101A Sport (1939)

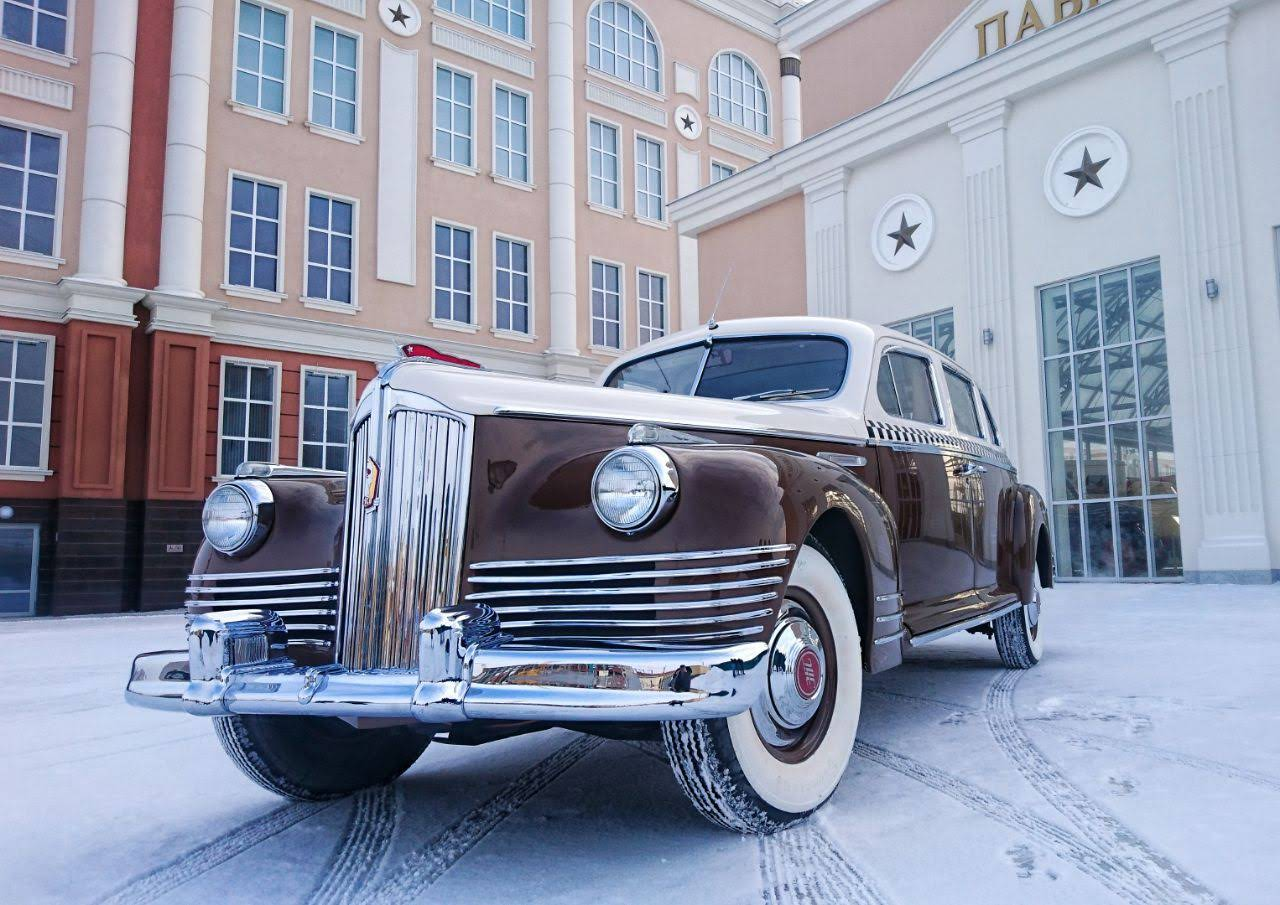
ZIS-110 (1945)

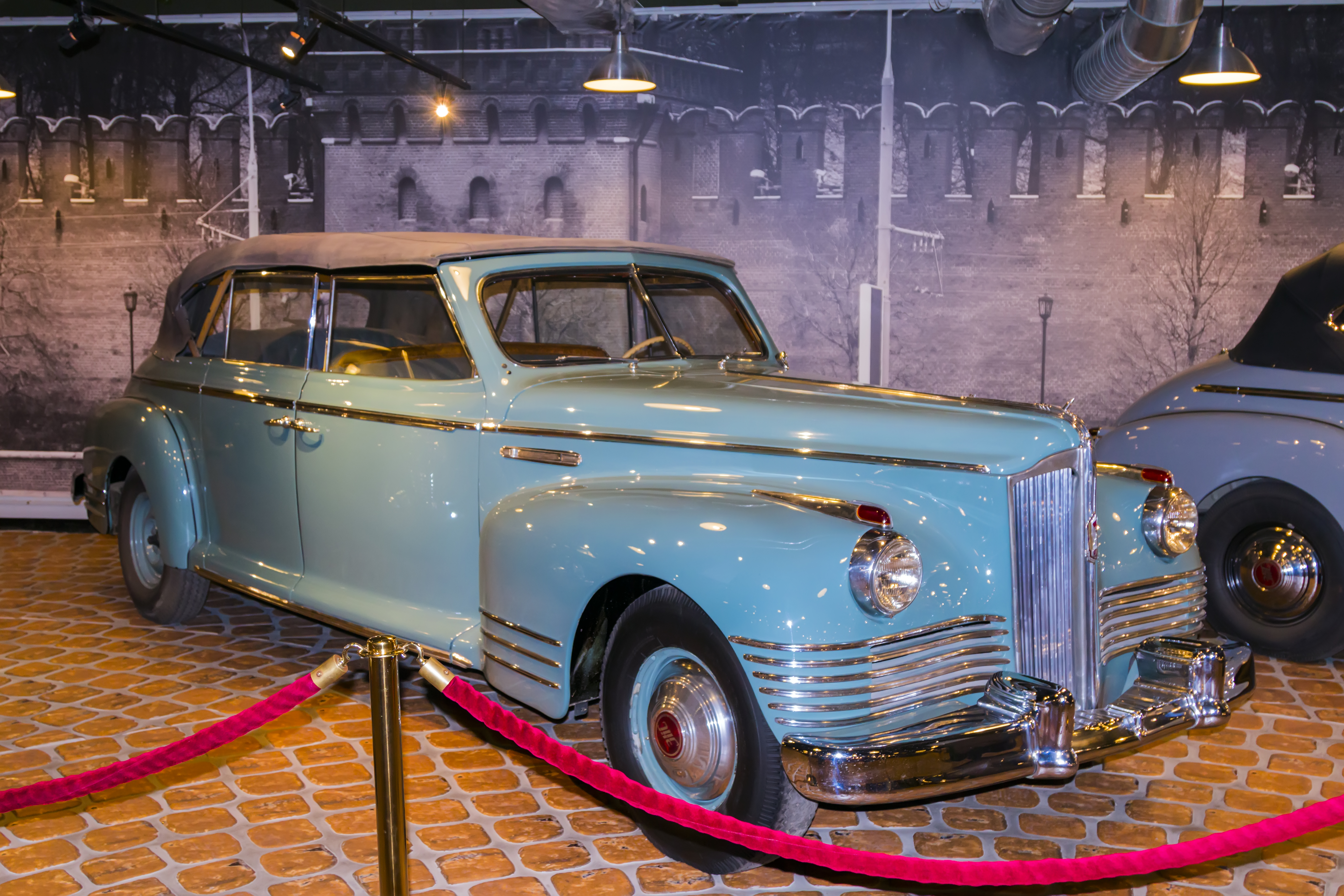
ZIS-110B (1949)

== Limousines ==
ZiL became associated with the production of luxury cars, despite being primarily a manufacturer of trucks, beginning with the ZIS-101 in 1936. Initially based on American cars, a number of executive car and limousine models of increasingly Soviet design were produced over time. ZiL limousines quickly became very popular with the nomenklatura – the elite of the ruling Communist Party of the Soviet Union. The ZiL limousines were the official car that carried the Soviet heads of state, and many Soviet Union allied leaders, to summits or in parades. The limousines were flown to international summits as, for example, in 1987 and 1990 to Washington, D.C. in the US for Mikhail Gorbachev's official state visits.

ZiL lanes, road lanes dedicated to vehicles carrying top Soviet officials, received their nicknames from the frequent sight of ZiL cars in them.

ZiL luxury vehicles

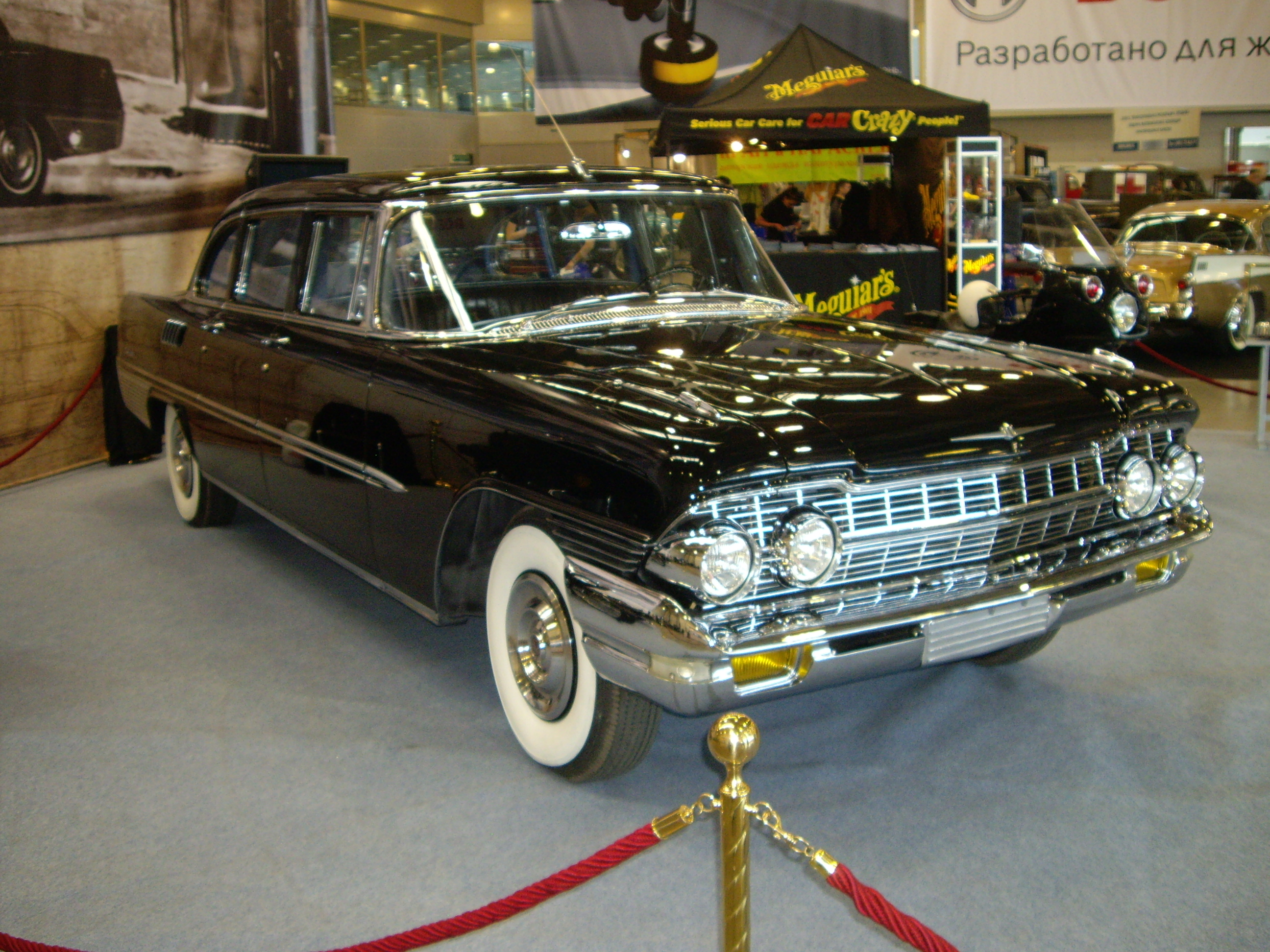
ZIL-111G (1962)

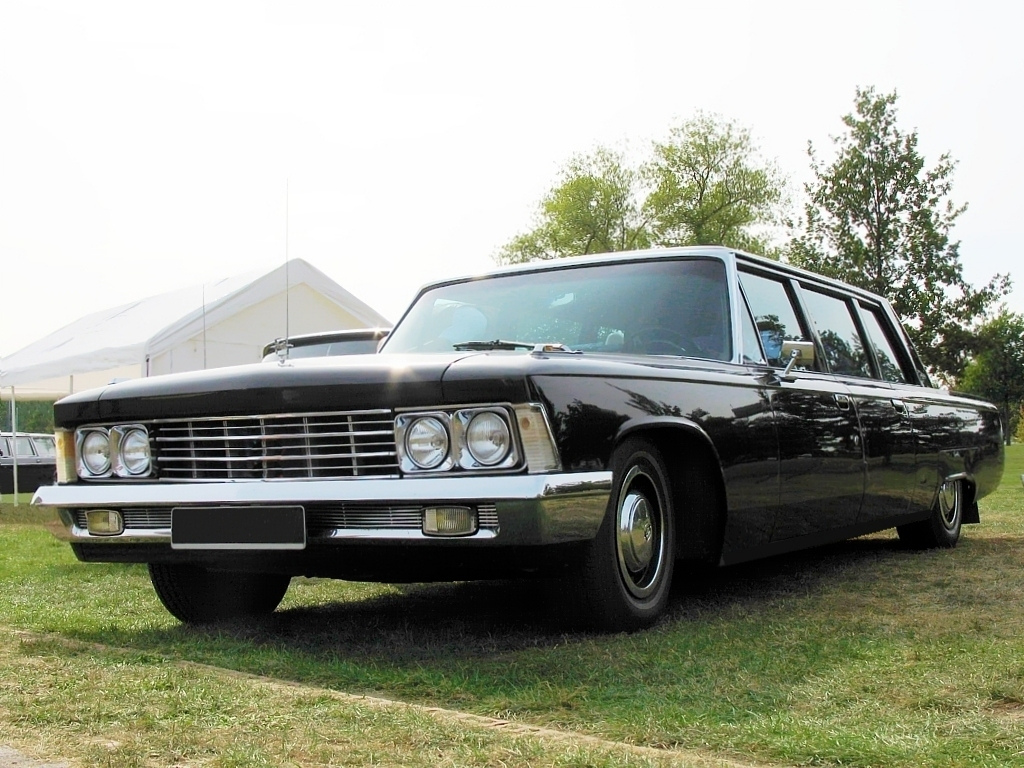
ZIL-114 (1967)

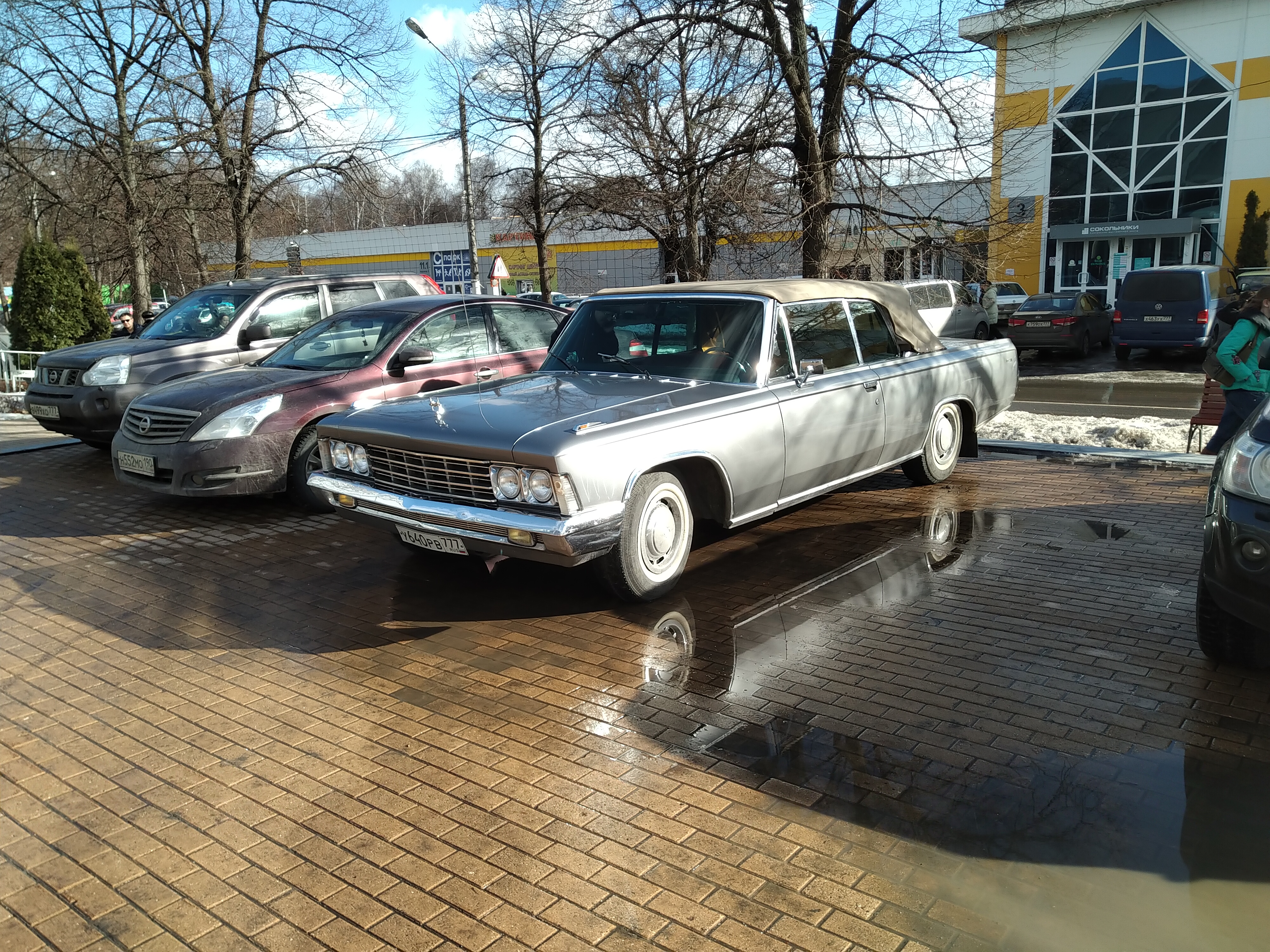
ZIL-117 convertible (1971)

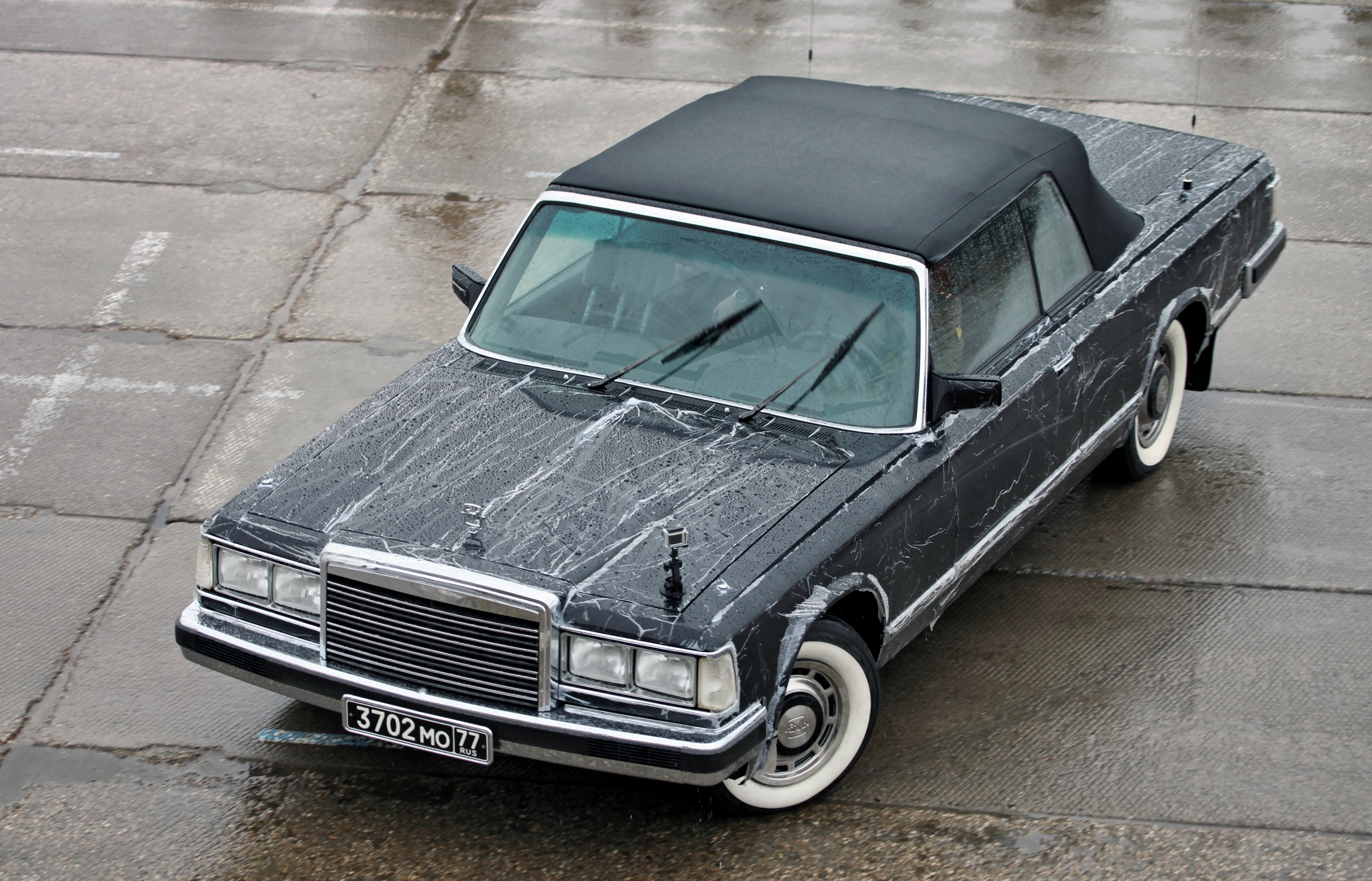
ZIL-4104 convertible (1981)

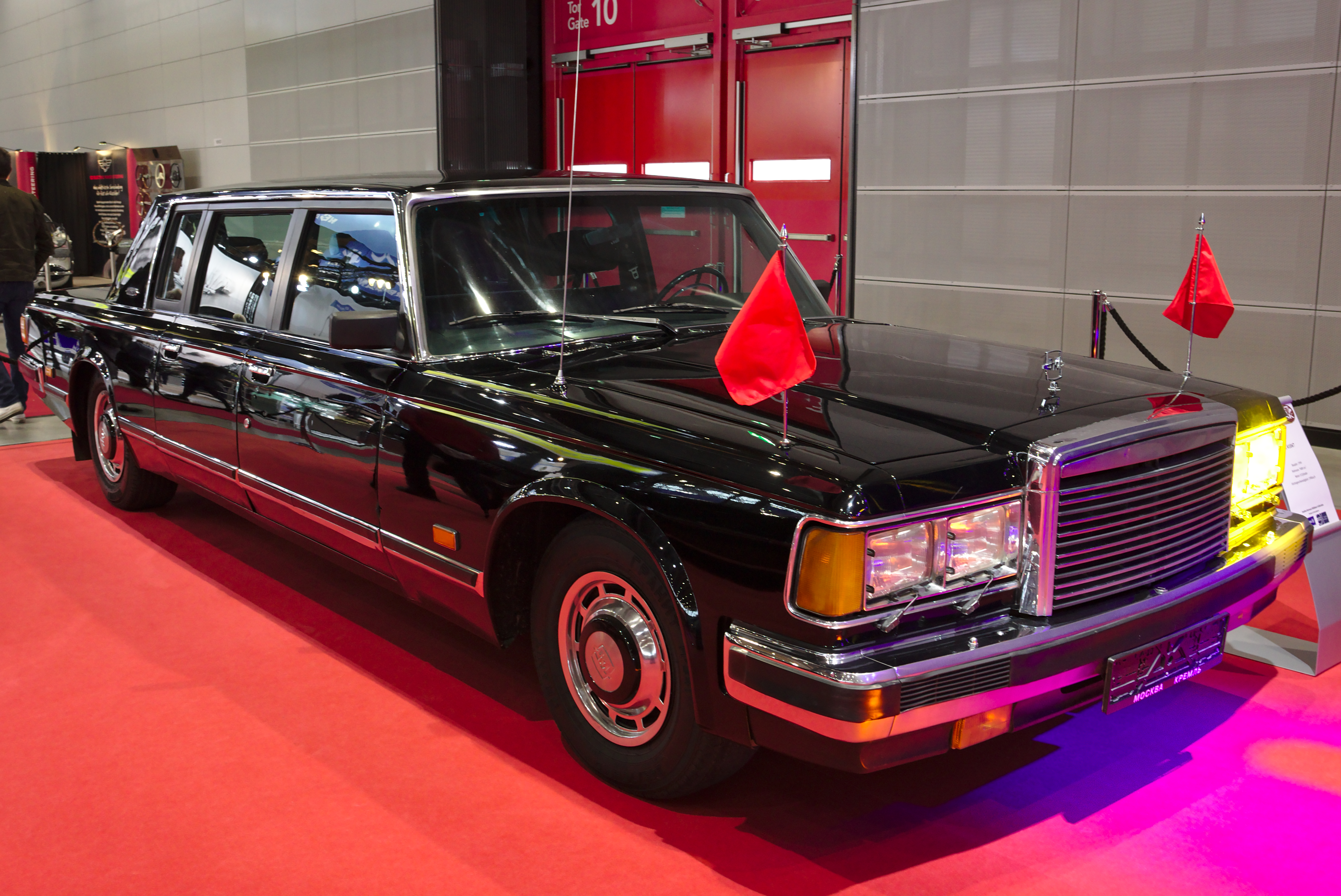
ZIL-41047 (1985)

After the final ZiL limousine was built in 2012, the Moscow factory administration stopped truck production and the company was declared bankrupt in 2013. ZiL still exists as a legal entity, but produces no vehicles. In 2014 it was announced that the factory site will be turned into a residential development. Most factory buildings were dismantled in 2015.

The factory's equipment and other automotive assets were auctioned off to a new company, "MSTs6 AMO ZIL". It employs 47 staff, mostly former ZiL workers. The company took part in the Moscow International Automobile Salon 2016.

After the building of "MSTs6 AMO ZIL" was demolished in 2020, it was believed that the company ceased to exist. However, it was reported in 2021 that MSTs6 continued to operate. Its staff and equipment were moved to the Moscow Oblast.

== Owners and management ==
In 2003, ZiL was transferred to the management of the Moscow Automobile Company ("MAC"), a subsidiary of the Center for Investment Projects and Programs ("CIPP"), which specializes in management consulting, crisis management and the organization of project financing.

== Media ==
The ZiL factory is portrayed in a number of English language documentaries. The 2001 documentary by Daniel Leconte, Lenin if you knew (renamed USSR Memories), follows the fate of a family associated with the factory as well as the factory itself in the 1990s. The factory is also a feature of the 2014 documentary, The Last Limousine.

== Awards ==
- In June 1942 the VMS was awarded the first Order of Lenin for the excellent organization of the production of ammunition and weapons.
- In October 1944 the plant was awarded the Order of Red Banner of Labour.
- In 1971 the plant was awarded the Order of Lenin for the third successful implementation of the Eighth Five-Year Plan.
- In 1975 the plant was awarded the Order of the October Revolution for the successful completion of works on creation of capacities up to 200 thousand cars per year issuance.

== See also ==
- List of ZiL vehicles
- Soviet Artillery Factory No. 92 — also named Zavod imeni Stalina (ZiS).
- GM "old-look" transit bus: Soviet versions — ZiS-154 and ZiS-155 models.

== Literature ==
- Straus, Kenneth M. (1998). Factory and Community in Stalin's Russia: The Making of an Industrial Working Class. University of Pittsburgh Press. p. i. ISBN 978-082298584-6.
- Sutton, Antony C. (1973). National Suicide: Military Aid to the Soviet Union. New Rochelle, N.Y.: Arlington House. ISBN 978-087000207-6.
