= ZIL-41047 =

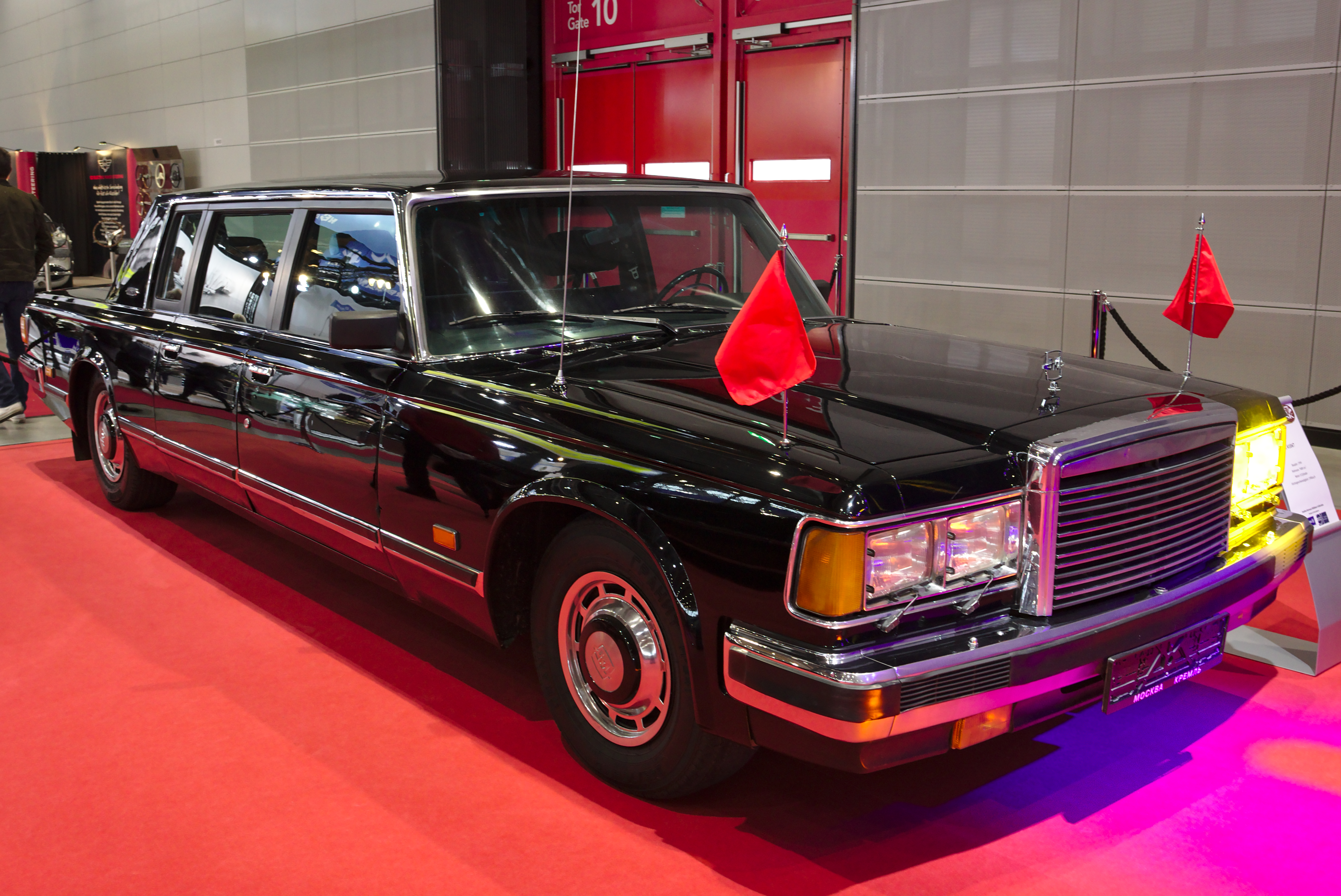

Overview
- Manufacturer: Zavod Imeni Likhacheva
- Production: 1985–2010; 234 built
- Assembly: Soviet Union / Russia: Moscow (Likhachov Plant)

Body and chassis
- Class: Luxury car
- Body style: Limousine (ZIL-41047); Saloon (ZIL-41041); Convertible (ZIL-41044); Ambulance (ZIL-41042)
- Layout: FR layout

Powertrain
- Engine: 7.7L ZIL-4104 V8
- Transmission: 3-speed automatic

Dimensions
- Wheelbase: 3,300 mm (129.9 in) (ZIL-41041); 3,880 mm (152.8 in) (ZIL-41047)
- Length: 5,750 mm (226.4 in) (ZIL-41041); 6,339 mm (249.6 in) (ZIL-41047)
- Width: 2,086 mm (82.1 in)
- Height: 1,500 mm (59.1 in)
- Curb weight: 3,030 kg (6,680 lb) (ZIL-41041); 3,400 kg (7,500 lb) (ZIL-41047)

Chronology
- Predecessor: ZIL-117 (ZIL-41041); ZIL-4104/41045 (ZIL-41047); ZIL-4105/41051 (ZIL-41052)
- Successor: ZIL-4112R (ZIL-41047)

The ZIL-41047 is a limousine built by ZIL in Russia, although the production of models ceased in 2010 due to their customer base turning to more modern Western vehicles.

== Description ==
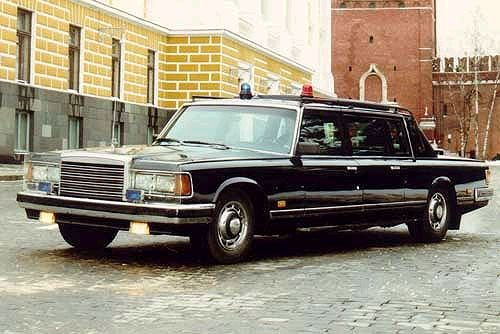
"72 Scorpion" version for presidential guards

The ZIL has seven seats including the driver, the top speed with two people is listed as "no less than 190 km/h (118 mph)". It is powered by a 7.7 L (470 cu in) carbureted V8 engine producing 315 hp (235 kW) and 610 Nm (450 lb-ft) of torque, which drives the rear wheels via a three-speed automatic transmission with the following ratios.

- First gear: 2.02:1
- Second gear: 1.42:1
- Third gear: 1:1
- Reverse: 1.42:1

It replaced the ZIL-4104 in 1985 and had virtually no mechanical changes compared with that model. The only major changes have been in the styling, which in some respects, notably in the rear-view mirrors, was subtly modernised compared to the styling of previous ZIL models. The front turn indicators were also modernised, with the rectangular "horizontal line" giving way to a more vertically oriented, "door-like" shape. The front headlights were also restyled, as was the rear parcel shelf.

== Variants ==
- ZIL-41047 (1985–2002) — Base model with seven seats and 3880 mm (152.75 inches) wheelbase
- ZIL-41041 (1986–2000) — Five-seat saloon, 3300 mm (130 inches) wheelbase - 30 cars made, 12 of them in 1997-2000 for the Government of Moscow
- ZIL-41042 — Ambulance
- ZIL-41044 — Convertible
- ZIL-41049 — Special communication car
- ZIL-41052 (1988–2002) — Armoured limousine
- ZIL-4107 (1988–1999) — Special communication car
- ZIL-41071 — Special communication car
- ZIL-41072 "Scorpion" (1989–1999) — Escort car
- ZIL-4104R (1990) — Film car
- ZIL-41047TB (1992) — Armoured limousine (2 made)
- ZIL-410441 (2010) — Three cars in black for the Victory Day parade on Red Square
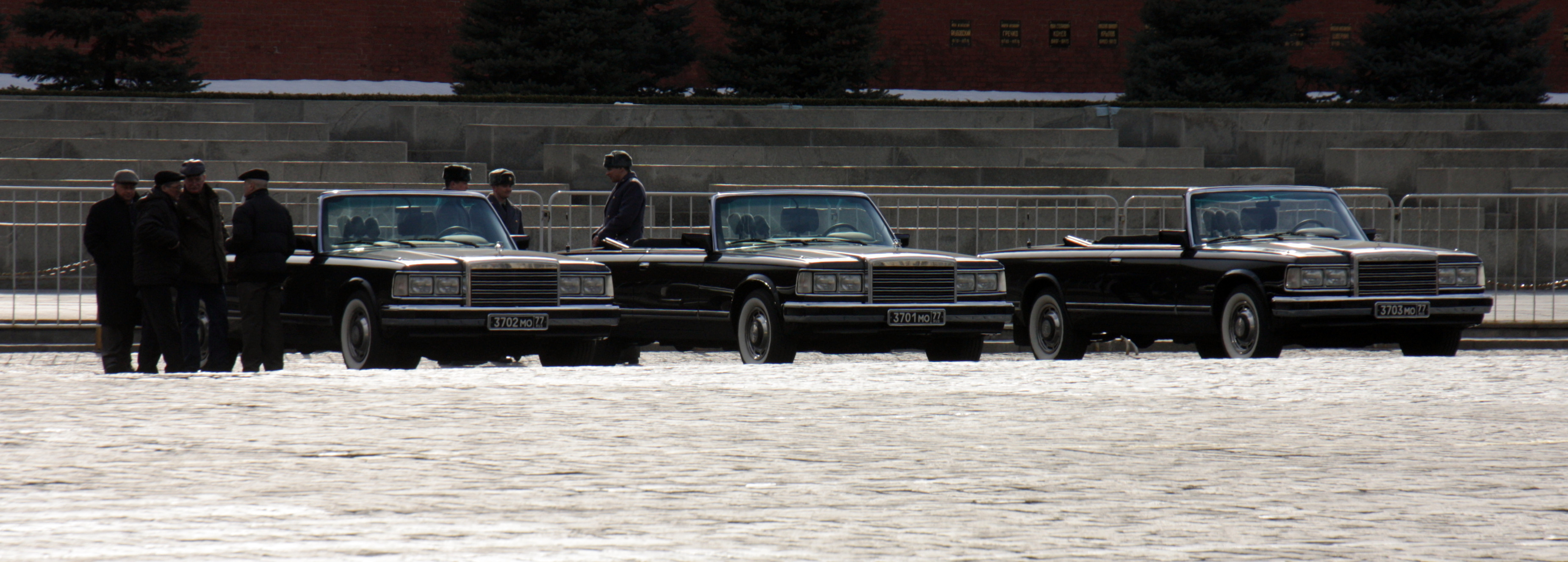
Three ZIL-410441, parked on the Red Square

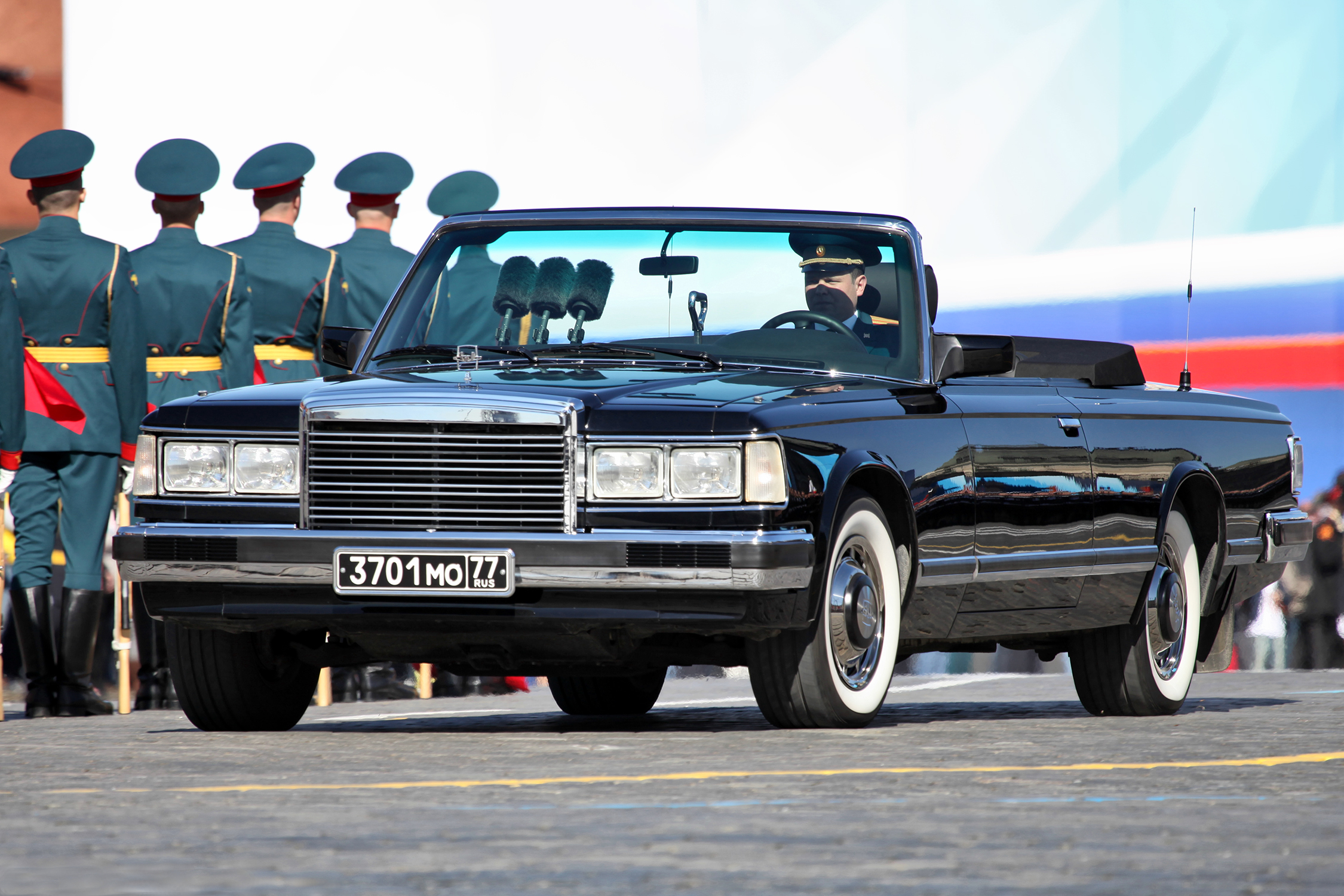
ZIL-410441 on the Red Square

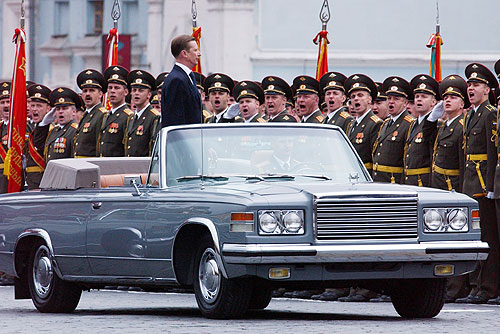
Ex-Defense Minister of Russia Sergei Ivanov standing in a ZIL-41044 at the 2004 Moscow Victory Day Parade

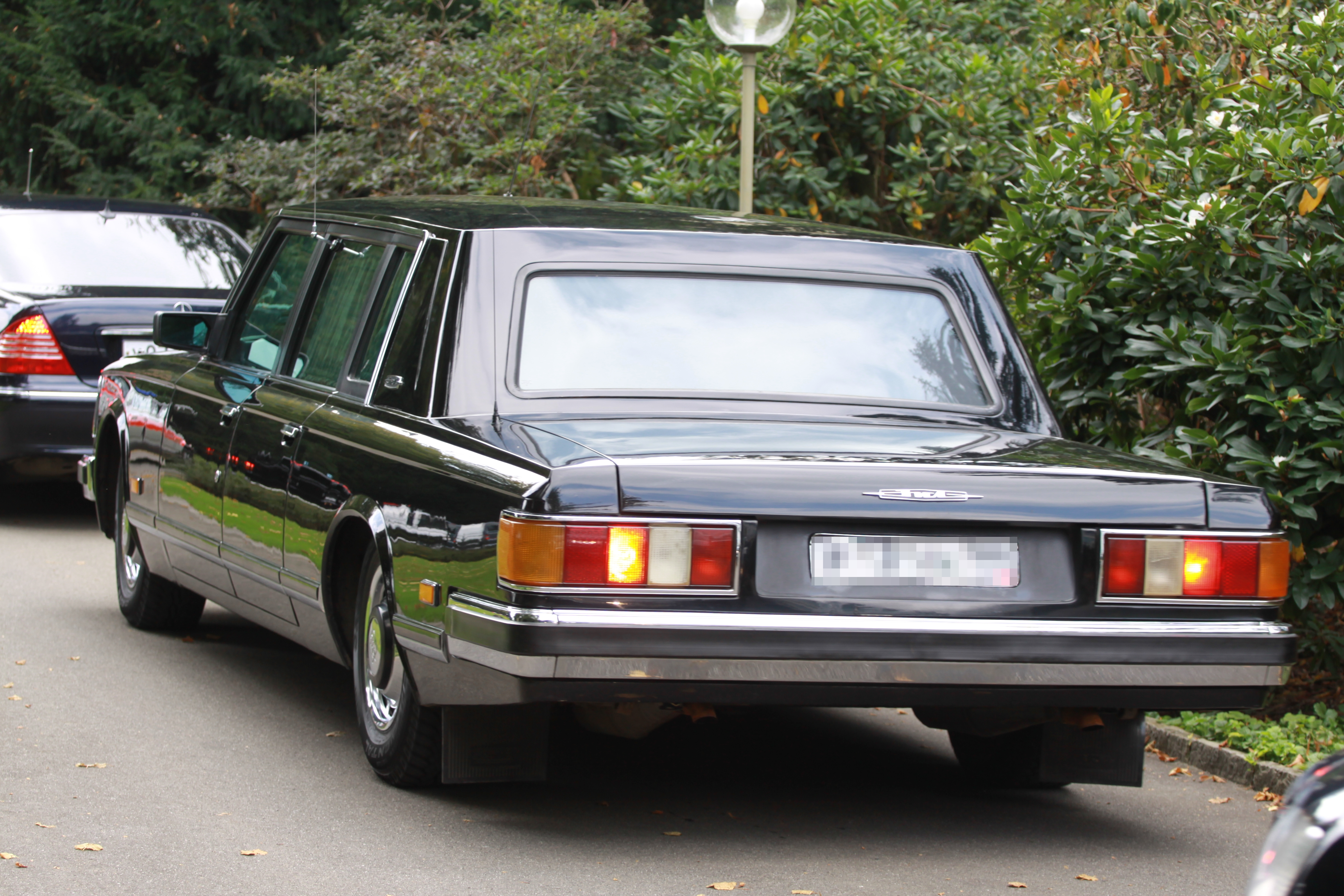
ZIL-41052 used by the Russian president Dimitri Medvedev in Bern, Switzerland, in 2009

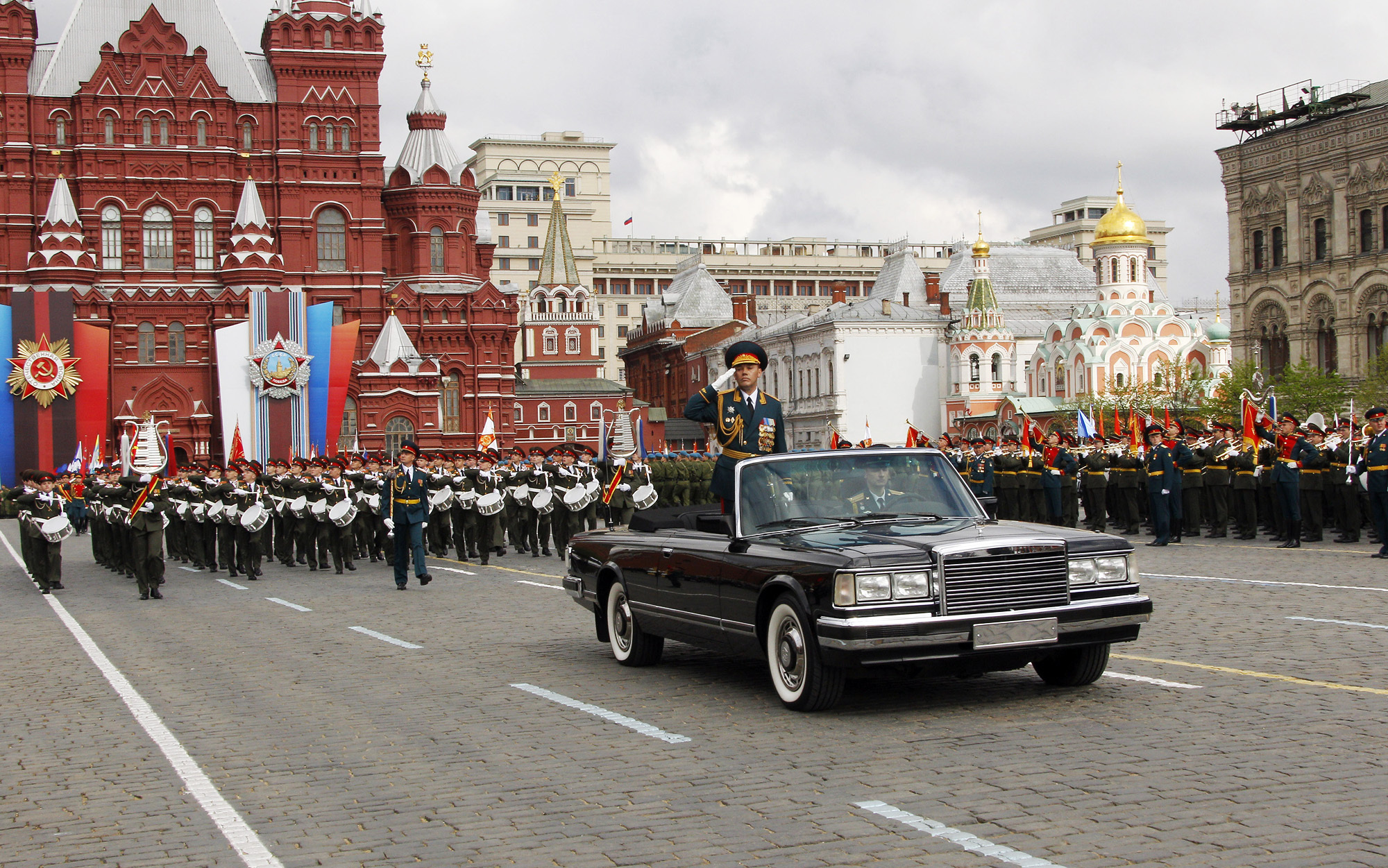
ZIL-410441 parading in Moscow on Victory Day 2011

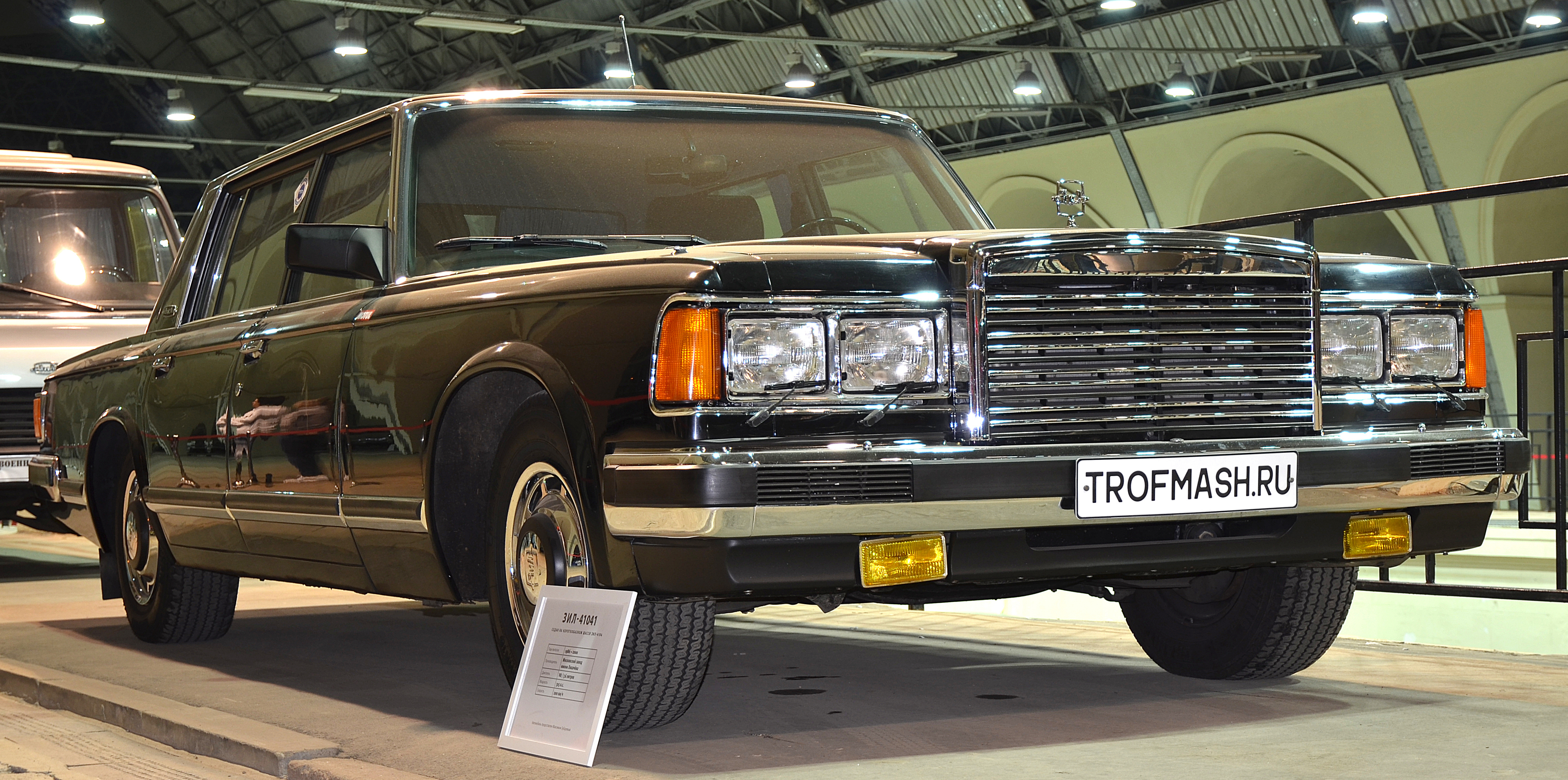
ZIL-41041

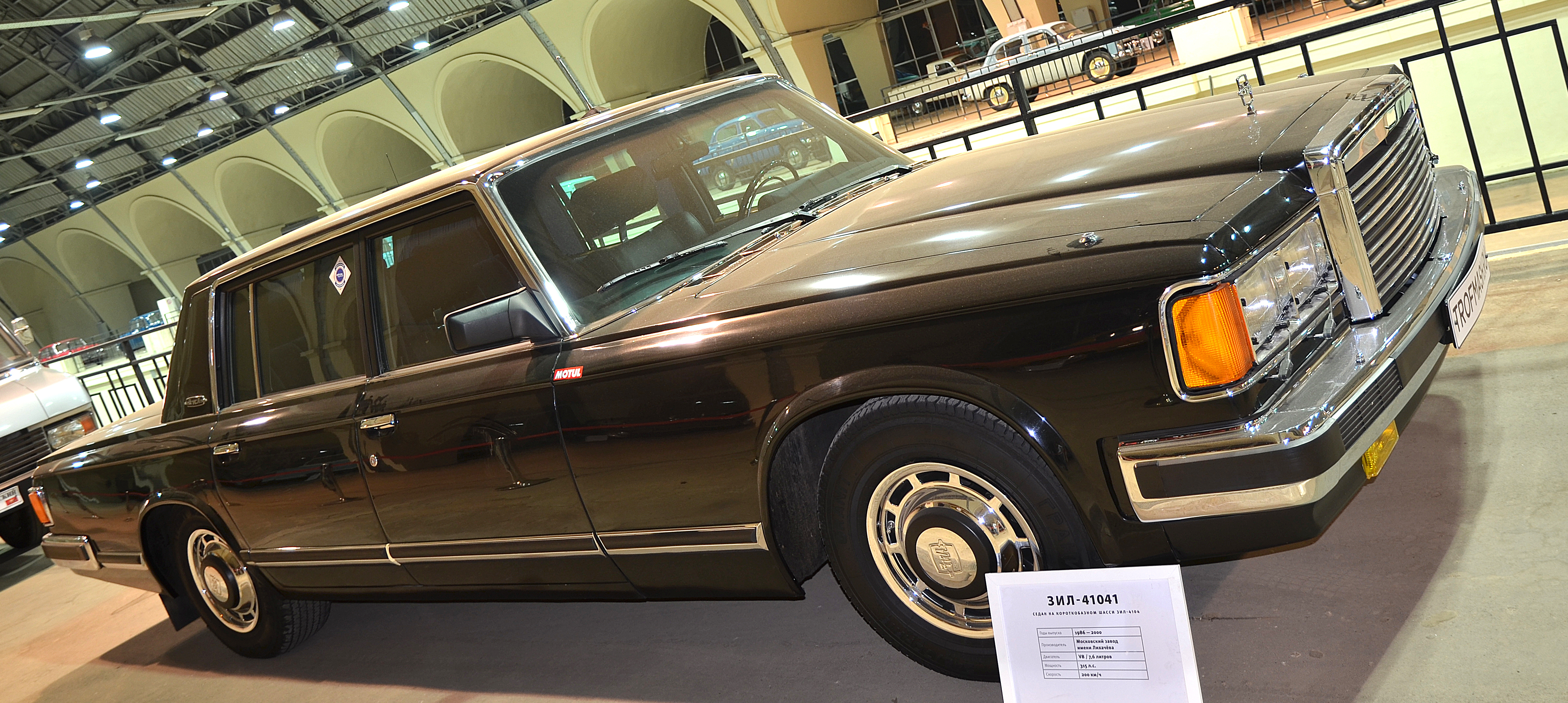
ZIL-41041
