= ZIL-4112R =

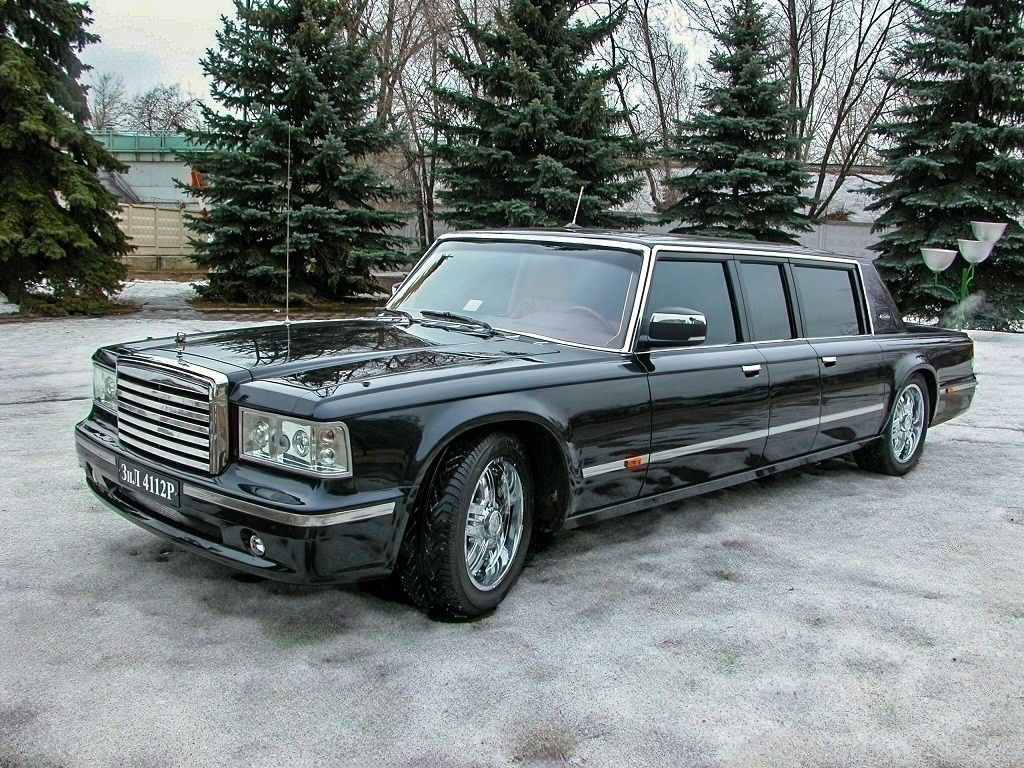
- ZIL-4112R on the Kremlin spruce background

Overview
- Manufacturer: Zavod Imeni Likhacheva
- Production: 2006–2012
- Assembly: Russia: Moscow (Likhachov Plant)

Body and chassis
- Class: Luxury car
- Body style: Limousine (ZIL-4112R); Saloon
- Layout: FR layout

Powertrain
- Engine: 7.7L ZIL-4104 V8
- Transmission: Allison 1000 6-speed automatic

Dimensions
- Wheelbase: 4,080 mm (160.6 in) (ZIL-4112R)
- Length: 6,230 mm (245.3 in) (ZIL-4112R)
- Width: 2,086 mm (82.1 in)
- Height: 1,500 mm (59.1 in)
- Curb weight: 3,800 kg (8,378 lb) (ZIL-4112R)

Chronology
- Predecessor: ZIL-41047
- Successor: Aurus Senat (spiritual)

The ZIL-4112R is a luxury car with a limousine body type built by ZIL a Russian automobile manufacturer of Russia. Developed as a further development to the earlier ZIL-41047, the ZIL-4112R was primarily intended to serve as an official state vehicle for Russia's highest-ranking officials. Known for its robust construction and imposing design, the ZIL-4112R epitomizes Russian engineering and the country's tradition of producing high-end limousines for government use.

== History ==
The vehicle was dubbed "Limo Number One" and was specifically designed and built for the President of Russia as head of state and took six years to complete (2006–2012). The ZIL-4112R has six doors and a 7.7 litre (470 ci) V8 engine and includes calf-leather upholstery and video screens to show the exterior even if the windows are covered. The vehicle weighs 3.8 tonnes, and has a top speed of 125 mph (201 km/h), the fuel efficiency is 11 miles per gallon (25 litres per 100 km).

This new model (called the ZIL-4112R) has the suffix R - which is the first letter of the surname of Sergey Rozhkov, his initial was added after the model number due to his significant contributions to the design of the vehicle.

Only one car is believed to be produced by MSC6, which became an independent company and continues to carry out repair and restoration work of ZIL passenger cars.

In 2012, this model, the ZIL-4112R, was presented to the Russian government. However, there were no orders from the Russian government. President Vladimir Putin is said to have made negative comments about the new model during a visit, which is still recognizably based on the previous model from the 1970s. Putin then arranged for the Aurus Senat to be developed as a completely new luxury sedan, which became much more successful.

== Design and specifications ==
This six-door limousine is powered by a 7.7-litre V8 fuel-injected gasoline engine, connected to a 6-speed automatic transmission, it outputs 400 hp (298 kW) and 610 Nm (450 lb-ft) of torque.

== Features ==
The ZIL-4112R features dual-zone climate control, with an "air wall" which separates the two zones from mixing with each other.

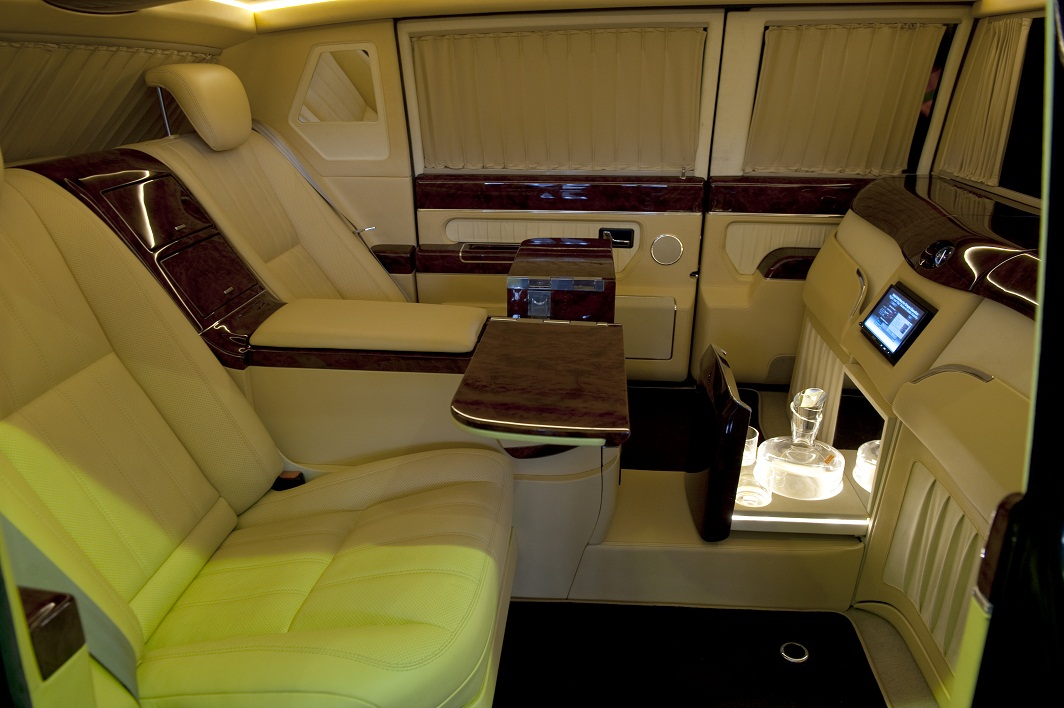
Interior

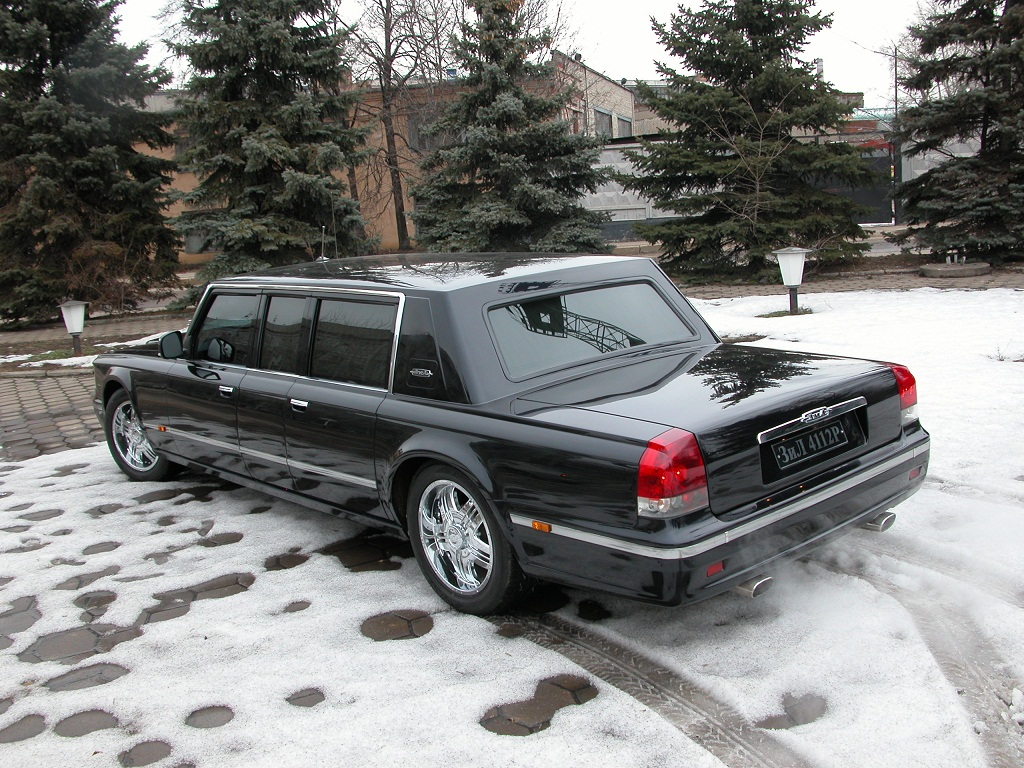
ZIL-4112R (rear view)
