= ZIL-133 =

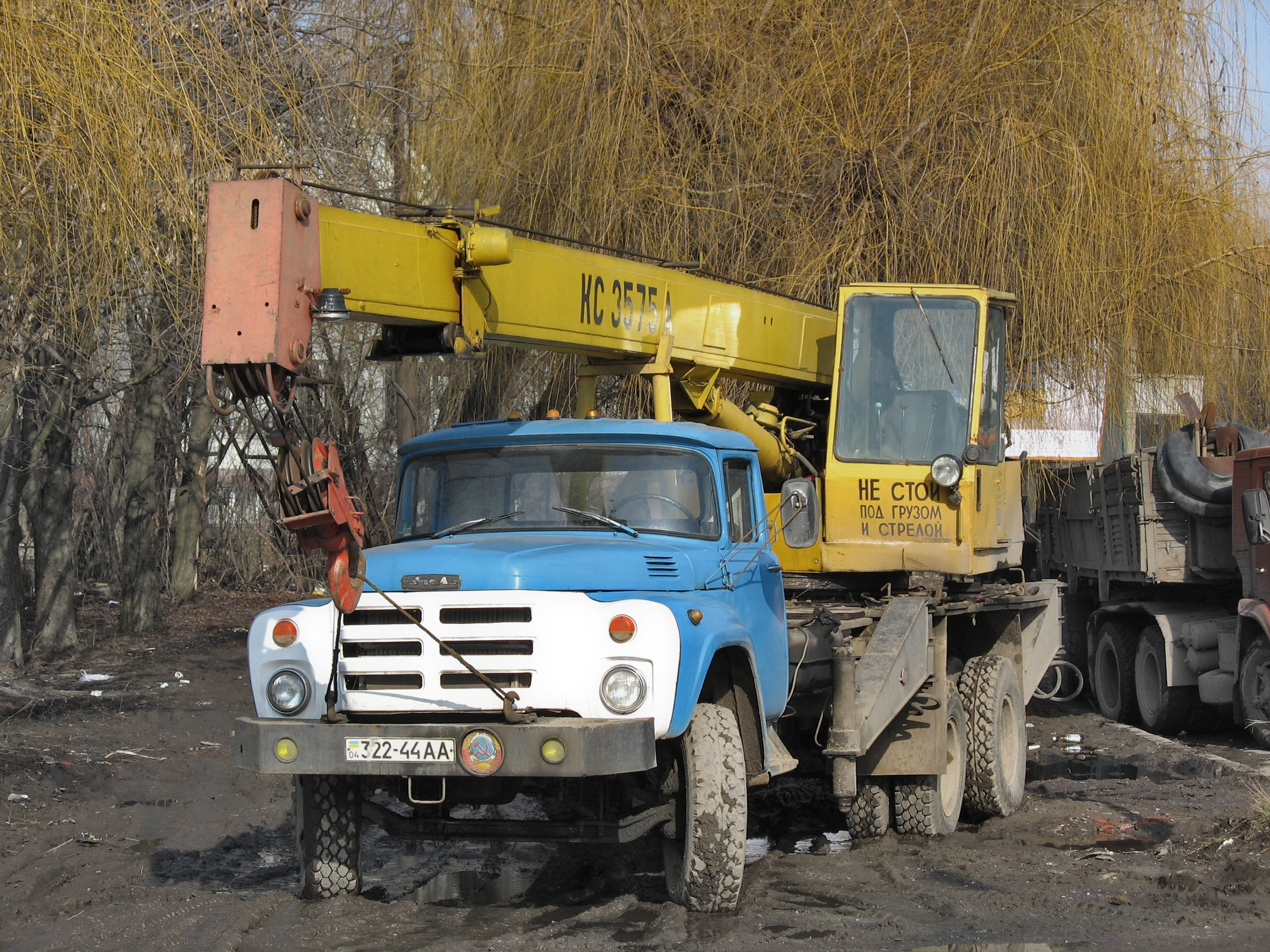
- ZIL-133GYa crane (KS-3575)

Overview
- Manufacturer: ZiL
- Production: 1975-2000
- Assembly: Moscow

Body and chassis
- Class: Truck
- Layout: Front-engine, Rear-wheel drive
- Platform: 6×4
- Related: ZIL-130, ZIL-131, ZIL-4331, KamAZ-5320

Powertrain
- Engine: V8, Four-stroke engine, Diesel and petrol engines
- Transmission: manual, 5-,8-,9-,10-step transmissions

Dimensions
- Wheelbase: 3,710 mm (146.1 in)
- Length: 9,000 mm (354.3 in)
- Width: 2,500 mm (98.4 in)
- Height: 2,345 mm (92.3 in)
- Curb weight: 6,875 kg (15,157 lb)

Chronology
- Predecessor: ZIL-157
- Successor: ZIL-133G40

ZIL-133 is a Soviet/Russian 3 axle straight truck produced by ZIL (Zavod Imeni Likhachyova) in Moscow from 1975 to 2000. The first prototypes were developed in the early 1970s years in the Soviet Union. It was intended as a 3 axle version of the ZIL-130 with a higher payload.

== History ==
Although the development of a truck on the base of ZIL-130 with a payload of 8 tons and 6×4 chassis configuration begun in the early 1960s and first prototypes were finalized in 1966, the serial production was postponed many times and begun only in the middle of the 1970s. The first petrol motor was developed on the basis of the ZIL-130 engine and has 140 kW of power with a torque of 441 Nm at 3800–3900 rpm, compression ratio of 7.5 and a cubic capacity of 6 liters. However the need in such a truck family was under question due to the introduction of the new KamAZ plant where the production of a new truck generation with modern Diesel engines and cabover construction was planned.

Nevertheless, in 1975 the decision to start the production of the first modification ZIL-133G1 was made. The truck became the biggest petrol powered сivil truck in the Soviet Union. After a modification in 1979 and the renaming into ZIL-133G2 the maximum payload increased from 8 to 10 tons.

The production numbers of the first modifications were low. Especially, because of the parallel development of a modification with the diesel engine KamAZ-740 which subsequently received the index ZIL-133GYa and was produced since 1979. The main feature of this modification was a longer "nose" compare to the petrol powered models due to larger engine dimensions. The new engine has had a power of 154 kW and was more effective compare to the petrol-powered ZIL-133G2. The fuel consumption was reduced from 48.3 L to 26.6 L / 100 km at an average velocity of 60 km/h so the decision to take the ZIL-133G2 out of production was already made in 1983.

The production number greatly increased and the new ZIL-133GYa became a full-fledged front-wheel steered alternative to the new KamAZ cabover trucks. The production at ZIL factory in Moscow continued up to 1992, in other sources to 1994. Most of the produced vehicles had a bare chassis, prepared for installation of different constructions like cranes or fire equipment and less often for a flatbed. Afterwards the model was modernized again and got the cab from the new truck line ZIL-4331 and the index ZIL-133G40. With a new indexing system ZIL-630900, new engine YaMZ-236A-1, new gearbox YaMZ-238L or SAAZ-54232A-1700010-20/30, the truck was produced even up to 2002. It was then replaced by the successor ZIL-6309N0 with the engine YaMZ-236NE2 which complied to the Euro II emission regulations.

== Constructive features ==
Due to its unification with ZIL-130 there are only few constructive differences. One of the main technical differences are the steering axle with a straight beam, two driven axles, of which first carries the center differential with a manual lock as well as an extended frame with modified spar separation.

== Modifications ==
As typical for soviet vehicles, there existed many modifications of the ZIL-133 which were constructed for special operational purposes like Fire engines, cranes and agricultural vehicles.

- ZIL-133 – truck with a medium base, equipped with the petrol engine ZIL-133. Serially not produced.
- ZIL-133B – short base dumper. Serially not produced
- ZIL-133V – tractor modification. Only few vehicles were produced
- ZIL-133G – further development of the ZIL-133 version with a longer base, one fuel tank and a platform with two side boards
  - ZIL-133G1 – unified modification of ZIL-133G with two fuel tanks, three side boards and maximal pay loads of 8 tons.
  - ZIL-133G2 – improved ZIL-133G1 with a payload of 10 tons and full weight of 17,1 tons. They were equipped with a 110 kW V8 petrol-engine and produced from 1977 to 1979
- ZIL-133D – short base dumper
  - ZIL-133D1 – simplified version of the ZIL-133D
- ZIL-144N- agricultural vehicle with arched tires
- ZIL-133GYa – Modification of the ZIL-133G2 with diesel engine KamAZ-740
- ZIL-133VYa – tractor and dumper with the diesel engine KamAZ-740
  - ZIL-E133VYaT – tractor with the 190 kW turbo diesel engine KamAZ-7403. Serially not produced
- ZIL-133G40 – further development of the ZIL-133GYa with the cab of ZIL-4331 and diesel engines ZIL-6454/ZIL-645/Caterpillar 3116. Was produced from 1992 to 1999.
- ZIL-133G42 – special chassis for cranes with cab from the truck family ZIL-4331 and engine ZIL-6454. Was produced from 1992 to 1999.
- ZIL-133D42 – dumper with cab from the truck family ZIL-4331 and engine ZIL-6454. Was produced from 1992 to 1999.
- ZIL-13305A – tractor with extended cab from the truck family ZIL-4331 and engine ZIL-6454. Was produced from 1993 to 1999.
- ZIL-133G2A – modification of the ZIL-133G2 with cab from the truck family ZIL-4331 and petrol-engine ZIL-508.10. Was produced from 1993 to 1995.
- ZIL-133G2B – chassis with cab from the truck family ZIL-4331 and petrol-engine ZIL-508.10. Was produced from 1993 to 1995.
- ZIL-133D52 – dumper with cab from truck family ZIL-4331 and petrol-engine ZIL-508.10. Was produced from 1993 to 1995.
- ZIL-451400 – dumper with body from NefAZ. Was produced from 1997 to 1999.
- ZIL-630900 – further development of the ZIL-133G40 with the engine YaMZ-236A. Was produced from 1999 to 2002.
- ZIL-640900 – tractor with the engine YaMZ-236A. Was produced from 1999 to 2002.
- ZIL-6309N0 – further development of the ZIL-630900 with the engine YaMZ-236NE2 (complied to Euro II). Was produced from 2002 to 2005.
- ZIL-6309N2 – chassis for cranes with the engine YaMZ-236NE2 (complied to Euro II). Was produced from 2002 to 2005.
- ZIL-45222 – dumper with the engine YaMZ-236NE2 (complied to Euro II) and body from MMZ. Was produced from 2002 to 2005.
- ZIL-630980 – modification of ZIL-6309N0 with cab from Zil-433180 and engine MMZ D-260.E3. Only one vehicle was built in 2008.
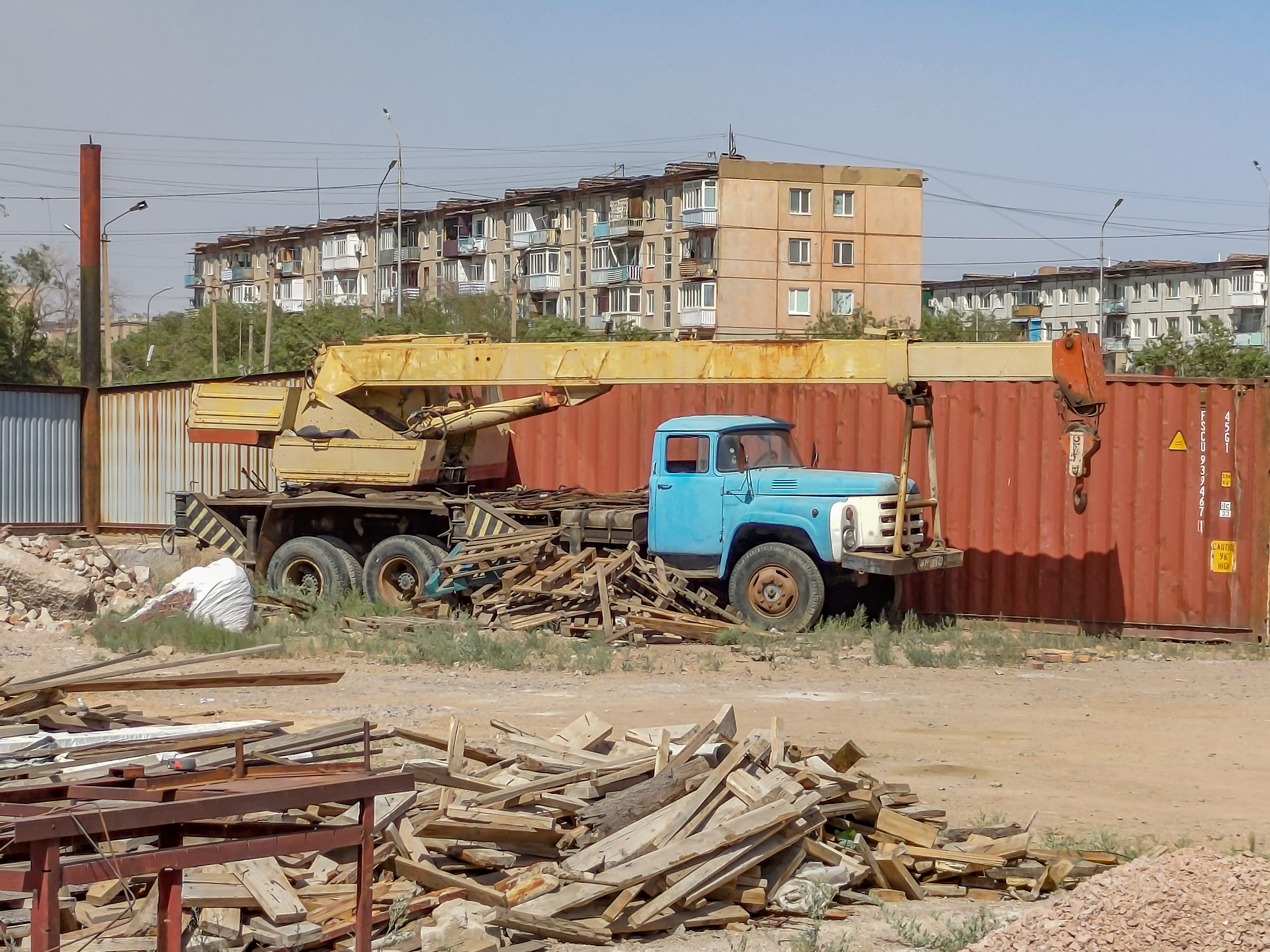
ZIL-133GYa crane (KS-3575)

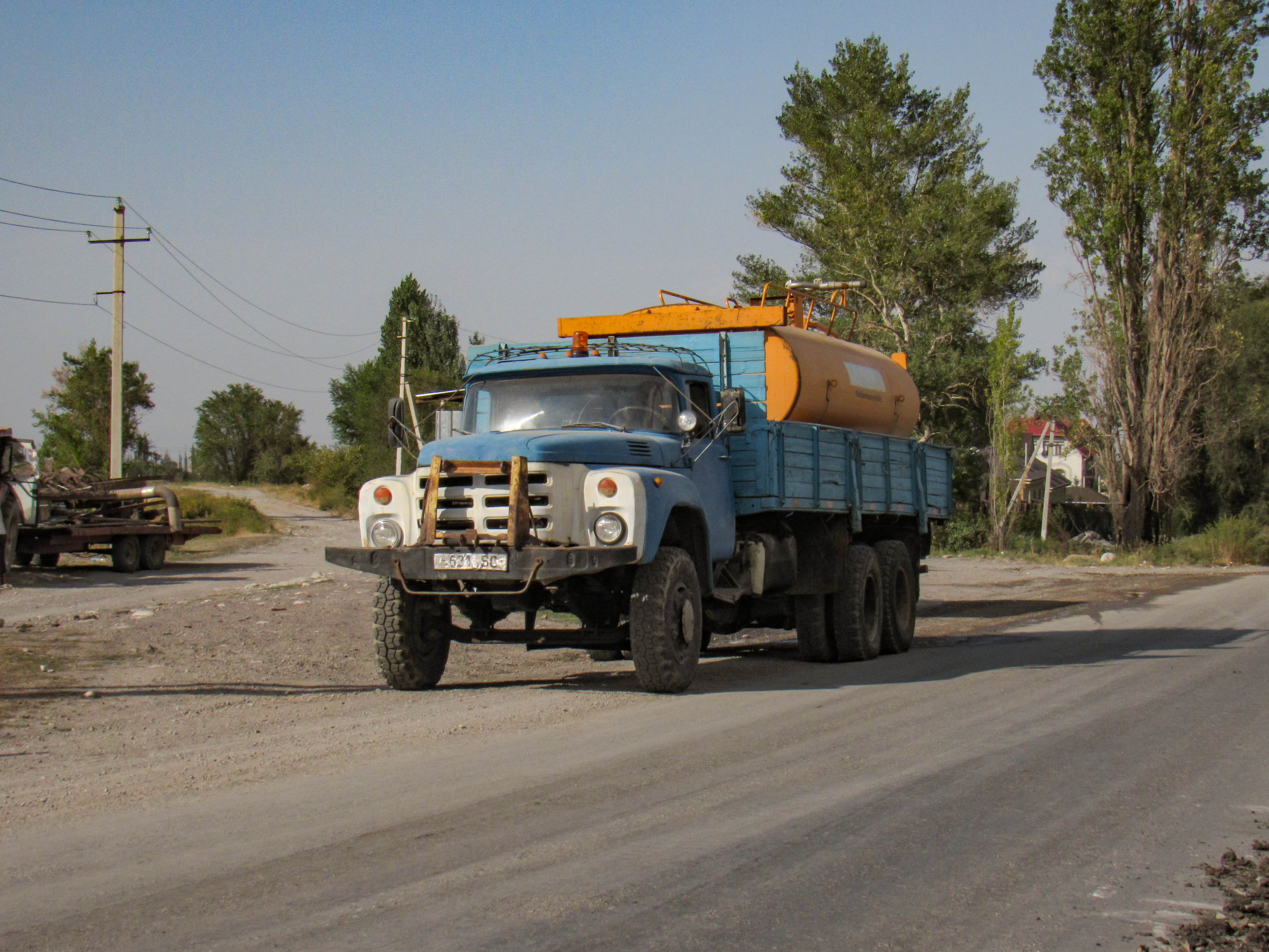
ZIL-133GYa

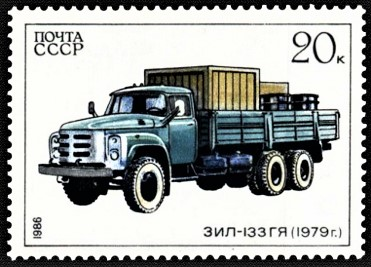
ZIL-133GYa on a soviet stamp

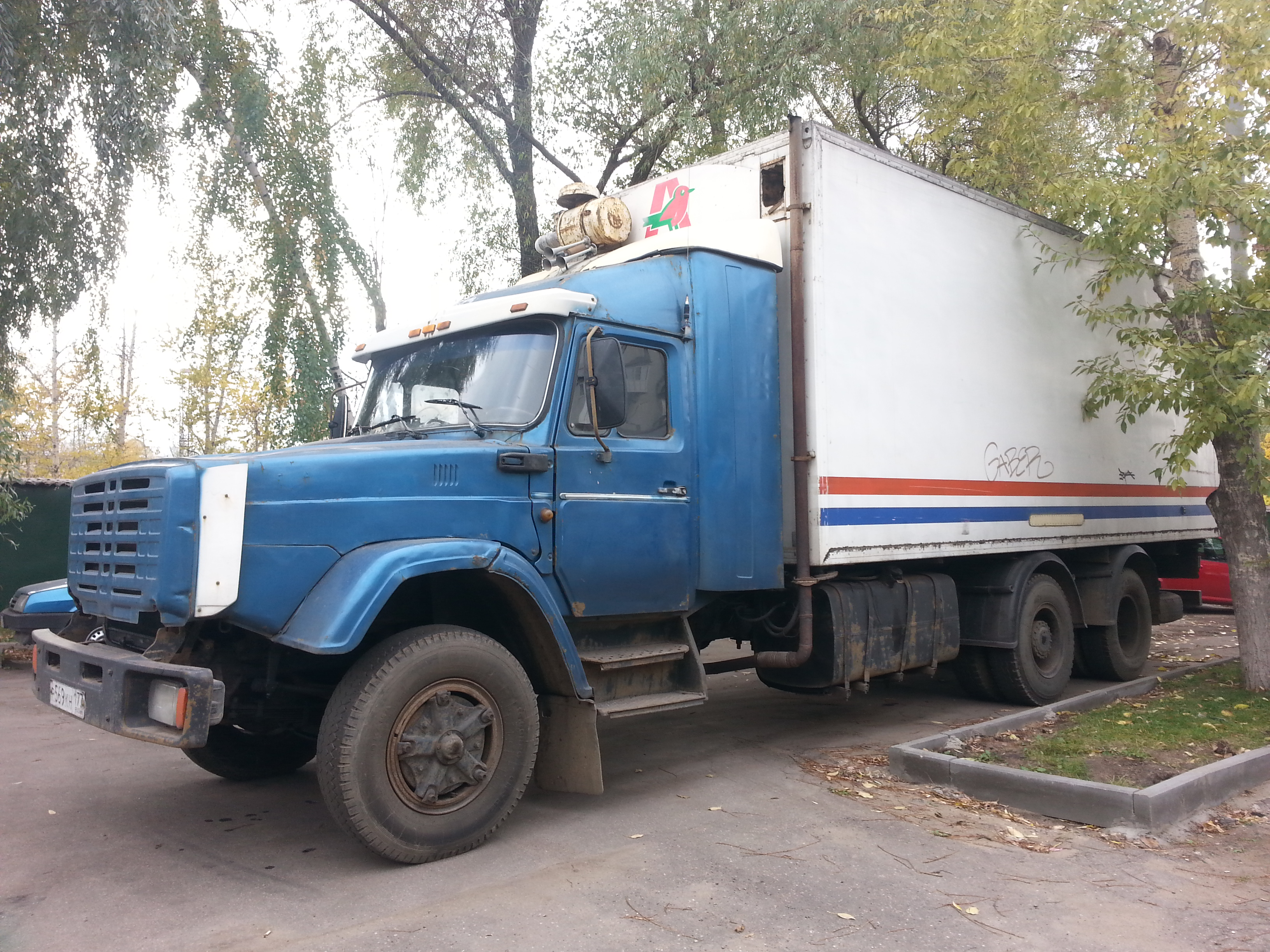
ZIL-133G40 with the more modern cab design in Moscow

== Special vehicles ==
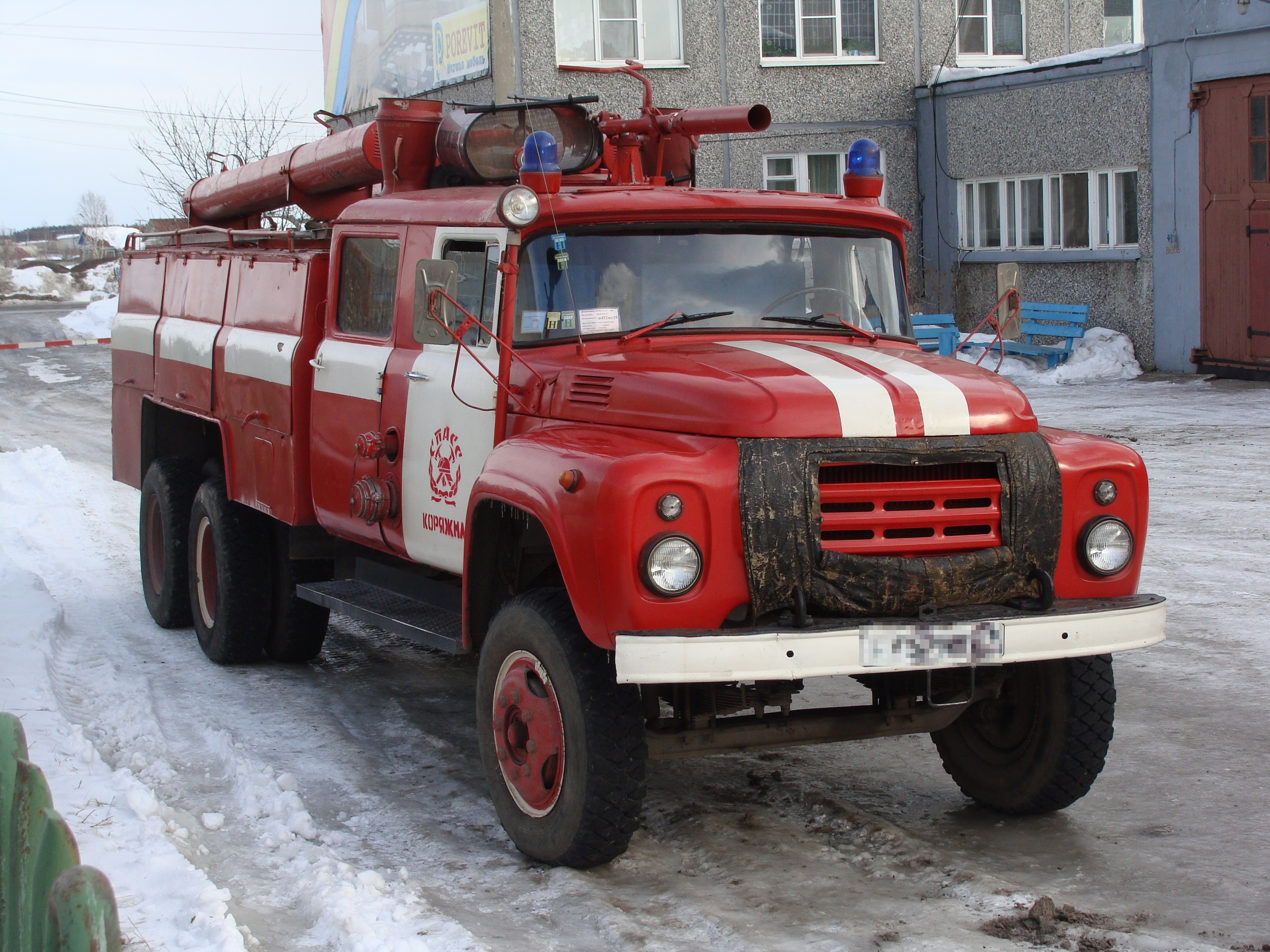
АZ-40 (133G)-181

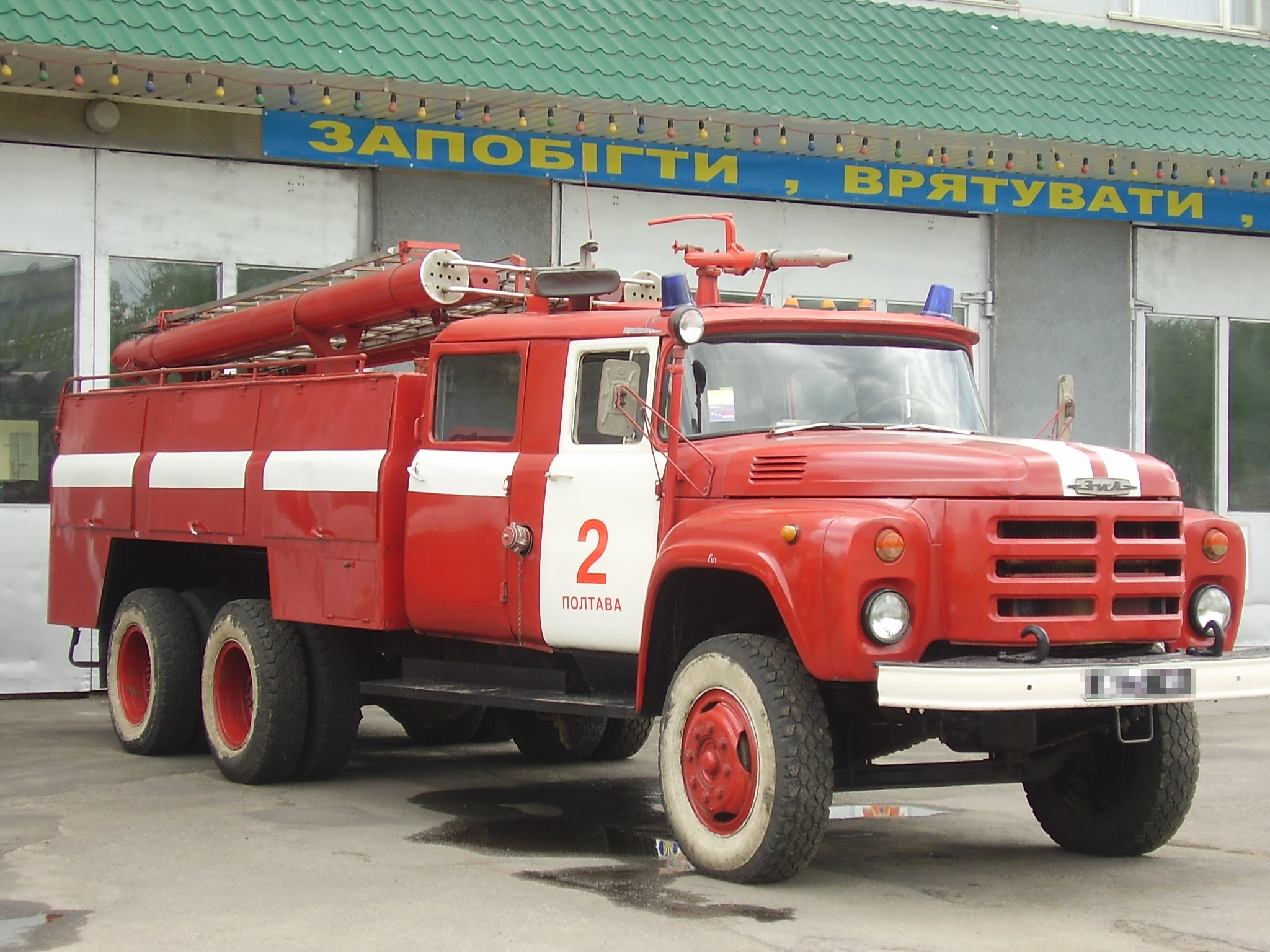
AZ-40 (133GYa)-181A

- KSA-7 – special agricultural spreader on ZIL-133G1 chassis with a payload of 7 tons and arched tire on rear axis.
- KS-3575A – a widely used truck crane in Soviet Union.
- AZ-40133G2-181/AZ-40133GYa-181A – Fire engine with water tender
- AL-45133GYaPM-501 – Fire engine with turntable ladder
- AKT-2.5/3133GYa-197 – special fire engine
- ZB-1591B1 – concrete mixer
- ZMU-8 – agricultural spreader of mineral fertilizers
- ASP-15 – water tender with pneumatic unloader and 15000 L volume
- AGP-28 – truck lift
- KAvZ-59821 – horse transporter
- DISA-6938 – Cash-in-transit
