= ZIL-130 =

Soviet/Russian truck

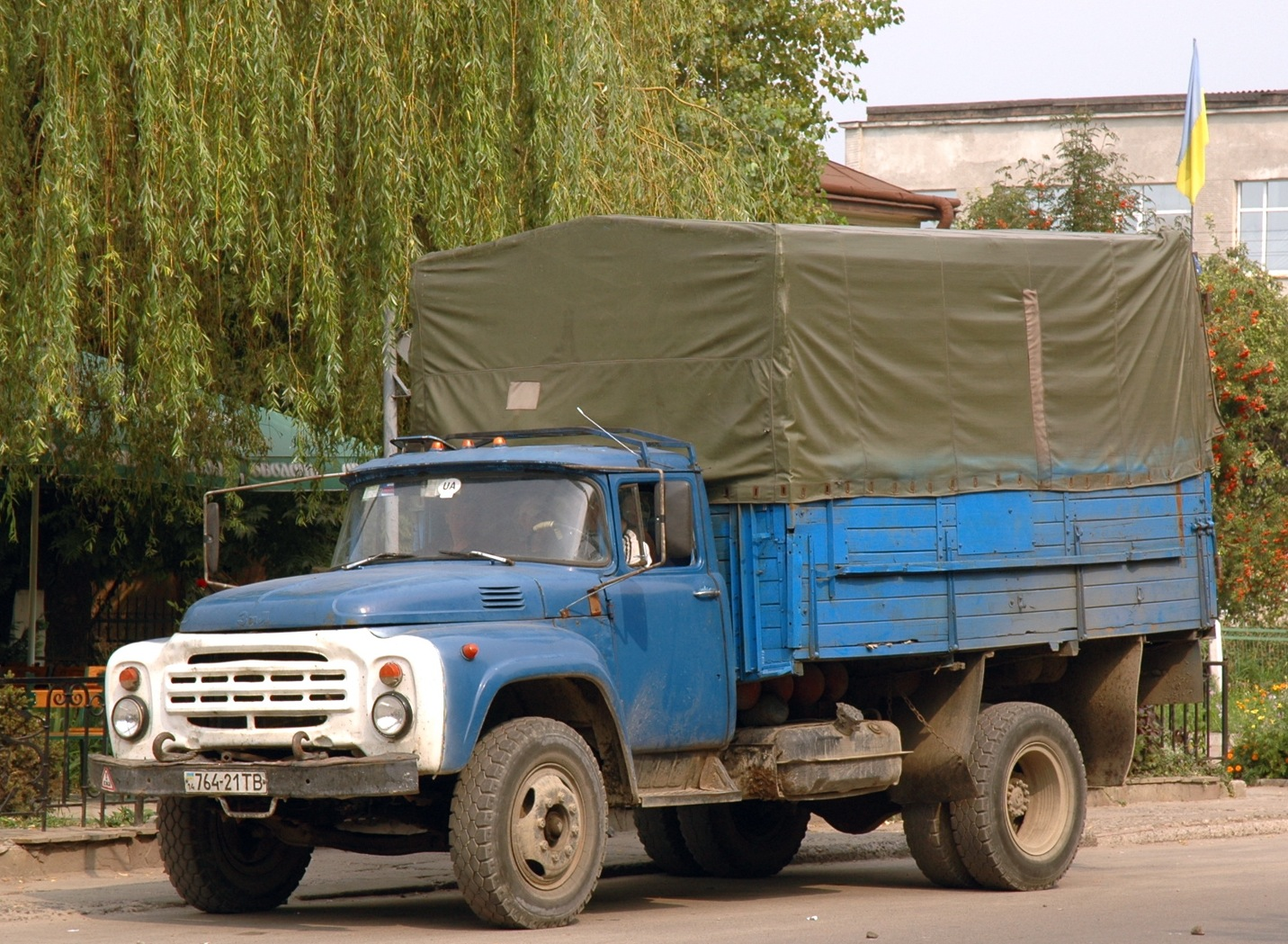
- ZIL-130 (1977–2012)

Overview
- Manufacturer: ZIL
- Production: 1962–2012
- Assembly: Soviet Union/Russia: Moscow (1962–1994); Soviet Union: Chita (1974–1978); Russia: Novouralsk (1994–2012)

Body and chassis
- Class: 5-6-ton truck
- Body style: 2-door standard cab 4-door double cab (for fire engines)
- Related: ZIL-131; ZIL-133

Powertrain
- Engine: 6.0L ZIL-130 V8
- Transmission: 5-speed manual

Dimensions
- Wheelbase: 3,800 mm (149.6 in)
- Length: 6,675 mm (262.8 in)
- Width: 2,500 mm (98.4 in)
- Height: 2,400 mm (94.5 in)
- Curb weight: 4,300 kg (9,480 lb)

Chronology
- Predecessor: ZIL-164
- Successor: ZIL-4331

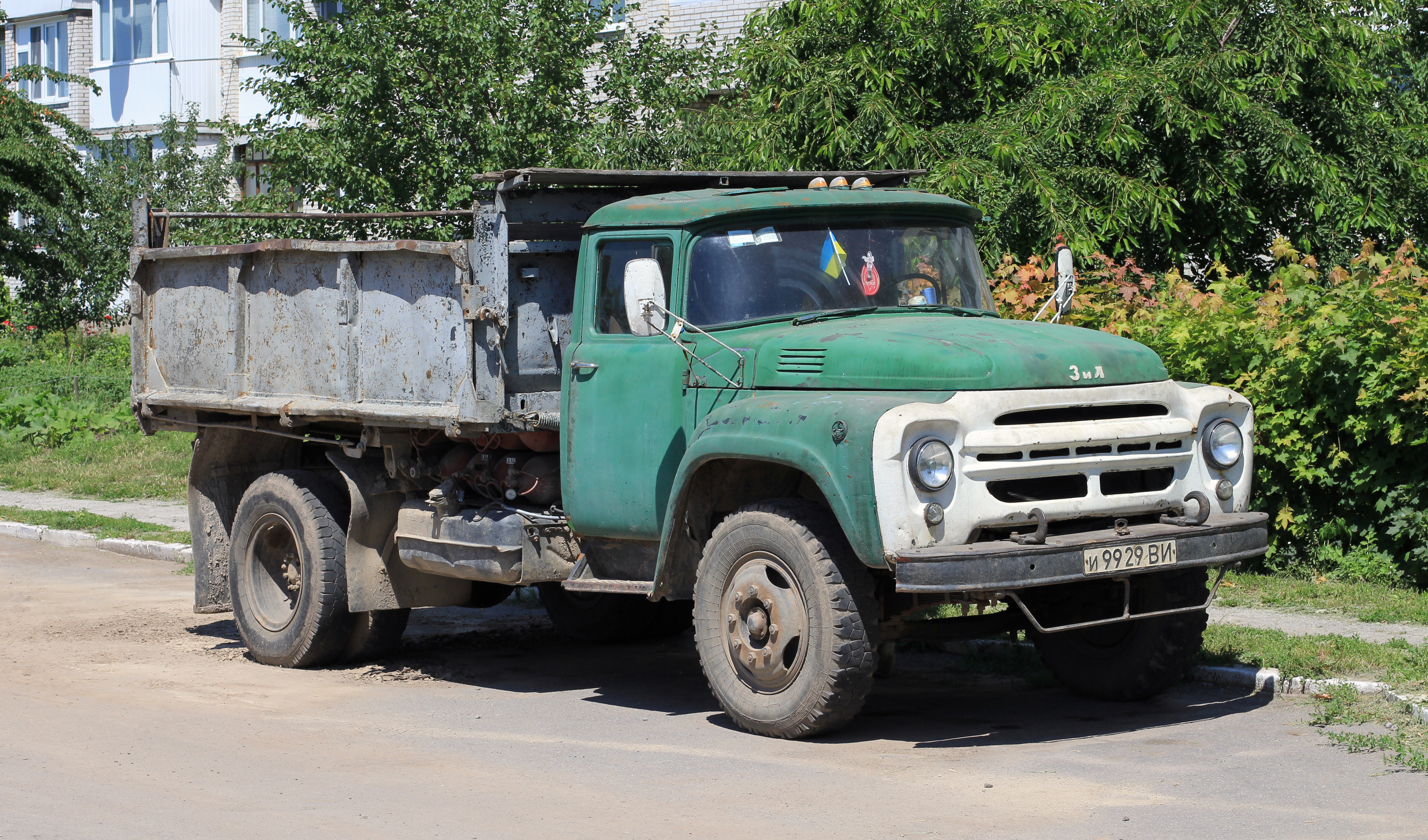
ZIL-130, pre-facelift model (1962–1977)

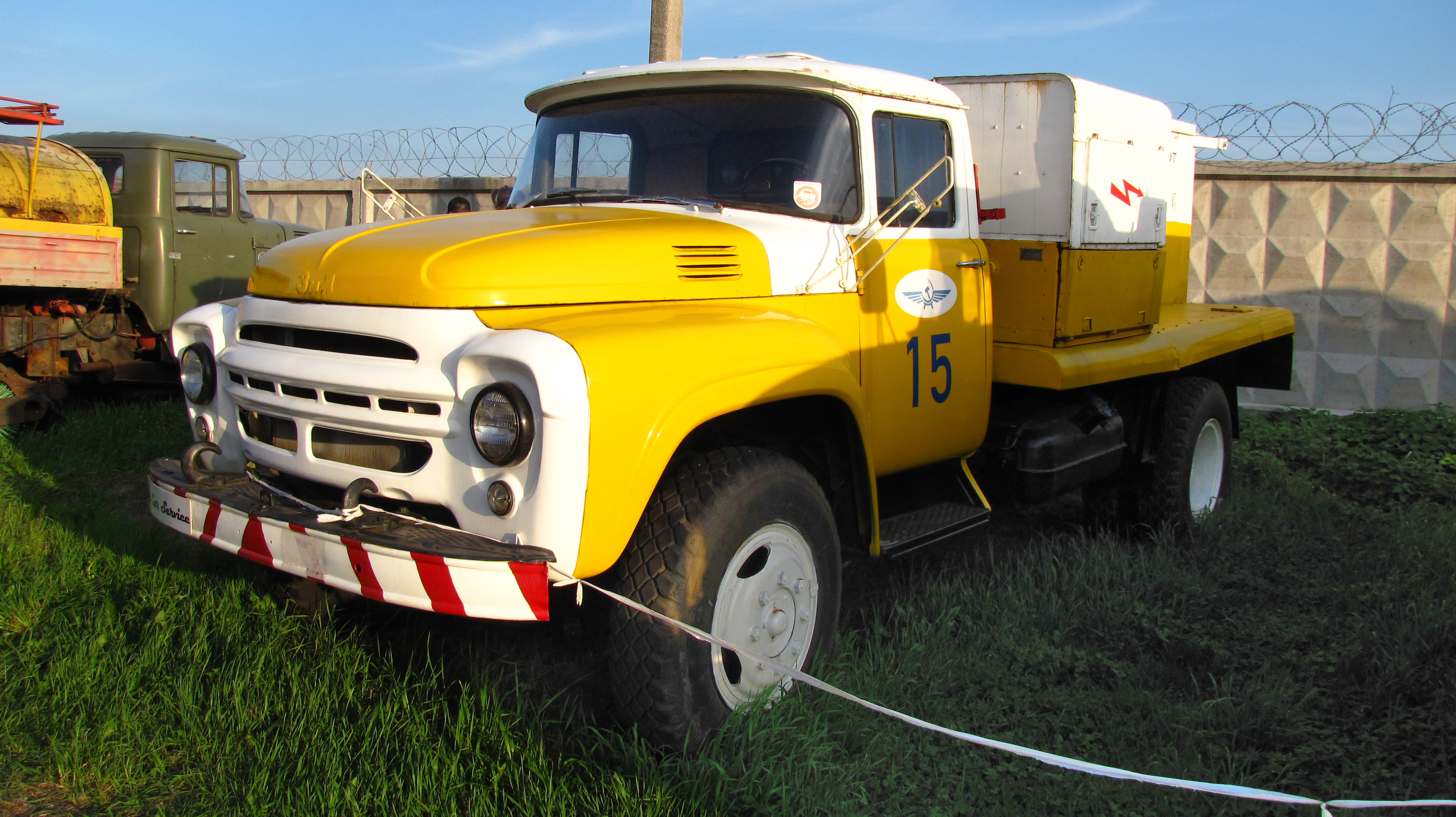
ZIL-130, pre-facelift model at the State Aviation Museum, Kyiv

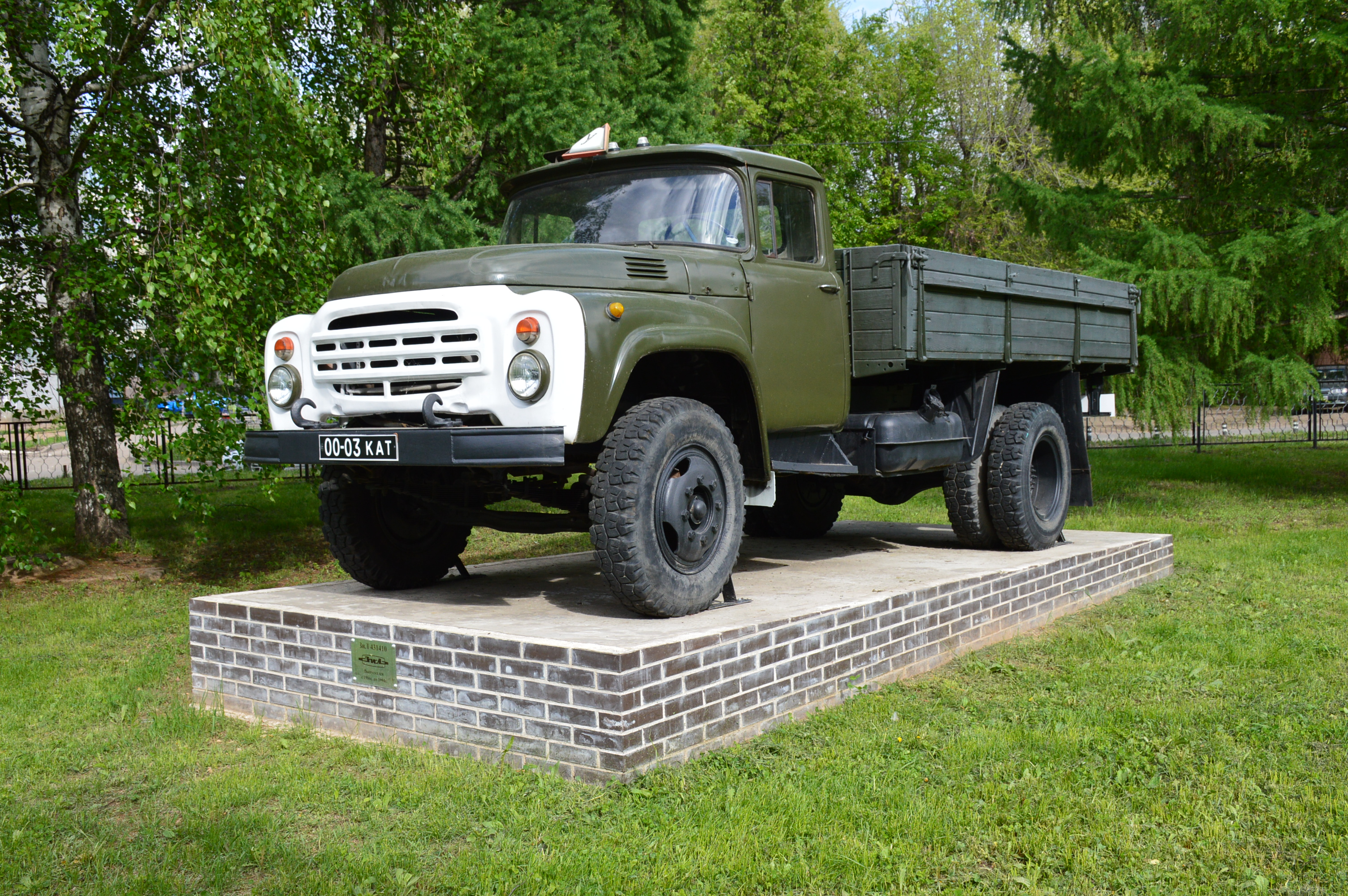
ZIL-130, facelift model

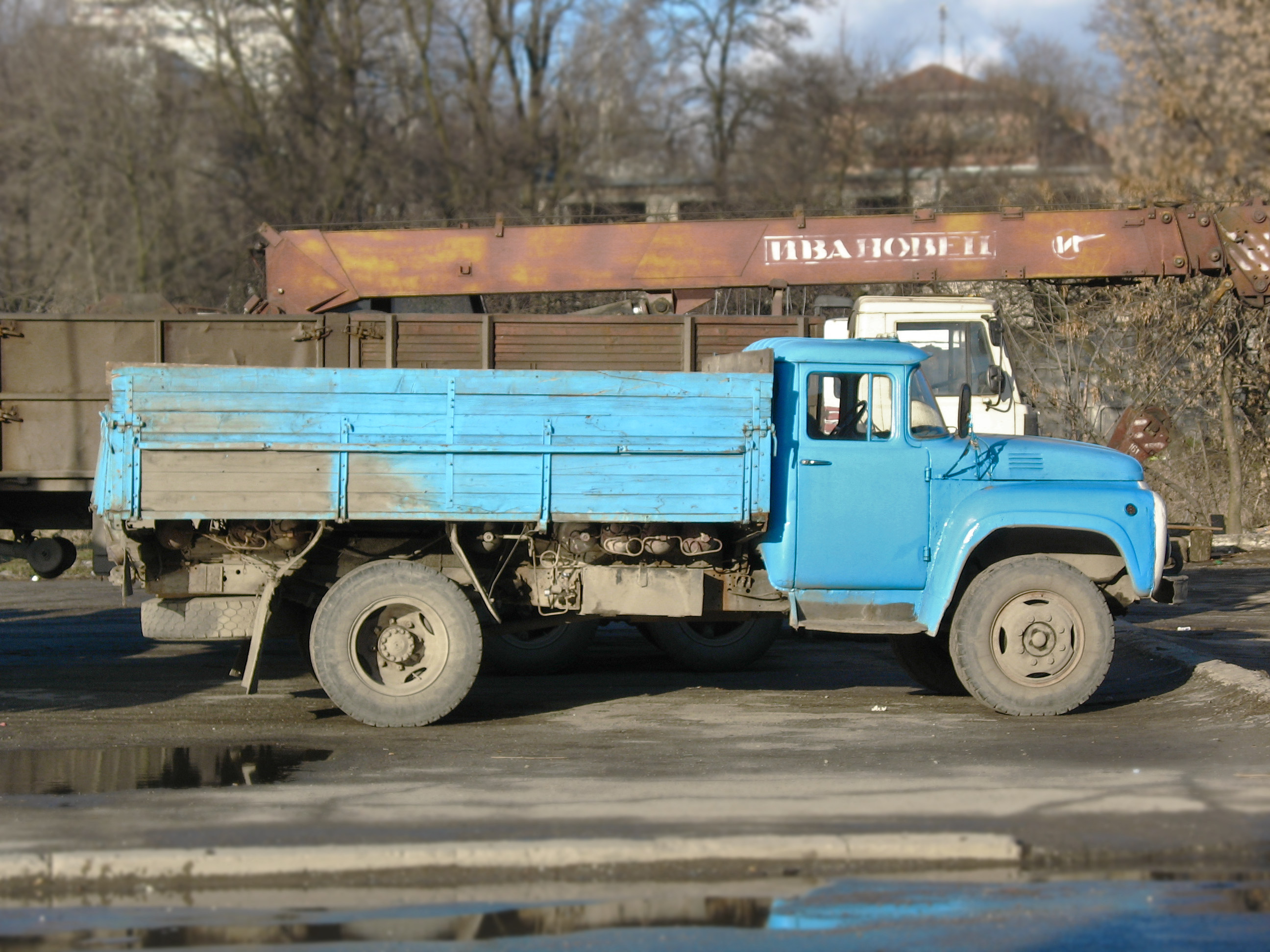
ZIL-130 flatbed

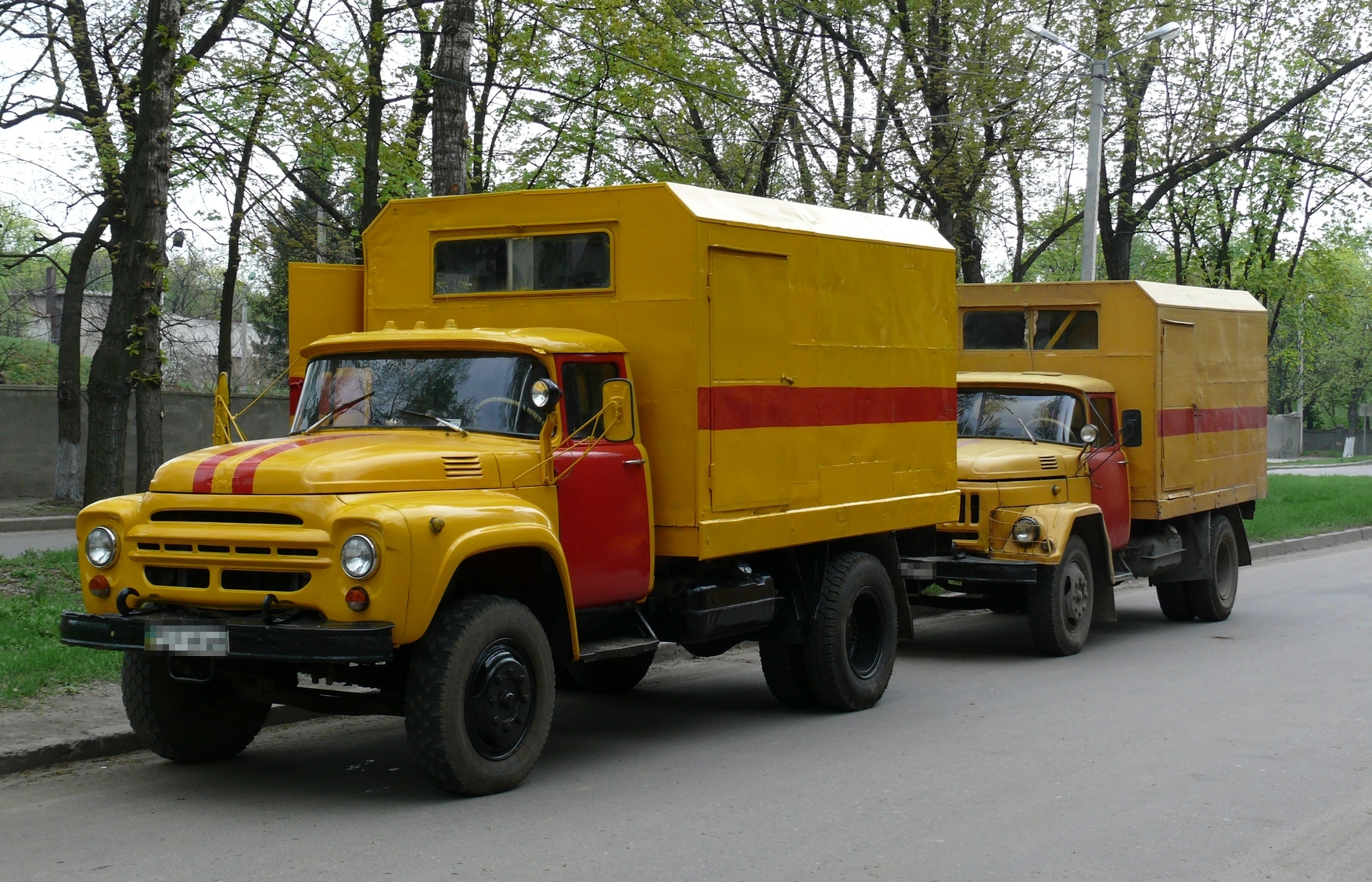
Two ZIL-130's, both of Ukrainian Emergency Gas Service. The second one has a replaced cabin from a ZIL-131 or Amur-531350 produced by UamZ in Novouralsk.

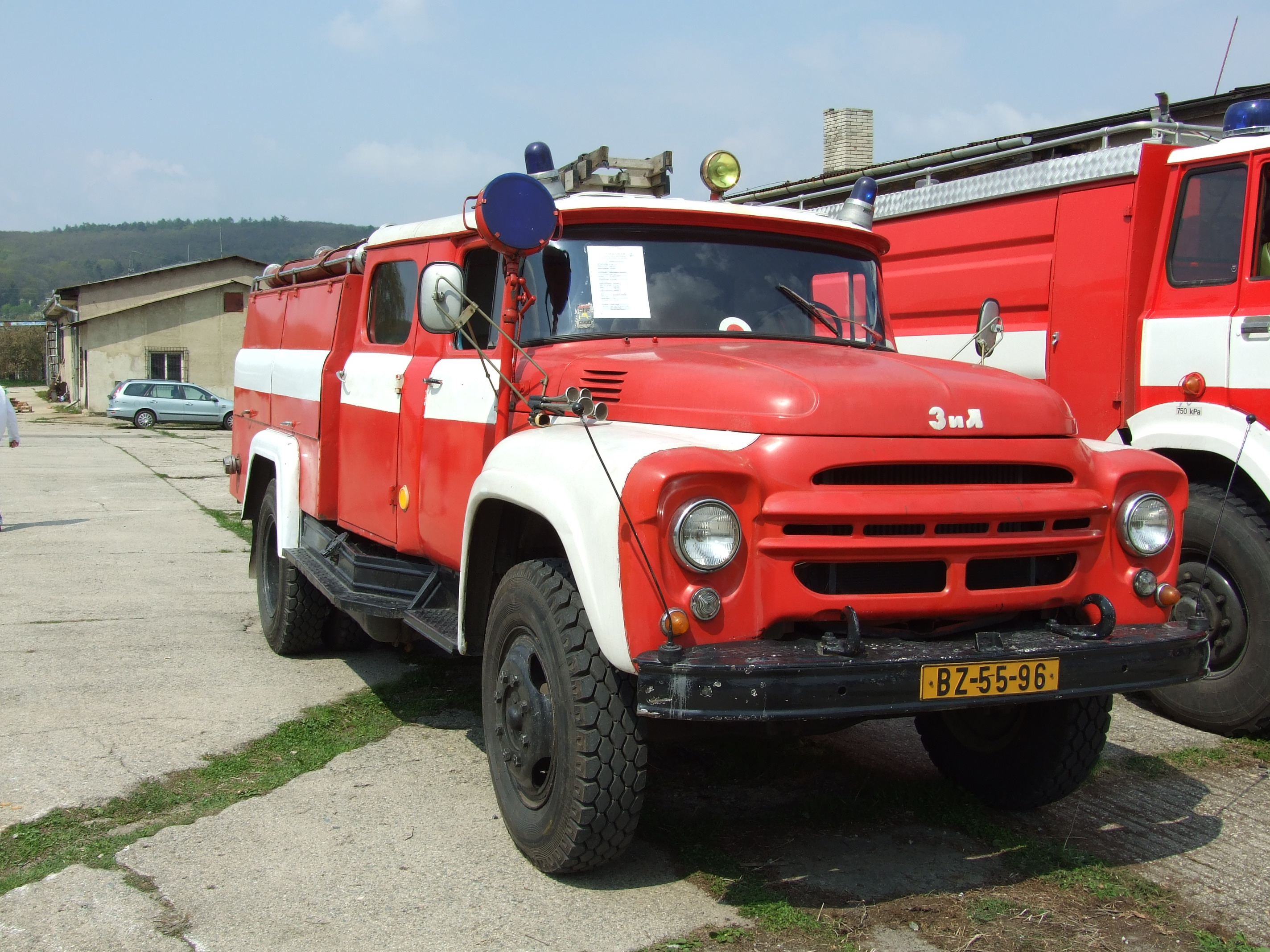
ZIL-130 fire engine

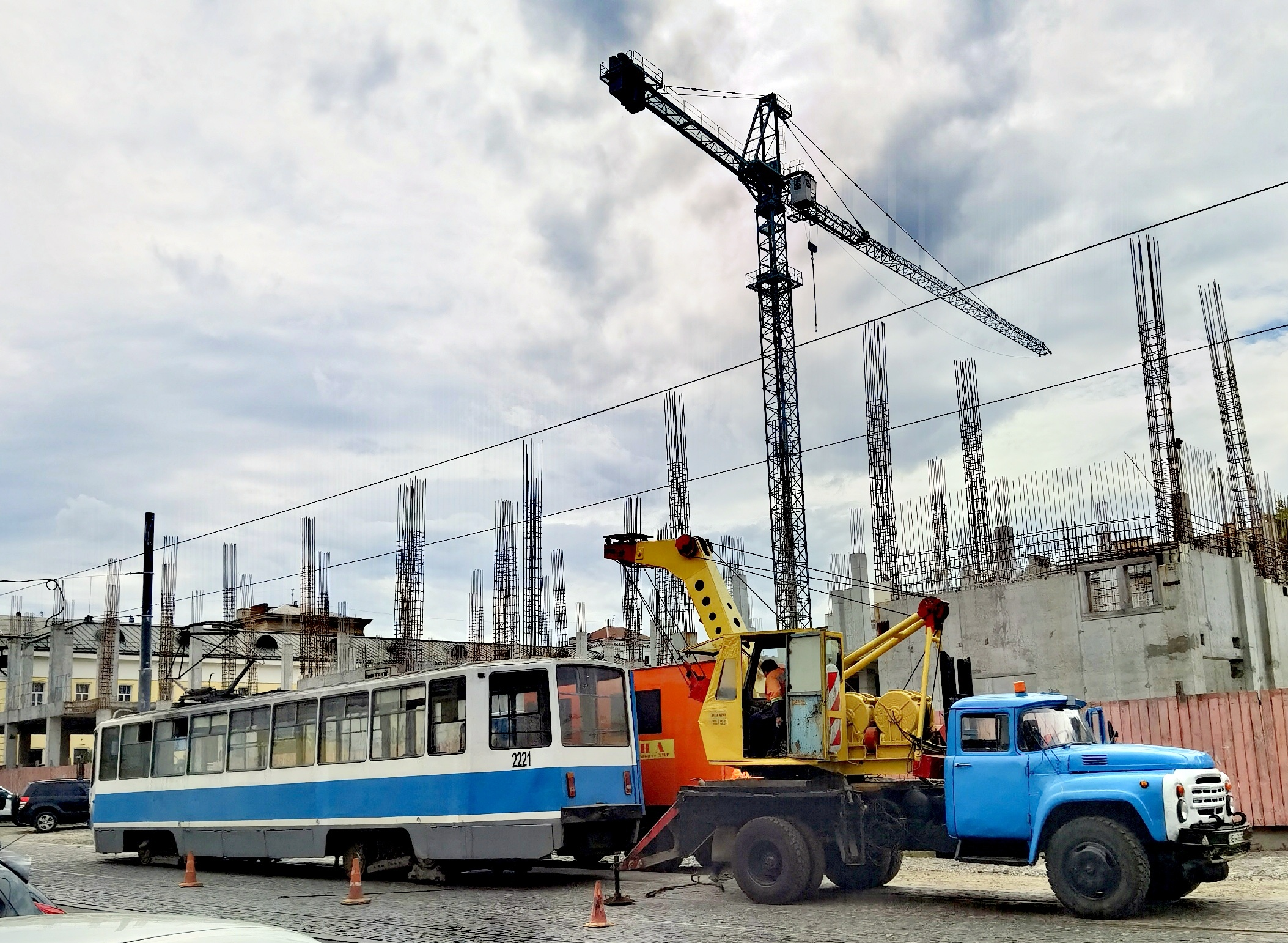
ZIL-130 with crane

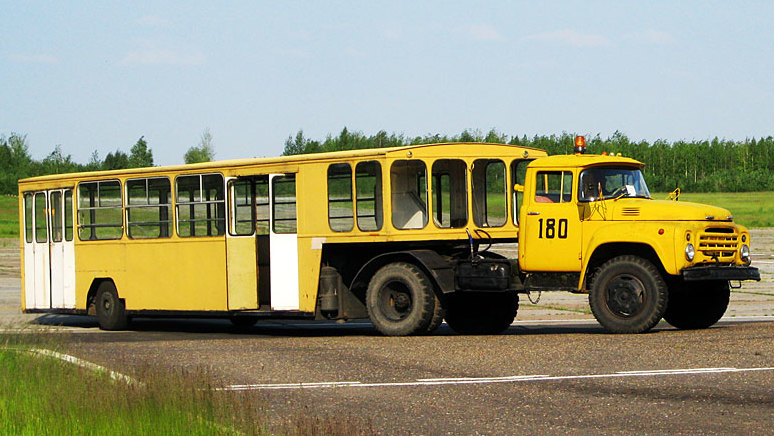
ZIL-130V1 with "APPA-4" semi-trailer

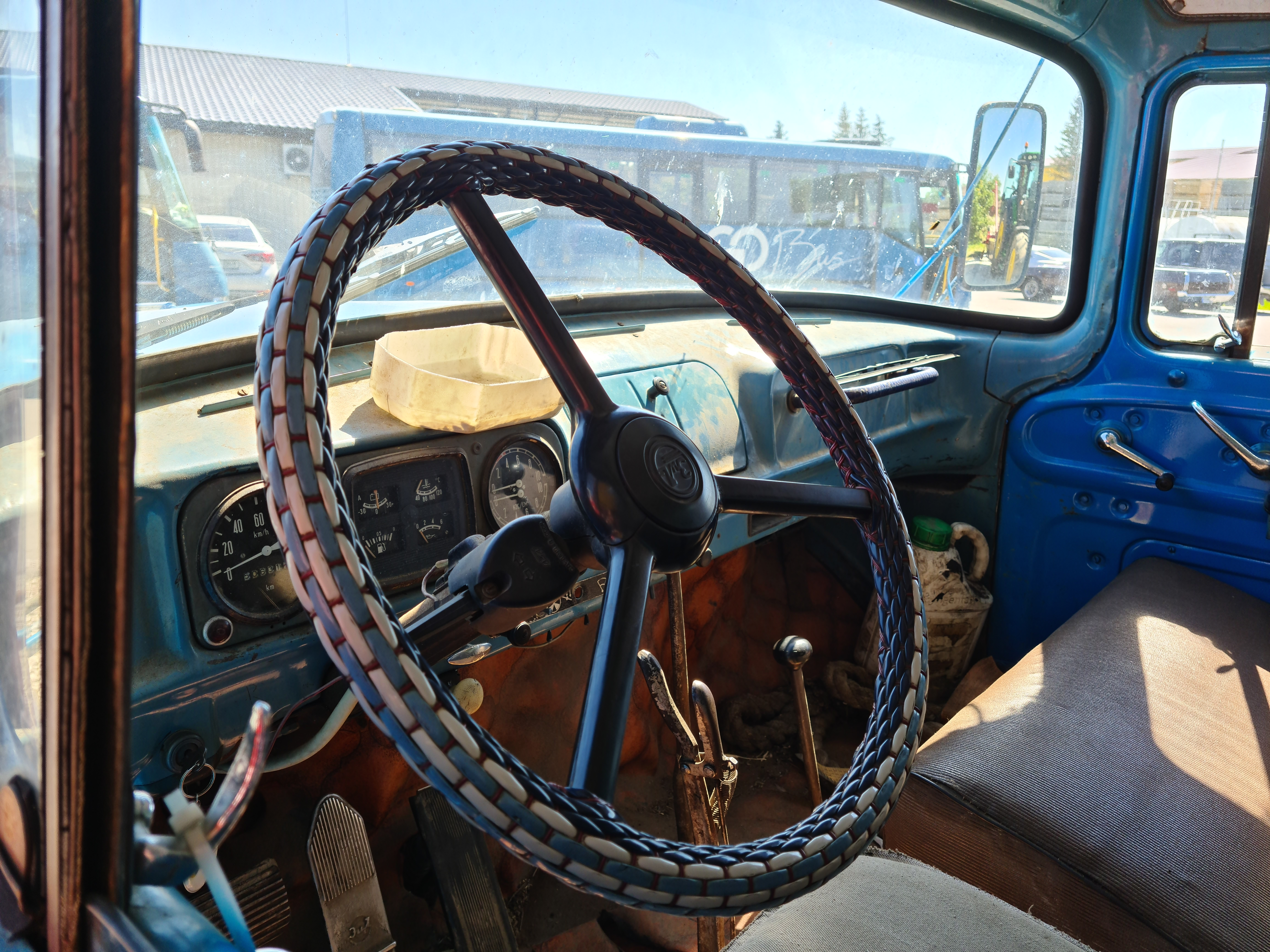
Interior

The ZIL-130 is a Soviet/Russian 5-6-ton truck produced by ZIL in Moscow, Russia. The first prototype was built in 1956. Production began in 1962, while mass production started in 1964. In total, ZIL built 3,380,000 trucks up to 1994, making it one of the most numerous cargo trucks in the USSR and Russia. In 1995, production was moved to the now-defunct Ural Motor Plant (UamZ, its trucks were known as UamZ-43140).

== History ==
ZIL started working on a replacement for the ZIL-164, right after De-Stalinization took place. The first prototype was built some months later and had an all-new cabin, as well as a wider, wraparound windshield.

The new model retained little from its predecessor, with a new V8 engine (displacing 6.0 liters) and a more reinforced frame. The newer truck was slightly shorter in wheelbase than the ZIL-164 truck. Mass-production started in 1964 under the ZIL-130 name, and soon the ZIL-164 was discontinued in favor of its more modern successor.

The ZIL-130 received the latest features adopted by the global car industry of the 1950s while not being based on any foreign model and having a unique chassis, cabin and other parts. In 1965, production of the 6x6 ZIL-131 variant intended for the military started and then the 6x4 ZIL-133 also followed; both of these were heavily based on the standard 4x2 ZIL-130 truck.

Since 1986, in accordance with the branch standard OST 37.001-269-83, the ZIL-130 series received new indexes: ZIL-431410 (ZIL-130), ZIL-431510 (ZIL-130Г), ZIL-441510 (ZIL-130В1), ZIL-431810 (ZIL-138), ZIL-431610 (ZIL-138А), etc.

In 1986, ZIL introduced the newer ZIL-4331, but production of the ZIL-130 continued even after the dissolution of the Soviet Union, eventually ending in 1995, when the design tooling was sold to UamZ and production there of a rebadged and slightly improved ZIL-130 would continue until 2012 as the UamZ-43140 and then as the AMUR-531350. The most notable difference between the UamZ/AMUR versions and the standard ZIL-130 was that the truck now used the cab from the ZIL-131 and was also available with a 4-cylinder MMZ D-240 engine, apart from the old V8.

Like the broadly similar 3.5 ton GAZ-53, the ZIL-130 was also available in a 4-door double cab configuration, but only in fire engine forms.

== Modifications ==
Over the course of production, there were two modernizations of the ZIL-130 in 1966 and 1977. After 1977, the radiator enclosure was changed.

- ZIL-130 Prototype 1956
- ZIL-130 Prototype 1962
- ZIL-130-66 – modification 1966
- ZIL-130-76 – modification 1976
- ZIL-130-80 – modification 1980
- ZIL-130AN – version powered by ZIL-157 engine
- ZIL-130B2 – chassis for ZIL-MMZ-554 and ZIL-MMZ-554M
- ZIL-130D1 – ZIL-130D with single-speed rear axle for ZIL-MMZ-555 and ZIL-MMZ-4502
  - ZIL-133D1E – chassis for ZIL-MMZ-555E, export version for temperate climates
  - ZIL-130D1T – chassis for ZIL-MMZ-555T, export version for tropical climates
  - ZIL-130D1Sh
- ZIL-130D2 – dump/tractor version for ZIL-MMZ-555A and ZIL-MMZ-45022
- ZIL-130D3 – chassis for dump truck
- ZIL-130E (1965) – export version for temperate climates
- ZIL-130Е (1967) – version with shielded electrics
  - ZIL-130EE – export version with shielded electrics for temperate climates
  - ZIL-130ET – export version with shielded electrics for tropical climates
- ZIL-130G – long wheelbase version
  - ZIL-130GE (1965) – export long wheelbase version for temperate climates
  - ZIL-130GE (1967) – long wheelbase version with shielded electrics
  - ZIL-130GET – export long wheelbase version with shielded electrics for tropical and temperate climates
  - ZIL-130GS – long wheelbase version for northern climates
  - ZIL-130GT – export long wheelbase version for tropical climates
- ZIL-130G1
- ZIL-130G1-76
- ZIL-130GU – extra long-wheelbase version, based on the ZIL-133G1
- ZIL-130GU-76
- ZIL-130K – cab-chassis version powered by ZIL-157D engine for ZIL-MMK-555K and ZIL-MMZ-45021 dump trucks
- ZIL-130KSh
- ZIL-130N – tractor-trailer version
- ZIL-130S – variant for northern climates
- ZIL-130S-76
- ZIL-130Sh
- ZIL-130T – export variant for tropical climates
- ZIL-MMZ-130P
- ZIL-MMZ-130S
- ZIL-130V1 – tractor-trailer version
- ZIL-130V1-76 – modification 1976
  - ZIL-130V1E (1965) – export tractor-trailer version for temperate climates
  - ZIL-130V1E (1967) – tractor-trailer version with shielded electrics
  - ZIL-130V1T – export tractor-trailer version for tropical climates
- ZIL-136I – diesel version for export, powered by a Perkins 6.345 engine
  - ZIL-136IG – long wheelbase diesel version for export, powered by a Perkins 6.345 engine
  - ZIL-136IDI – export diesel version for dump truck, powered by a Perkins 6.345 engine
- ZIL-138 – version powered by LPG
  - ZIL-138D2 – LPG powered version for MMZ-ZIL-45023
  - ZIL-138V1 – tractor-trailer version powered by LPG
- ZIL-138A – dual-fuel (CNG and A-76 gasoline) version
  - ZIL-138AG – dual-fuel, long wheelbase version
- ZIL-138I – dual-fuel (CNG and Al-93 gasoline) version
  - ZIL-138IG – dual-fuel, long wheelbase version
- ZIL-133 – three-axle version

=== Prototype modifications ===
- ZIL-130A – prototype version with a two-speed rear axle and trailer towing equipment
  - ZIL-130AU – ZIL-130A with reinforced frame and suspension
- ZIL-130A1 – prototype version with single-speed rear axle and trailer towing equipment
- ZIL-130B – prototype cab-chassis for agricultural dump truck
- ZIL-130D – prototype cab-chassis with two-speed rear axle (for industrial dump truck)
- ZIL-130F – prototype version powered by a ZIL-130F engine
- ZIL-130GU – prototype long wheelbase version with reinforced frame and suspension
- ZIL-130L – prototype version powered by a ZIL-120VK I6 engine with trailer towing equipment removed
  - ZIL-130AL – two-speed rear axle
  - ZIL-130BL – dump truck chassis
  - ZIL-130DL – short wheelbase tractor
  - ZIL-130GL – long wheelbase version
  - ZIL-130VL – tractor-trailer version
- ZIL-130M – prototype version powered by a ZMZ-41 V8 engine with trailer towing equipment removed
  - ZIL-130GM – prototype long wheelbase version
- ZIL-130N – prototype version with hydraulic system with pump and PTO (for MMZ-812 grain trailer)
- ZIL-130SHM – prototype version powered by a Steyr diesel engine
- ZIL-130V – prototype tractor-trailer version with a two-speed rear axle
  - ZIL-130VT – prototype tractor-trailer version with reinforced two-speed rear axle
- ZIL-130V1S – prototype tractor-trailer version for northern regions; produced in a small series
- ZIL-130V2 – prototype tractor-trailer version with 3,800 mm (150 in) wheelbase
- ZIL-E130 – prototype version with aluminum frame
- ZIL-136 – prototype diesel version
- ZIL-E138AV – prototype version powered by compressed gas
- ZIL-138AB – prototype dual-fuel (CNG and A-76 gasoline) version with trailer towing equipment (for ZIL-MMZ-45054); later redesignated as ZIL-496110 and entered production in 1987
- ZIL-138IB – prototype dual-fuel (CNG and AI-93 gasoline) version with trailer towing equipment (for ZIL-MMZ-45054)
- ZIL-175 – prototype with lifting axle
