= Jiefang CA-30 =

Chinese 2.5 ton 6x6 military cargo truck

Jiefang CA30
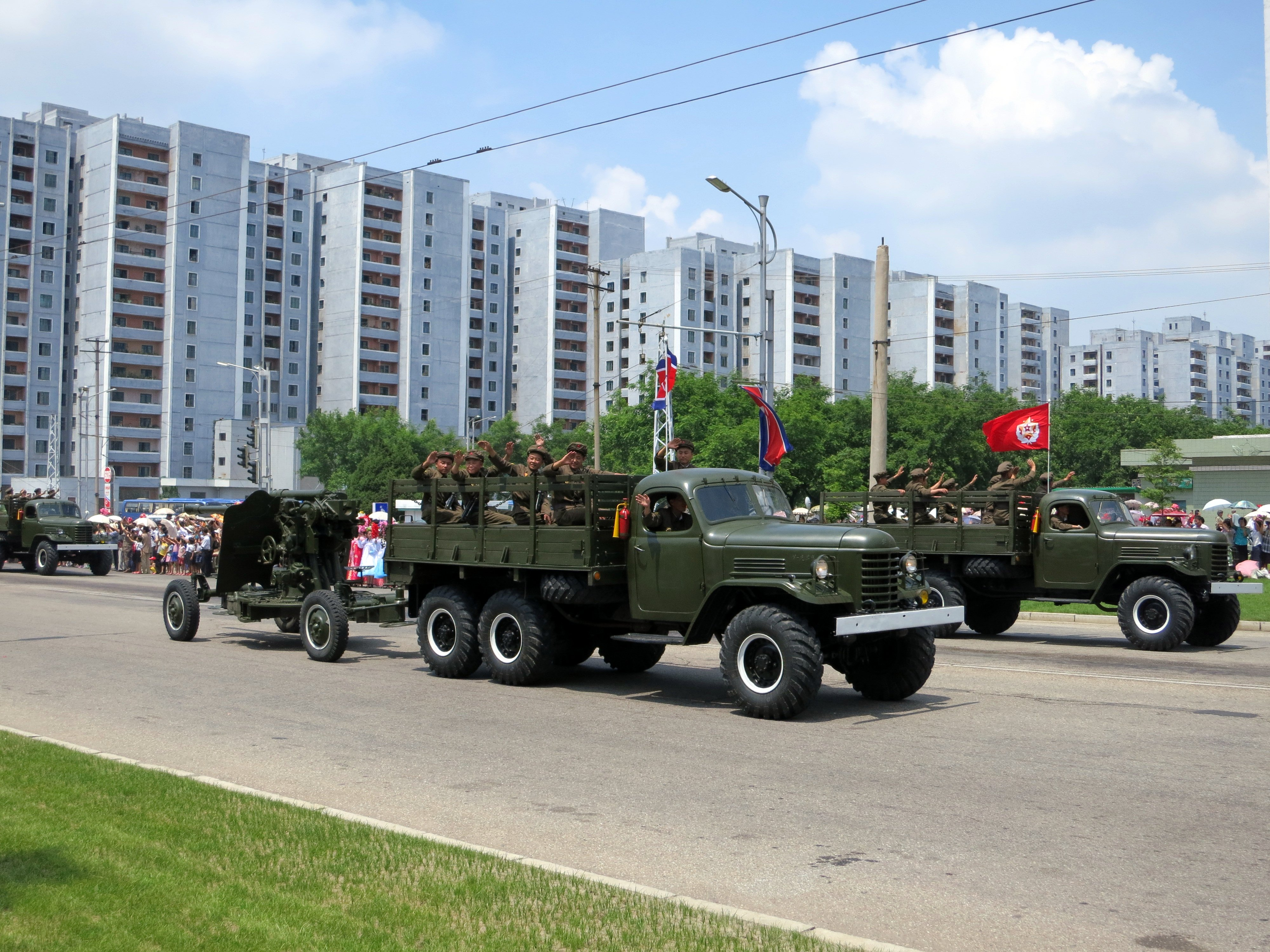
- Jiefang CA-30 trucks in service of the Worker-Peasant Red Guards of North Korea
- Type: 2 1 1/2 ton 6x6 cargo truck
- Place of origin: China

Service history
- In service: From 1964

Production history
- Manufacturer: FAW Jiefang aka JIEFANG
- Produced: 1964–1986

Specifications
- Mass: 11,770 lb (5,340 kg)
- Length: 263 in (6.68 m)
- Width: 91 in (2.31 m)
- Height: 108 in (2.74 m)
- Engine: Jiefang 120; 336 cu in (5.5 L) gas I6; 95 hp (71 kW)
- Suspension: Wheel 6x6
- Maximum speed: 40 mph (64 km/h)

The Jiefang CA-30 is a Chinese 6×6 military truck. It is a licensed-produced Soviet ZIL-157 6x6 army truck and indistinguishable to the original, except for its square fenders rather than round fenders on the Soviet-produced ZIL-157.

== History ==
Throughout the 1950s, the Soviet Army helped China build up their heavy industries. As part of this plan, China established the First Automotive Works (FAW) in Changchun Northern China. Soon after, in July 1956, they introduced the Jiefang CA-10 4x2 army truck, a copy of the Russian ZIS-150. In 1964 the first 6X6 CA-30 lorries for the People's Liberation Army were made by the then-called FAW Jiefang company and introduced into service.

The FAW Jiefang CA-30, like the Russian ZIL-157, had excellent cross-country capabilities and was available in a variety of configurations, such as cargo transport or tractor-trailer. Both the CA-10 and CA-30 were used extensively by the People's Liberation Army up until the 1990s, when they were largely phased out of service. Today, few remain in private hands. Later they specialized in off-road dump trucks and construction vehicles, most of these inspired by other Soviet designs. Iveco of Italy have since acquired the Jiefang Motor Vehicle Company. The manufacturer has since changed its name, now called FAW First Auto Works this company active since 1956.

In 1973 the firm designed and produced an all new 60-ton (empty) original dump truck model called the Jiefang CA-390; much of it was inspired by former large Russian dump trucks such as the largest BELAZ and MOAZ models of the 1970s. The then large Jiefang CA-390 was powered with a Chinese Chingfa C2956 V12 720 PS (530 kW) diesel engine that produced enough power to match several other similar dump trucks at that time. Its production was targeted as a quarry and mine vehicle, these are designed to carry 105 tonnes of material. Its use was widespread in China during the 1970s and 1980s. This was also the biggest original road vehicle ever made in China at the time. Production ended some time in the late 1970s; some were still in use in the mid-2010s.

Later FAW JMC or also known as Jiefang Motor Company also manufactured Mitsubishi Fuso F-Series heavy lorry 1980s-1990s model range under licence from the Mitsubishi Motors of Japan with some minor changes. Later versions are powered by modern Chinese-made running gear for the Asian/Chinese market; JMC has cooperated and worked closely with Mitsubishi Heavy Industries ever since.

== Specifications ==
Seating (cab): 1+2
Configuration: 6X6
Weight (empty): 12,015.19 lb/5,450 kg
Maximum Load: 9,920.8 lb/4,500 kg (on road), 5,511.56 lb/2,500 kg (cross-country)
Length: 21.93 ft/6.684 m
Width: 7.595 ft/2.315 m
Height: 7.74 ft/2.36 m
Wheel Base: N/A
Track (front/rear): N/A
Ground Clearance: N/A
Top Speed (road): 40.39 mph/65 km/h

== Operators ==
=== Current Operators ===
- Bangladesh
- North Korea
- Vietnam

=== Former Operators ===
- China
- Democratic Kampuchea
