= Amur (company) =

Russian company

AMUR (Ural Automobiles and Motors)
- Native name: ЗАО «Автомобили и моторы Урала»
- Type: Joint Stock Company
- Industry: Automotive
- Founded: 1967
- Defunct: 2012
- Headquarters: Novouralsk, SVE, Russia
- Key people: Afanasjev Yuri Sergeyevich, CEO
- Products: Offroad vehicles, Military vehicles

AMUR (Russian: АМУР - ЗАО Автомобили и моторы Урала, lit. 'Joint-stock company "Ural Automobiles and Motors"') was a Russian company, a former manufacturer of commercial vehicles, located in Novouralsk, a closed town in Sverdlovsk Oblast, Russia.

Prior to 2004, AMUR was called Уральский автомоторный завод (УАМЗ; in English "Ural Automotive Plant" - UamZ).

AMUR declared bankruptcy and ceased operations in 2012 with all assets to be sold off.

== History ==
The Ural Automotor Factory was founded in 1967 as one of the subsidiaries of Zavod imeni Likhachova, more commonly known as ZiL subordinated to the USSR Ministry of Automotive Industry. In 1977, the factory started their own production of vehicles, first of which was a terrain truck ZIL-157. In 1987, the factory expanded its commercial production of trucks to ZIL-130 and ZIL-131, and their common trailers. By 1992, the factory had mastered the production of special equipment vehicles based on its original trucks. In 1992, after the collapse of Soviet Union, the factory was privatized from the Ministry of Automotive Industry and reorganized into the Joint-Stock Company under the name of "Ural Automotor Plants" ((RU-)"UAMZ"). The management did not survive separation from the central economics of former Soviet Union, and in 2002, the factory declared bankruptcy. In 2003, the Bank of Northern Treasury (holding North Prom Cohen) bought the remaining assets from the bankruptcy, and, in 2004, pursued reorganization into CJSC "Ural Automobiles and Motors", abbreviated as "AMUR".

In May 2004, AMUR and India's Tata Motors entered into a contract to build TATA trucks at the factory. Together, they co-produced two models of Tata 407 and Tata LPT 613 branded as Amur-4346. The partners planned on signing a 3-year contract, with the release of up to 5,000 trucks per year. But the project was never realized. In 2007, AMUR planned on establishing a joint production with China's Geely Automobile, to produce models of Geely CK and the Chinese company Great Wall Motors for the production of SUVs ZXAuto Landmark; production trials began in May 2007.

In early 2008, production of passenger cars was suspended, with plans on resuming production in August 2008. AMUR planned to release 3,500 SUV models per year, but the project was discontinued.

On July 16, 2010, AMUR and French manufacturer Renault Trucks entered into a joint venture for the production of light-duty trucks Midlum, under which the production would be placed at AMUR facilities. In the joint venture, AMUR was investing facilities and operating capital, and Renault Trucks was investing its manufacturing know-how and technology.

In July 2011, the joint venture was suspended due to AMUR's financial distress and bankruptcy. Commencing from 2012, AMUR's management is looking for new investors to recover the company.

== New developments ==
The 6 at the exhibition "Industrial Design defense products: expressive severity and reliable functionality," the company "Intrall" (ru:Колун) presented the prototype armored vehicles "Колун" (Cleaver) and "Торос" (Toros) to be manufactured in the UAMZ facility.

== Production ==
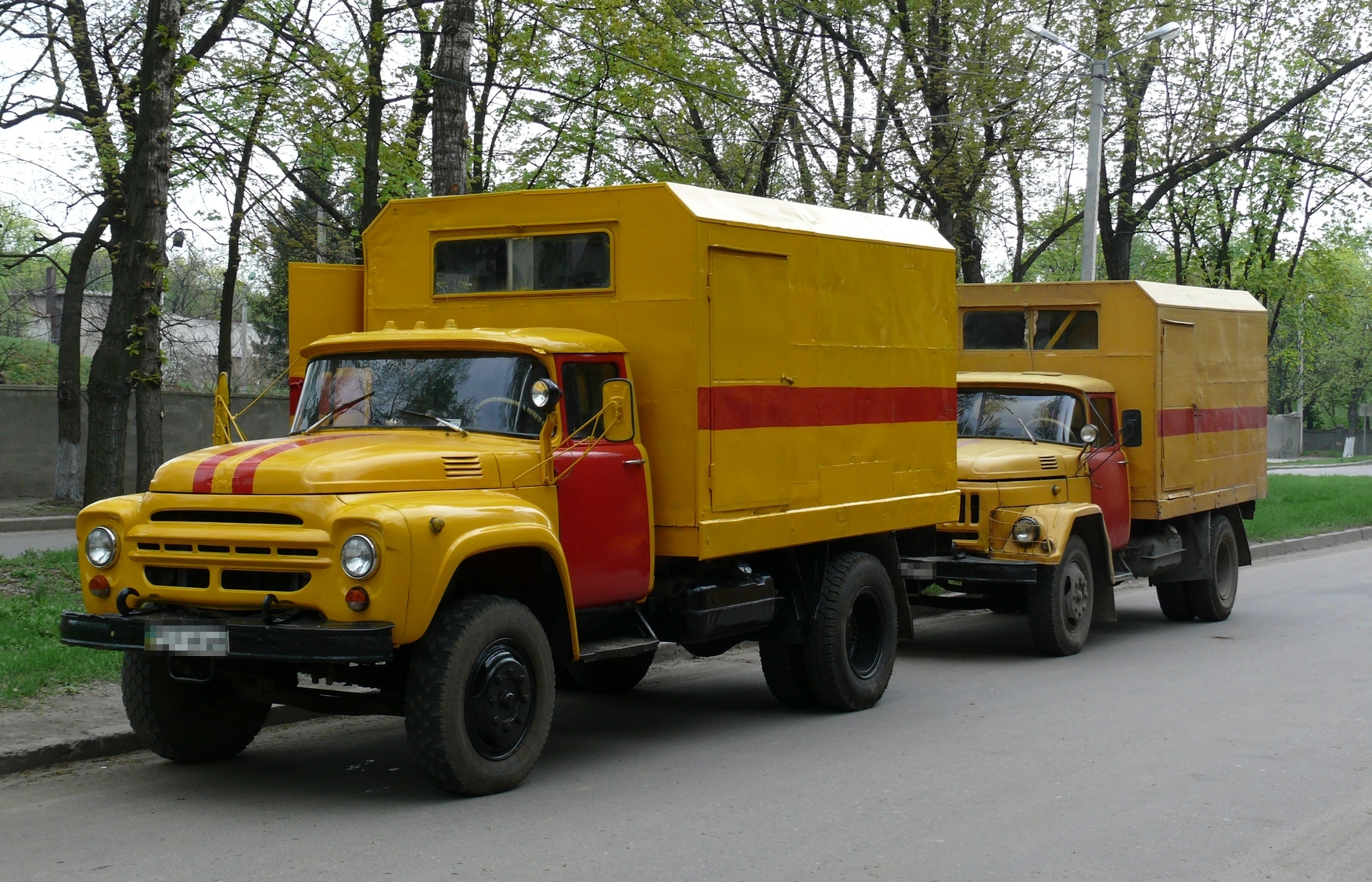
Two AMUR trucks of the Ukrainian Emergency Service. ZIL-130 on the front and UamZ-43140 (ZIL-131) in back.

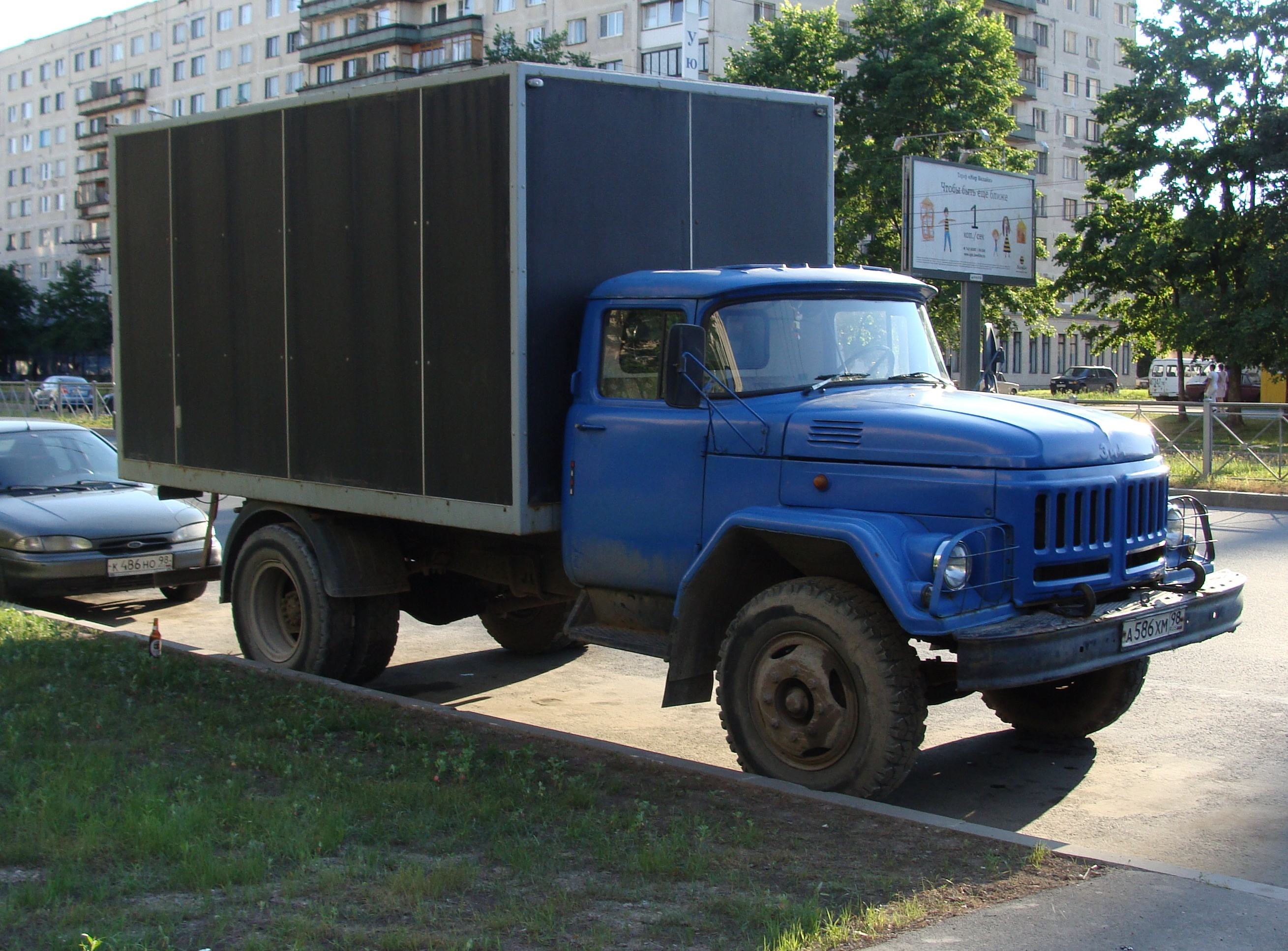
АМУР-531350 (ZIL-130) with a ZIL-131 cab

- 1977–1994 - ZIL-157
- 1987 to 2012 - ZIL-130 (from 2002 known as the AMUR-531350) Amur's 531350 utilizes the cab of the 531340
- 1987 to 2012 - ZIL-131 (from 2002 known as the AMUR-531340)
- 2004–2008 - AMUR-4346
- 2007–2008 - AMUR-531210
- 2007–2008 - Geely Otaka
- 2006–2008 - Zxauto Landmark
