= Chassis configuration =

Motor vehicle chassis information formula

The chassis configuration is a formula that gives information about the wheels of a road vehicle including number of wheels, number of driven wheels and number of steered wheels. A common example is 4x4.

== Formula ==
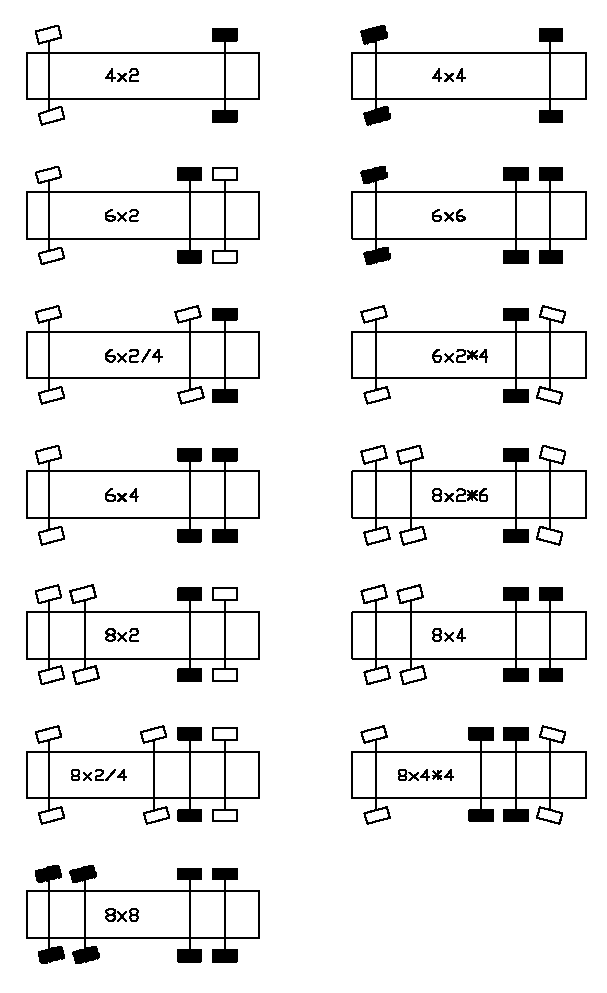
Configurations

The formula is defined as follows:

A × B / C

or

A × B * C

with:

- A = number of wheels (twin-mounted tires count as one wheel)
- B = number of driven wheels
- / = the fore of the rear axles is steered (pusher axle)
- * = the rearmost of the rear axles is steered (tag axle)
- C = number of steered wheels
- - = separates axle groups and/or different axle functions (6x4-2 is 6x6 with undriven rear axle)

Basis is always the standard configuration, meaning a steered front axle and a non-steered driven rear axle. This means: If only the front wheels are steered, the rearmost part of the formula can be left out. The most common example is probably the 4×4 configuration. 6×4*4 is the chassis configuration for a vehicle with six wheels where four wheels are driven, in addition, the two front wheels as well as the rearmost two wheels are steered. In this case it is a three-axled vehicle.

Often the formula A × B × C is used. Even if the information contained by C is needless, it means that only front axles are steered. This can give information about the distribution of axles. For example, provide manufacturers the chassis configuration 8×4×4 to show that the vehicle has two steered front axles and two driven rear axles, compared to the chassis configuration 8×4/4 where the vehicle has one steered front axle, one steered rear axle (the fore axle) and two driven rear axles (the aft axles).

== See also ==
- Category:All-wheel-drive vehicles
- 6x6
