= Novouralsk =

Closed town in Sverdlovsk Oblast, Russia

Novouralsk Новоуральск
- Town
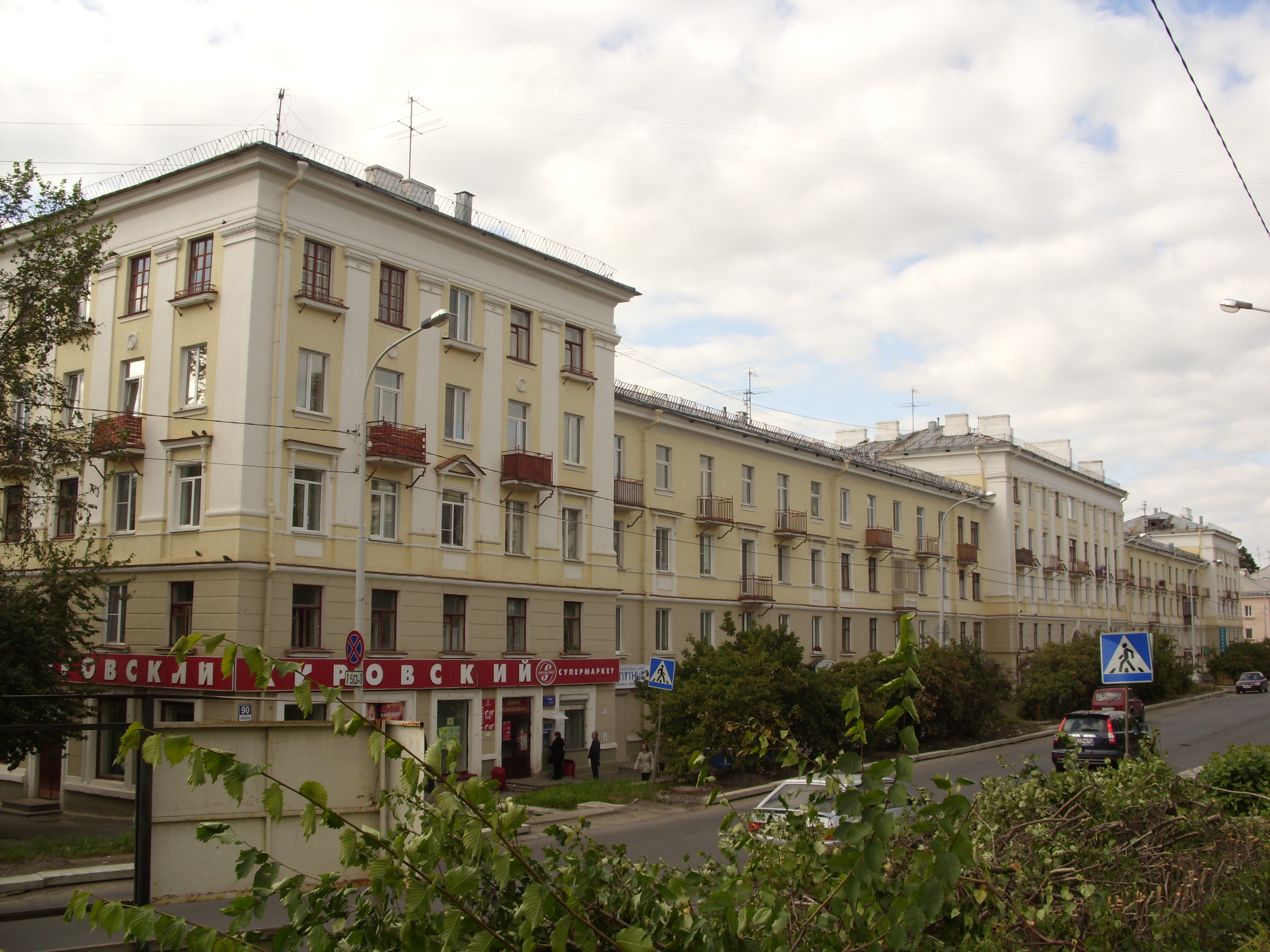
- In Novouralsk

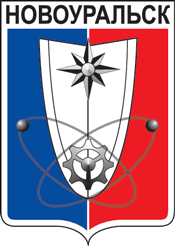
- Flag Coat of arms
- Interactive map of Novouralsk
- Location of Novouralsk Novouralsk (Sverdlovsk Oblast)
- Coordinates: 57°15′N 60°05′E
- Country: Russia
- Federal subject: Sverdlovsk Oblast
- Founded: 1941
- Town status since: 1954

Government
  - Head: Valery Popov
- Elevation: 300 m (980 ft)

Population (2010 Census)
  - Total: 85,522
  - Estimate (2025): 76,982 (−10%)
  - Rank: 195th in 2010

Administrative status
  - Subordinated to: closed administrative-territorial formation of Novouralsk
  - Capital of: closed administrative-territorial formation of Novouralsk

Municipal status
  - Urban okrug: Novouralsky Urban Okrug
  - Capital of: Novouralsky Urban Okrug
- Time zone: UTC+5 (MSK+2)
- Postal code: 624130-624139
- Dialing code: +7 34370
- OKTMO ID: 65752000001
- Website: adm-ngo.ru

Novouralsk (Russian: Новоура́льск, lit. new town in the Urals) is a closed town in Sverdlovsk Oblast, Russia, located on the eastern side of the Ural Mountains, about 70 kilometers (43 mi) north of Yekaterinburg, the administrative center of the oblast. Population: 78,479 (2021 census) 85,522 (2010 census); 95,414 (2002 census).

== History ==
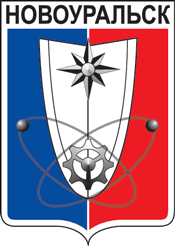
1979 coat of arms of Novouralsk

It was formerly known as Sverdlovsk-44 (Свердло́вск-44). Although it came into being during World War II and was named Novouralsk in 1954, it was kept secret until 1994. It has had closed town status since its establishment.

== Administrative and municipal status ==
Within the framework of the administrative divisions, it is, together with five rural localities, incorporated as the closed administrative-territorial formation of Novouralsk—an administrative unit with the status equal to that of the districts. As a municipal division, the closed administrative-territorial formation of Novouralsk is incorporated as Novouralsky Urban Okrug.

== Economy ==
The town is laid out in a grid format, divided north–south by the central street on which the main administrative building is located. It is subdivided into five residential districts, each covering 10,000 hectares. The town's economy is dominated by the nuclear, automobile, and construction industries.

The Ural Electrochemical Plant's main activities are uranium enrichment and the development of centrifuge technology, as well as the manufacture of instruments and industrial systems for the nuclear industry. The plant began operating in 1949 and was the site of the Soviet Union's first gaseous diffusion enrichment plant. In 1950, certain technical difficulties were resolved and UECP began producing tens of kilograms of 90 percent enriched uranium. The original plant, called D-1, was extended to include plant D-3 in 1951, and plants D-4 and D-5 in 1953. Officials from the Ministry of Atomic Industry once said that Sverdlovsk-44 was the only plant ever used to produce weapons-grade highly enriched uranium.

The plant led the development of Russian centrifuge technology, has used seventh-generation gas centrifuges since 1996 and has developed eighth-generation centrifuges. UECP now produces LEU using centrifuge technology. It is one of four Russian enrichment facilities.

Another major industrial enterprise was the Urals Auto Motor Plant, founded in 1967. It was the subsidiary of the Likhachyov Moscow's Auto Motor Plant. However, the Urals Auto Motor Plant declared bankruptcy in 2000 and was later acquired by Automobiles and Motors of the Urals, a joint Russian-Chinese car manufacturing venture.

== Education and culture ==
Novouralsk's educational facilities include Novouralsks Engineering Physical Institute, Polytechnic College, Medical College, Pedagogical College. There are also twenty-two schools and twenty-seven kindergartens.

Modern-day Novouralsk has two Cultural Centers, three libraries, which are considered the best in the region, a children's arts school and a children's music school, two cinemas, a museum, a puppet theater, and an amusement park. The Central Town Library has become a focus for cultural activities and holds over 800 events annually. The library is fully computerized, and offers free Internet access, and Novouralsk citizens consider their library to be one of the best in Russia. Another library in the town caters solely for children and young people. Cultural life has evolved as the town has grown. The first social club opened in 1947, home to a brass band and various clubs, including drama, followed by cinema and a library in 1949. A music school opened in 1950 and the Operetta Theater in 1951. The Theater can seat up to 600 people, and the company has traveled to dozens of Russian cities, and to practically every town in the Urals. The Puppet Theater Skazka was founded in 1957. The Historical and Area-Study Museum has over 8,000 exhibits.

== Sports ==
The Municipal Concert-Sports Complex was opened in 1998, a modern facility with an artificial ice rink and a hockey pitch. It can be used as an ice stadium or sports or a concert ground with seating for 1,270 people.

The Yava Trophy yacht championship is held in Novouralsk every four years.

== Notable people ==
- Dmitriy Gorbunov (born 1977), darts player
- Alexei Makeyev (born 1991), ice hockey player
- Roman Glavatskikh (born 1983), futsal player
