= ZIL-157 =

Soviet military truck

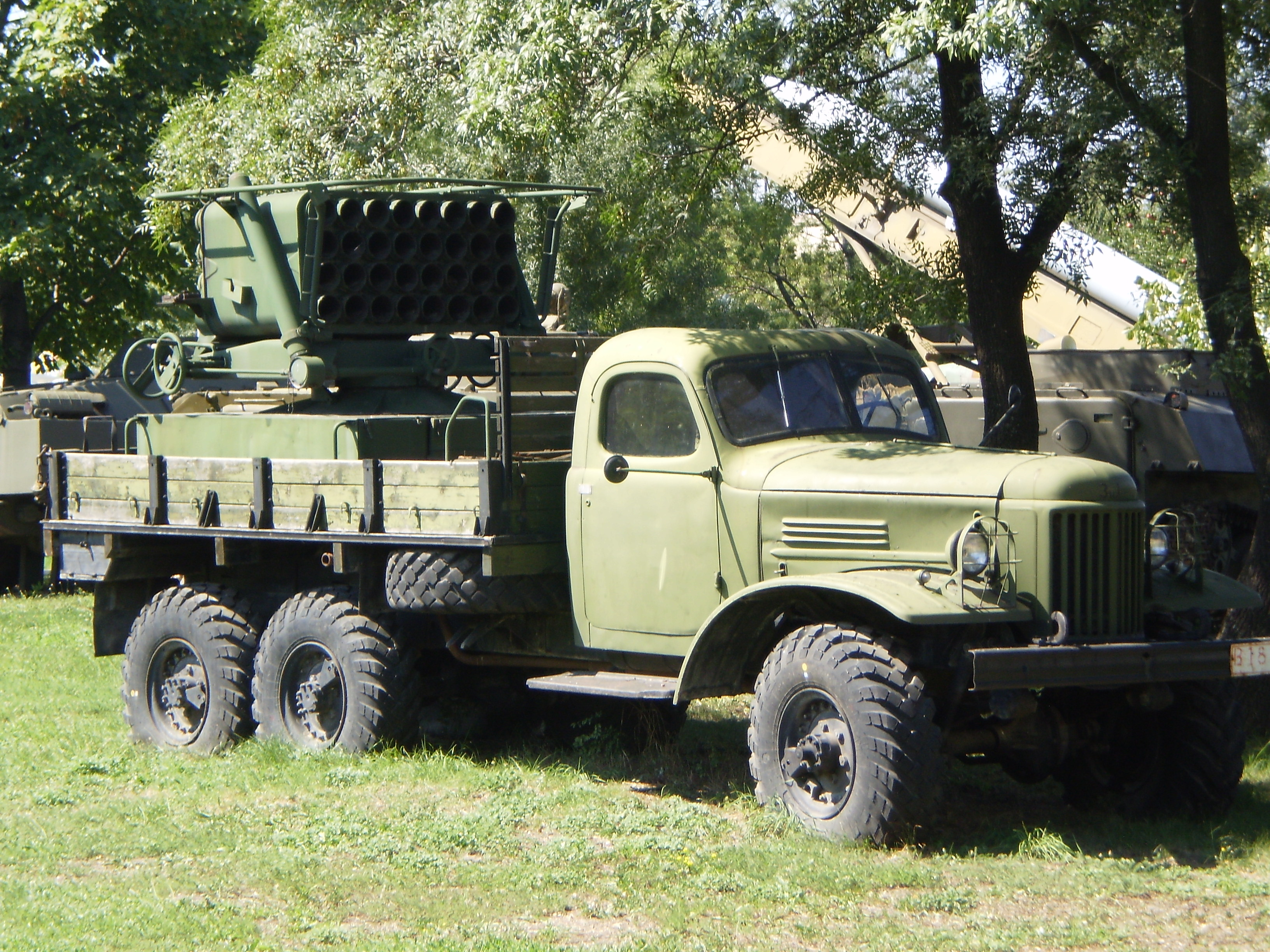

Overview
- Manufacturer: ZiL
- Production: 1958–1961 (mod. ЗИЛ-157); 1962–1978 (mod. ЗИЛ-157К); 1978–1994 (mod. ЗИЛ-157КД)
- Assembly: Soviet Union: Moscow

Body and chassis
- Class: Truck
- Layout: Front engine, 6×6
- Related: ZIL-164

Powertrain
- Engine: 5.55 L ZIL-157, 104 hp (78 kW) I6
- Transmission: 5-speed manual

Dimensions
- Wheelbase: 3,665 + 1,120 mm (144.3 + 44.1 in)
- Length: 6.93 m (22 ft 9 in)
- Width: 2.32 m (7 ft 7 in)
- Height: 2.74 m (9 ft 0 in)
- Curb weight: 5,540 kg (12,214 lb)

Chronology
- Predecessor: ZIS-151
- Successor: ZIL-131

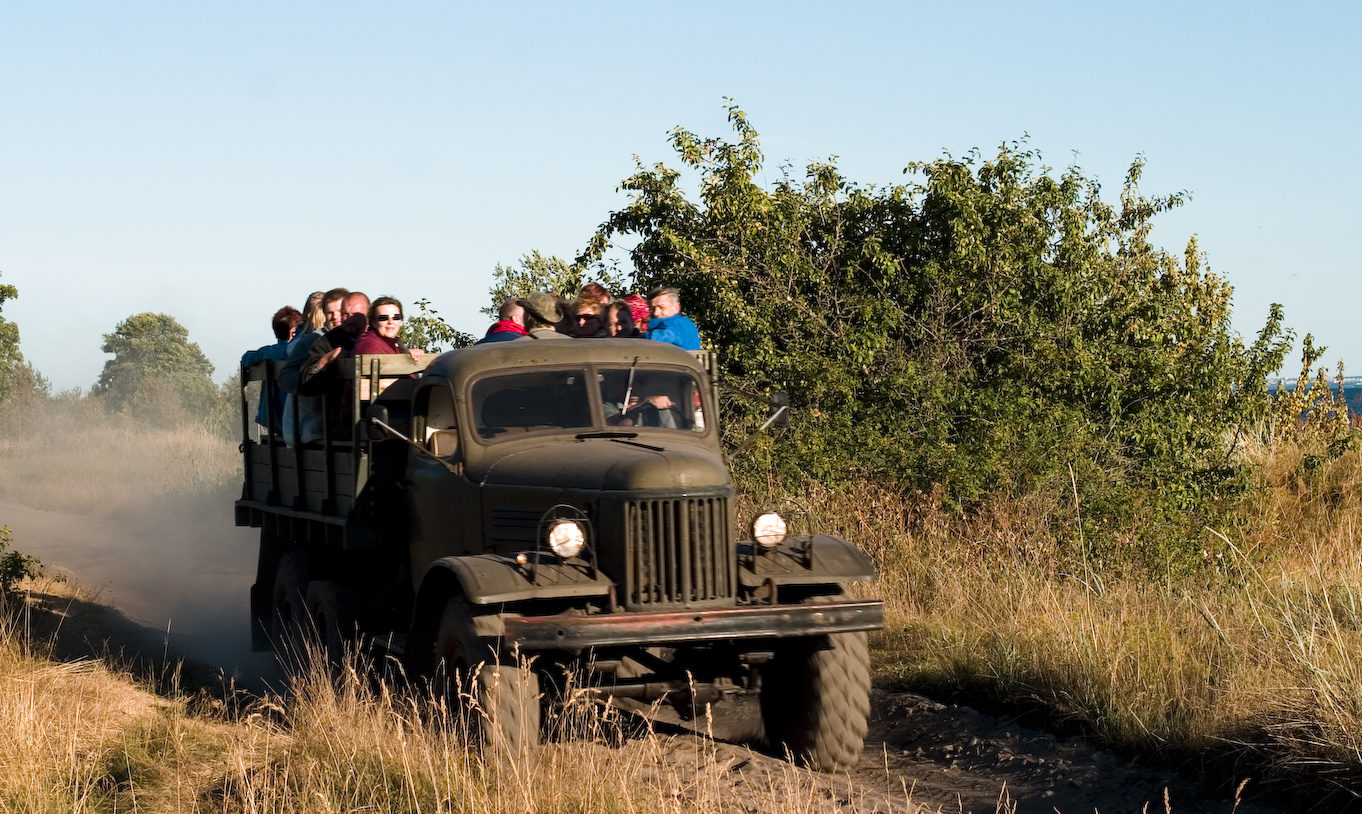
ZIL-157 on Naissaar island, Estonia

The ZIL-157 is a general-purpose 2 1/2-ton 6×6 truck, produced at the Likhachev plant in the Soviet Union from 1958 to 1977, when production was transferred to the Amur plant, since the Likhachev plant wanted to focus more on modern trucks, such as the ZIL-131 range. Nevertheless, production of the ZIL-157 trucks continued even after the fall of the Soviet Union, but eventually ended in 1994.

== History ==
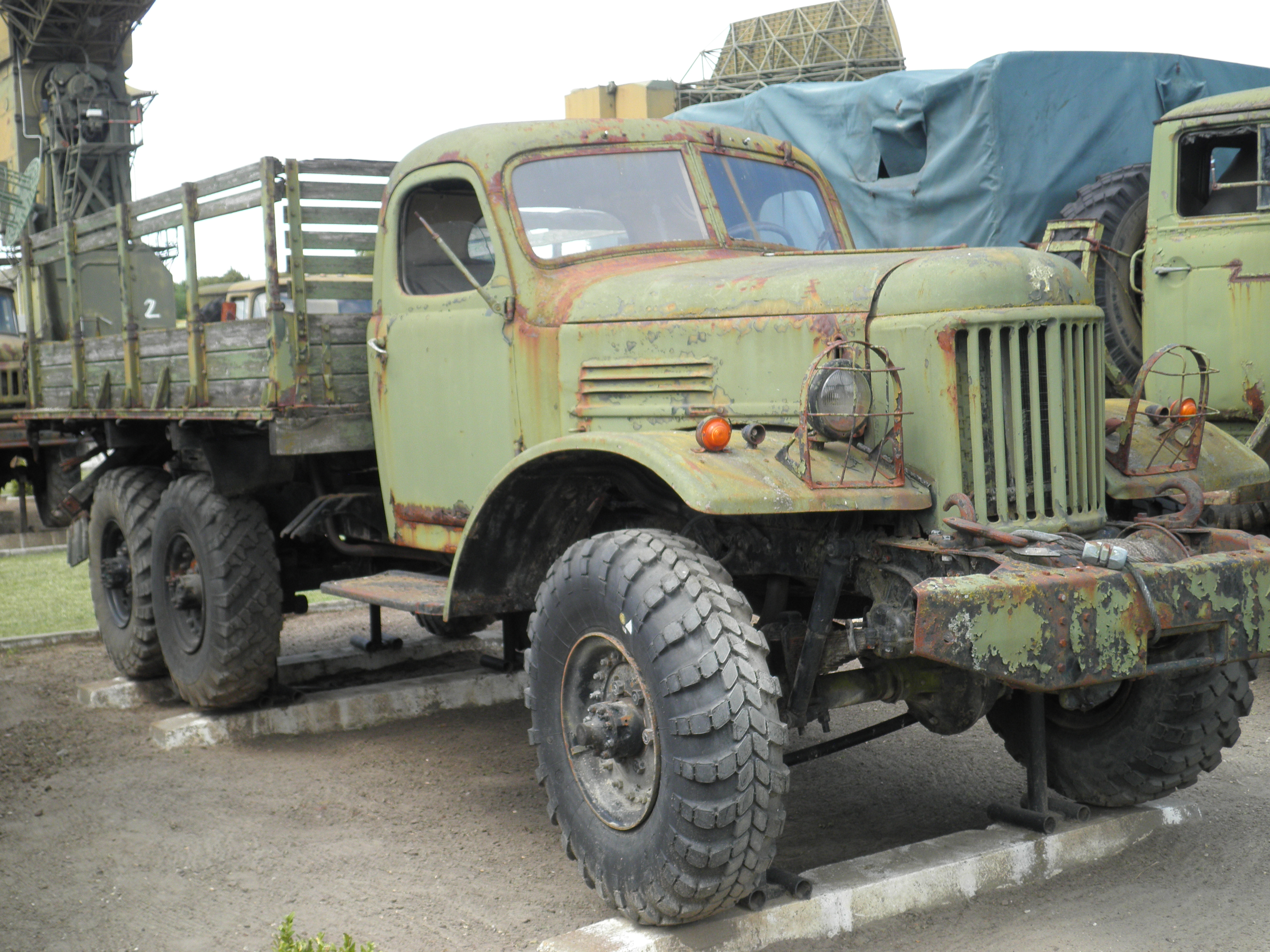
ZIL-157, formerly used by the Hungarian Army (2011)

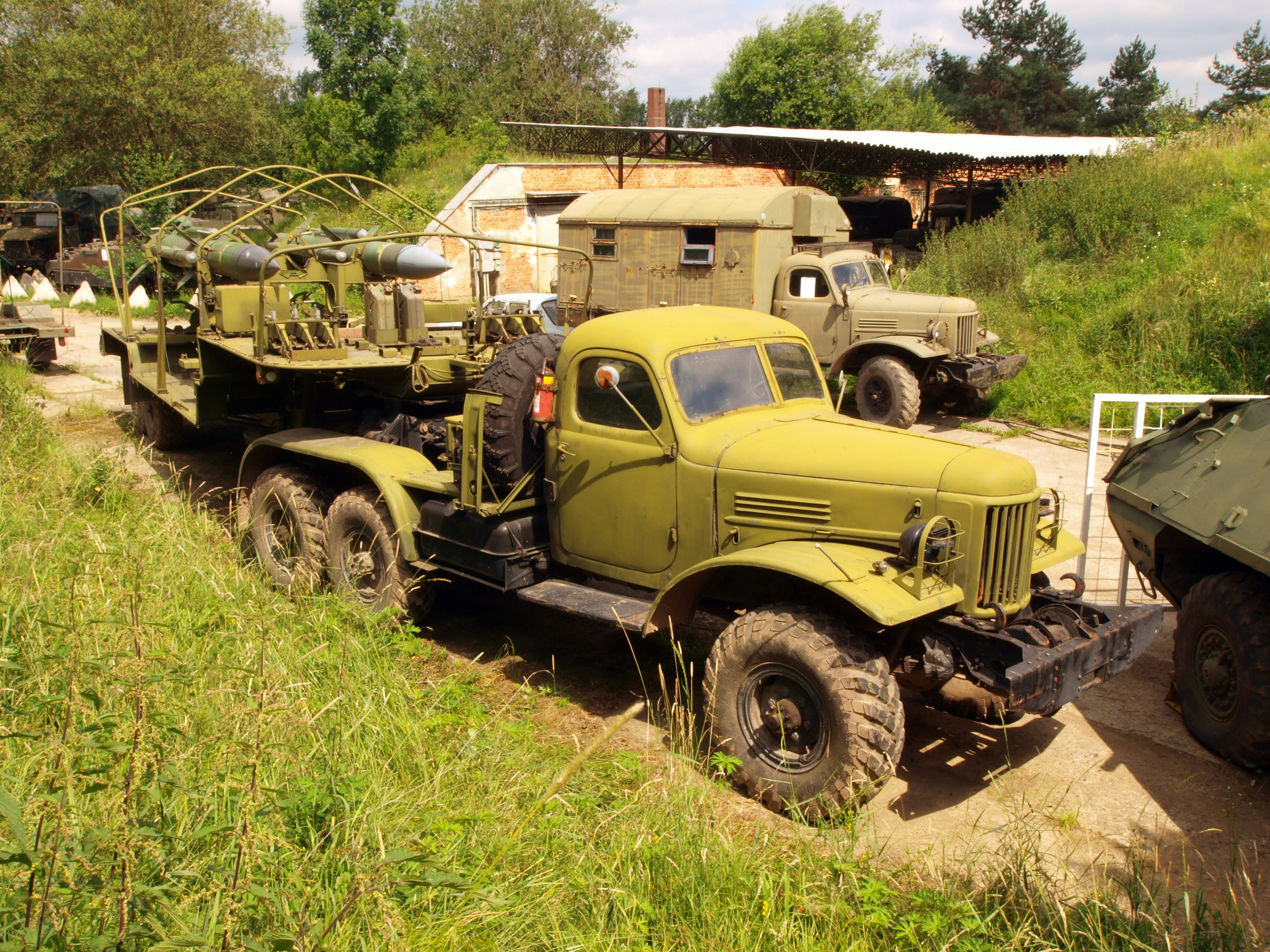
ZIL-157V tractor unit with semi-trailer for rocket transport (2012). In the background a ZIL-157 with box body

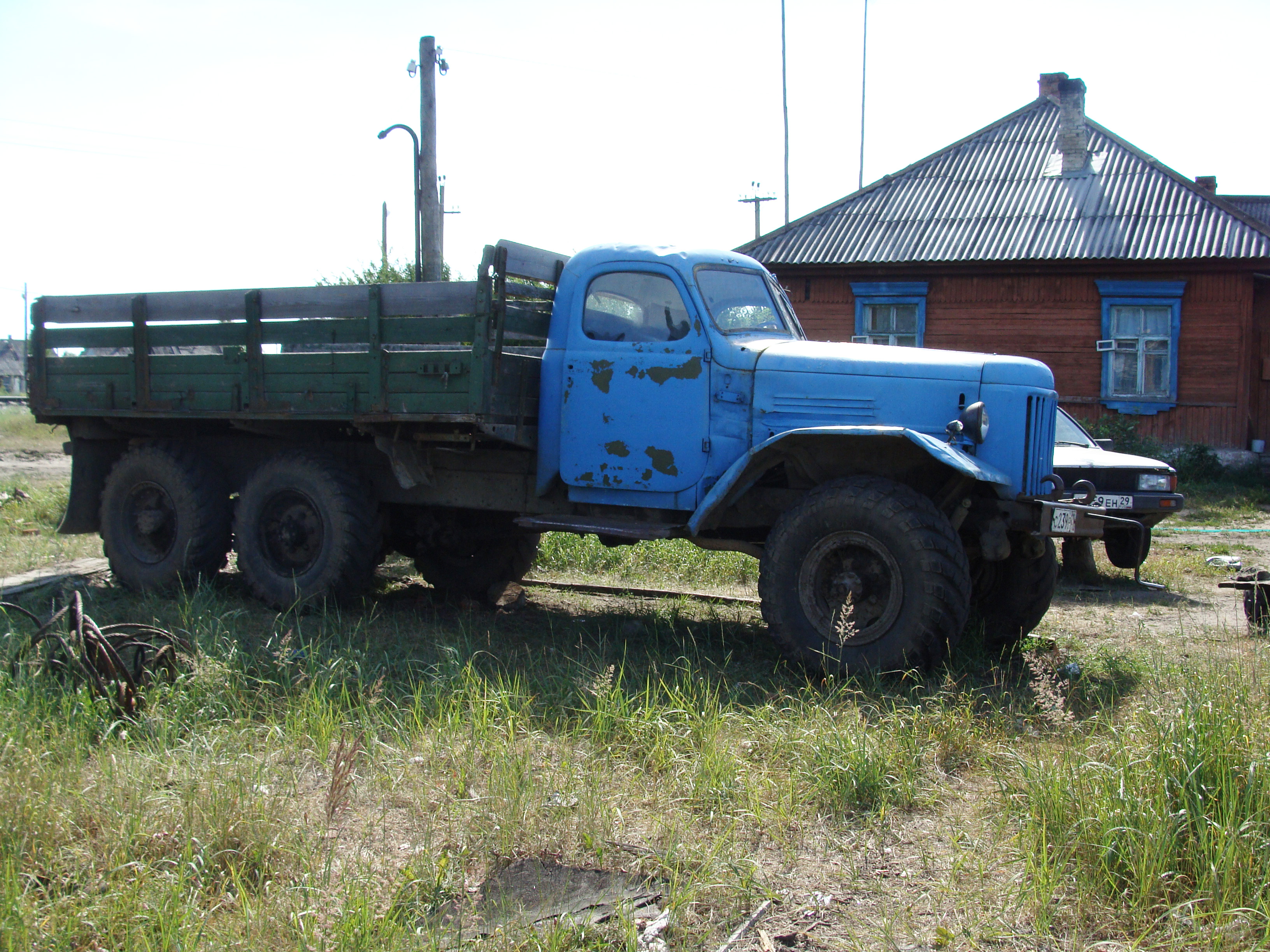
Civilian ZIL-157 (2010)

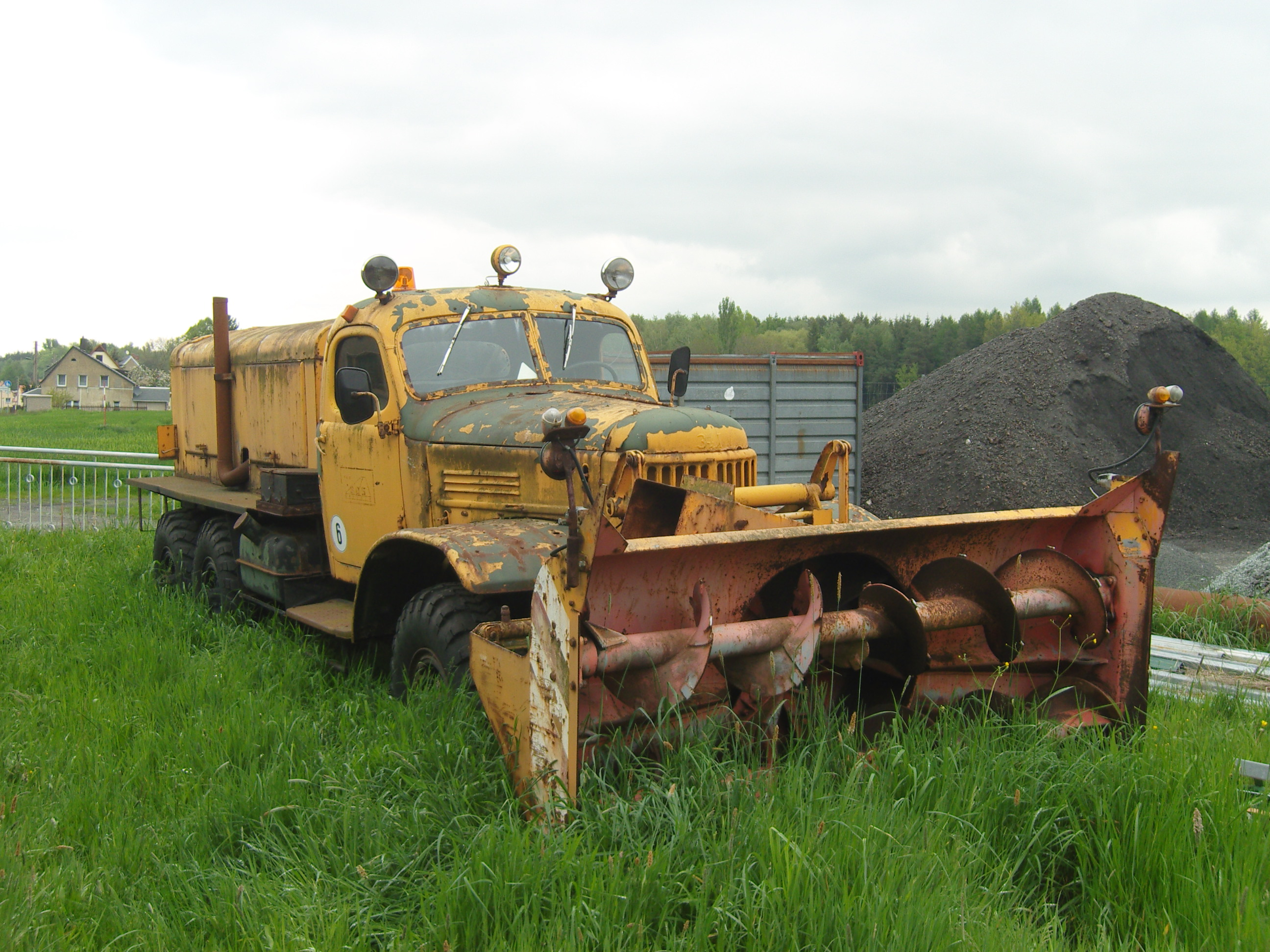
Snow blower D-470 on ZIL-157K (2014)

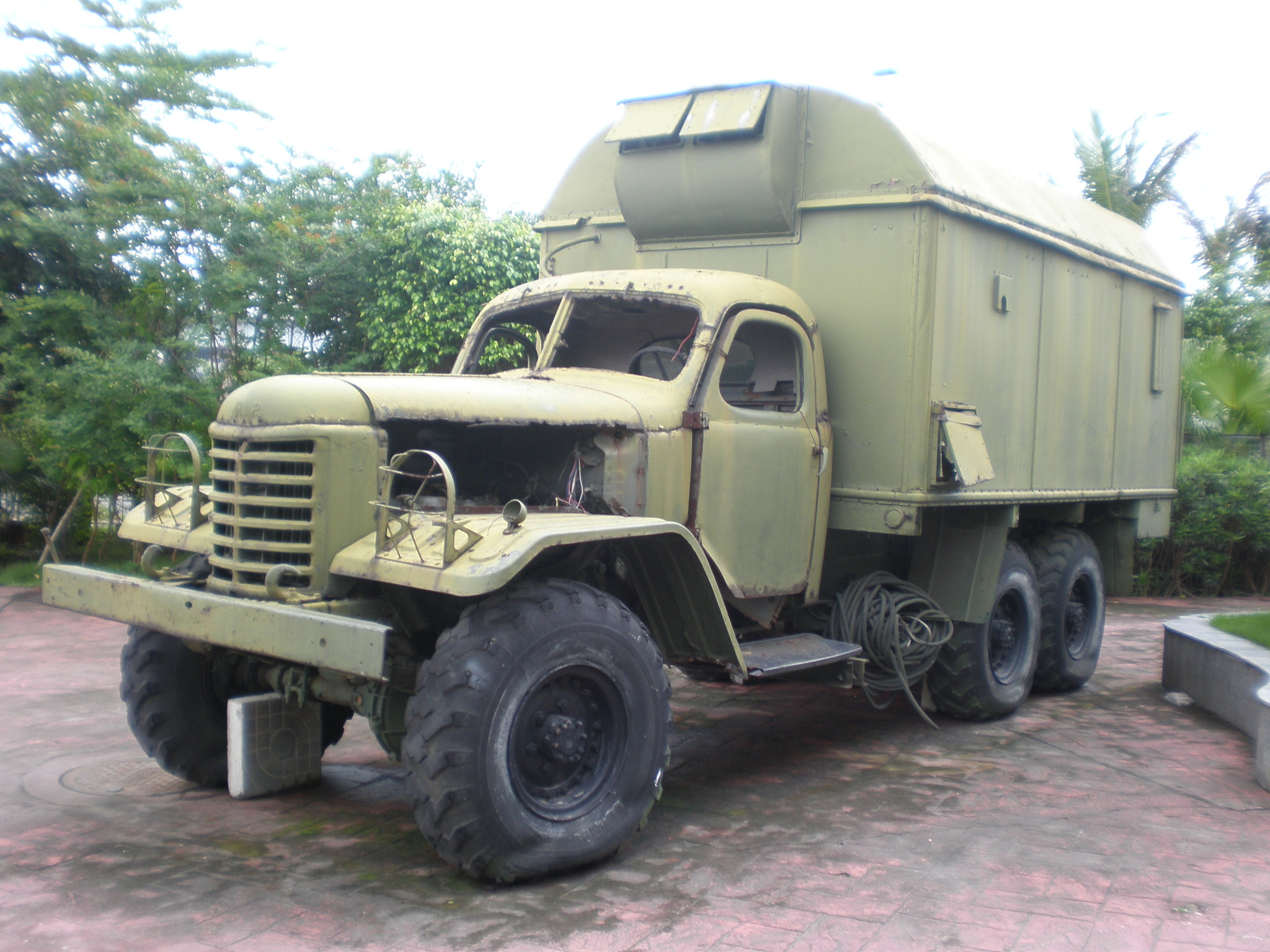
Jiefang CA-30 with radar case, the Chinese copy of the ZIL-157

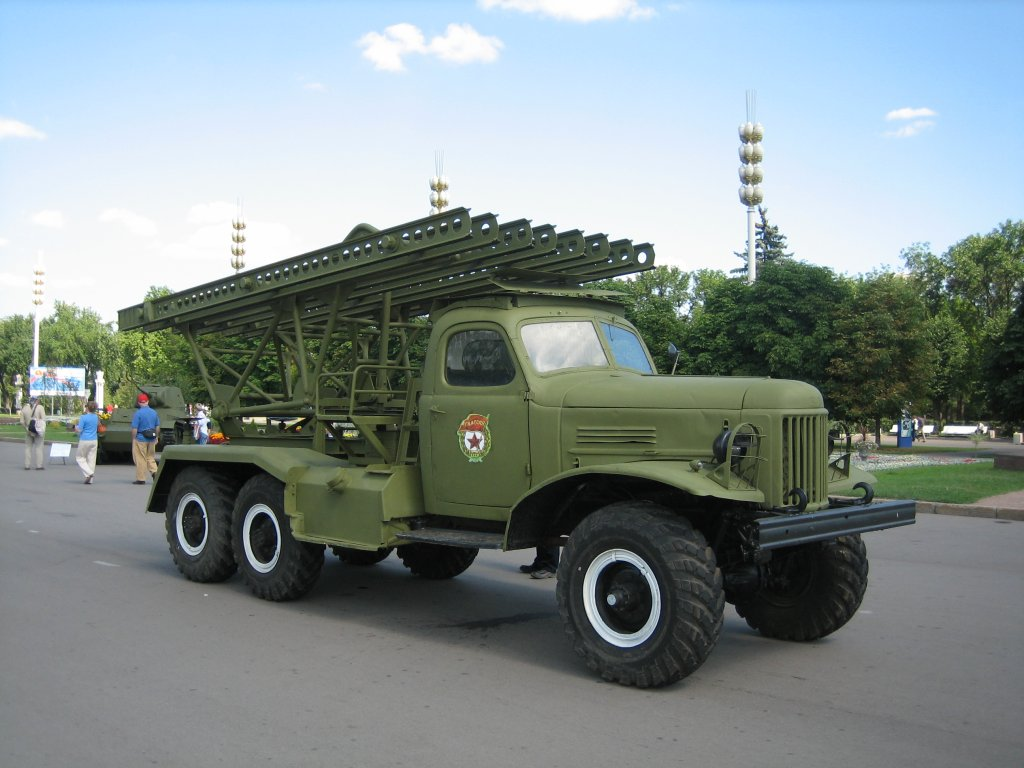
BM-13-16 multiple rocket launcher on a ZIL-157 (2006)

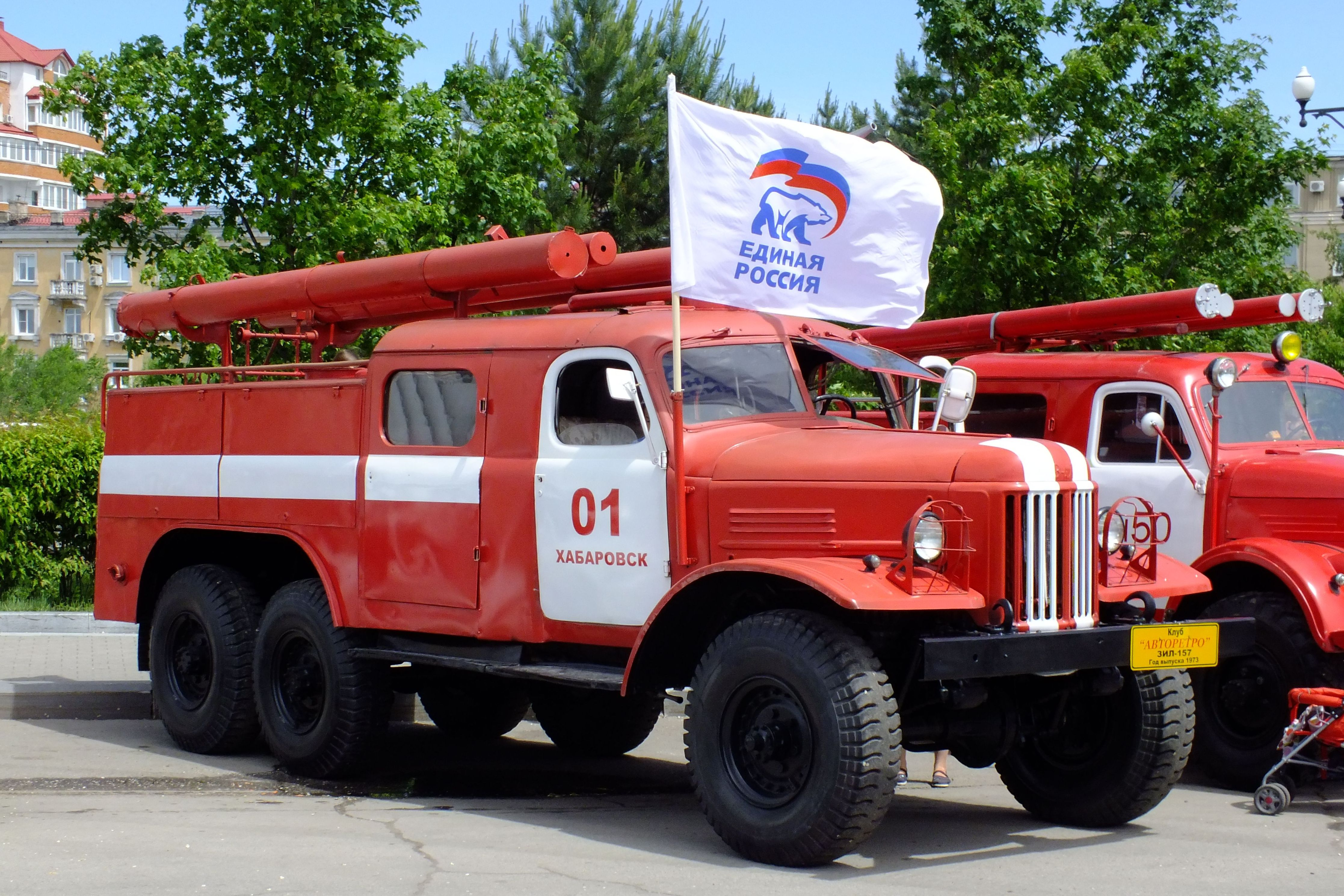
Fire engine with double cab based on the ZIL-157 (2014)

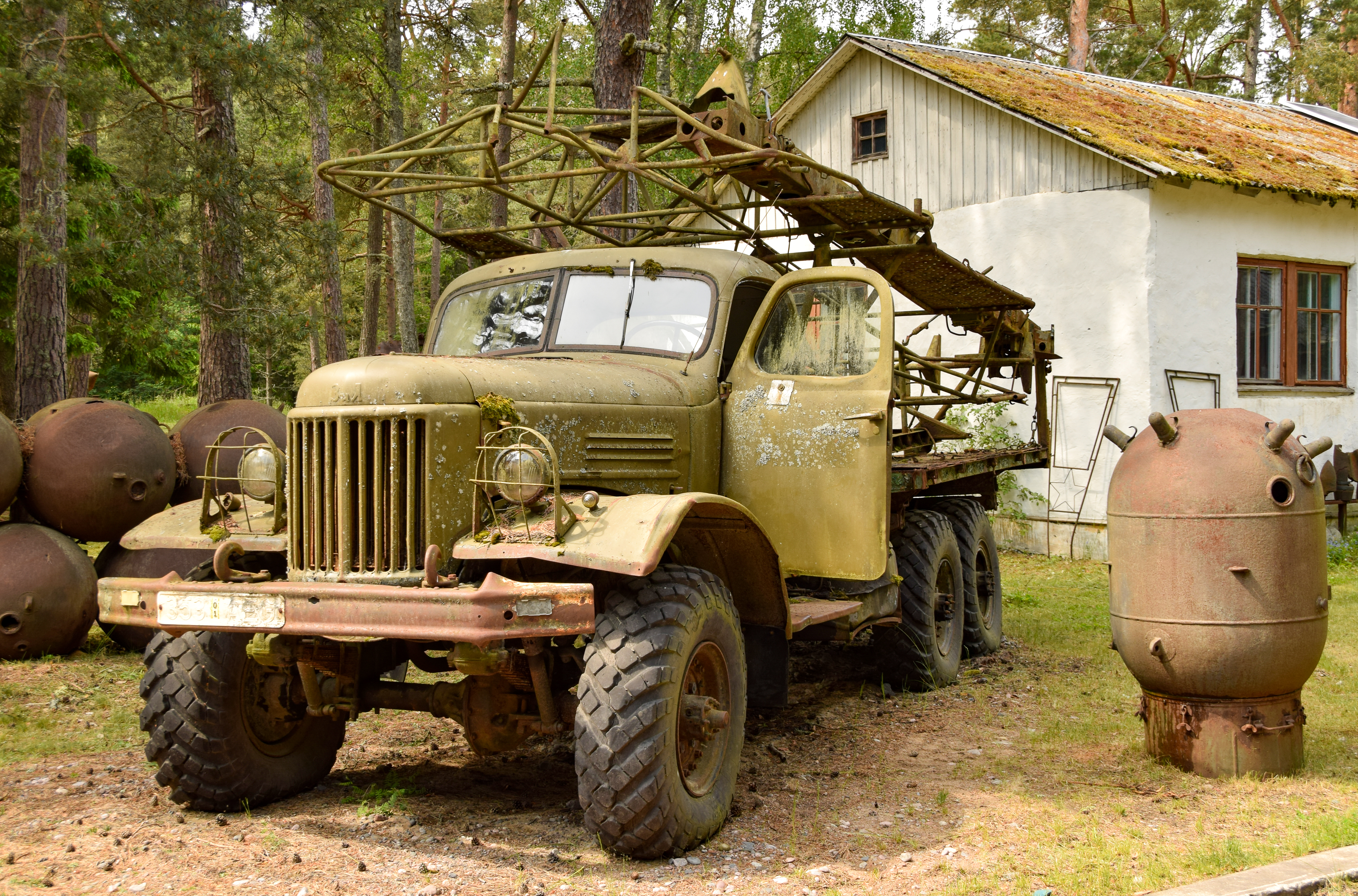
ZIL-157 S-125 Neva missile carrier

Some time after the start of serial production of the ZIS-151, the revision of the ZIS-151 began. The new project was given the title ZIS-157. By 1956, two prototypes had been produced, which had some technical innovations compared to the ZIS-151. This also included tires specially developed for this vehicle, which were particularly wear-resistant due to the use of several layers of material. The spare wheel was no longer mounted behind the driver's cab, but under the truck, which allowed the frame and thus the entire truck to be shortened. A tire pressure control system was also installed, which significantly improved off-road capability.

Series production began on September 18, 1958 in Moscow. In the course of de-Stalinization, however, it was now renamed ZIL-157, as the plant was renamed in 1956 from "Zavod imeni Stalina" to "Zavod imeni Likhacheva". In the same year, the truck won an award at the World Expo in Brussels.

In 1961, a new version was introduced. The ZIL-157K had a more powerful engine, which it inherited from the ZIL-131 as well as the rest of the powertrain. This model was built until the cessation of production in Moscow in 1978. From that point on, the Uralsky Avtomotorny Zavod (UAmZ) took over the production of the truck. Here it was reworked again and designated ZIL-157KD. The payload increased by 500 kg to five tons, and three tons of cargo could still be transported off-road. Production officially continued until 1992, with vehicles still being assembled from existing parts until 1994. A total of 797,934 ZIL-157 trucks were produced by both manufacturers in 36 years of construction.

The ZIL-157 truck, like its predecessors, was mostly intended for use by the Soviet Army, but a number was also made for the civilian sector and for export; it was also popular with forestry companies, and was thus also used as a log truck, specifically in the ZIL-157V tractor trailer version.

In the Soviet Union, the vehicle received several nicknames from the population, including "Crocodile" because of the long bonnet and characteristic radiator grille.

== Variants ==
- ZIL-157 (ЗИЛ-157) - cargo truck, produced 1958 - 1961
- ZIL-157B - Prototype version of ZIL-157 without the central tire pressure system.
- ZIL-157E - Chassis-cab version of ZIL-157 with two fuel tanks, and no spare wheel bracket.

- ZIL-157EE, ZIL-157ET - Export versions of ZIL-157E.
- ZIL-157EG - Version with shielded electrical equipment.

- ZIL-157EGE - Export version with shielded electrical equipment for temperate climates.
- ZIL-157EGT - Export version with shielded electrical equipment for tropical climates.

- ZIL-157G - As ZIL-157, but with shielded electrical equipment.

- ZIL-157GE, ZIL-157GT - Export versions of ZIL-157G.

- ZIL-157K (ЗИЛ-157К) - cargo truck, produced 1962 - 1978. Modernized version of ZIL-157.

- ZIL-157KYe - Export version of ZIL-157K for temperate climates.
- ZIL-157KYu - Export version of ZIL-157K for tropical climates.

- ZIL-157KD (ЗИЛ-157КД) - 5-ton cargo truck, produced since 1978. Modernized version of ZIL-157K.
- ZIL-157KDA - Cab-chassis version.
- ZIL-157KDE - Cab-chassis version; modernized ZIL-157KE.
- ZIL-157KDG - Version with shielded electrical equipment; modernized ZIL-157KG.
- ZIL-157KDM - Prototype flatbed version, with the engine and transmission from the ZIL-157KD, the cab from the ZIL-130 and ZIL-131 and the frame and flatbed from the ZIL-131. Produced in 1984.
- ZIL-157KDV (ЗИЛ-157КДВ) - tractor unit, produced since 1978. Modernized version of ZIL-157KV.

- ZIL-157KDVE, ZIL-157KDVT - Export versions of ZIL-157KDV.

- ZIL-157KE - Cab-chassis version; modernized ZIL-157E.

- ZIL-157KEE, ZIL-157KET - Export versions of ZIL-157KE.
- ZIL-157KEG - Version with shielded electrical equipment.

- ZIL-157KEGL - Light chassis (for heavy vans) with shielded electrical equipment.
- ZIL-157KEGE - Export version with shielded electrical equipment for temperate climates.
- ZIL-157KEGT - Export version with shielded electrical equipment for tropical climates.

- ZIL-157KE1 - Version of ZIL-157KE with a generator.

- ZIL-157KE1E, ZIL-157KE1T - Export versions of ZIL-157KE1.

- ZIL-157KG - Modernized version of ZIL-157G.

- ZIL-157KGE, ZIL-157KGT - Export versions of ZIL-157KG.

- ZIL-157KV (ЗИЛ-157КВ) - tractor unit, produced 1962 - 1978. Modernized version of ZIL-157V.

- ZIL-157KVG - Version with shielded electrical equipment.
- ZIL-157KVE, ZIL-157KVT - Export versions of ZIL-157KV.

- ZIL-157L - Prototype power-steering version of ZIL-157. Produced in 1958, cancelled due to front suspension and steering malfunctions.
- ZIL-157V - Tractor-trailer version. Produced 1958 - 1961.

- ZIL-157VG - As ZIL-157V, but with shielded electrical equipment.
- ZIL-157VE, ZIL-157VT - Export versions of ZIL-157V.

- ZIL-157Ye - Export version of ZIL-157 for temperate climates.
- ZIL-157Yu - Export version of ZIL-157 for tropical climates.
- ZIL-4311 - Prototype replacement for the ZIL-157. Produced in 1976.
- KMM (колёсный механизированный мост КММ) - Soviet military bridgelayer on ZIL-157 chassis

== Operators ==
- Albania: Jiefang CA-30
- Bangladesh: Jiefang CA-30 variants from China
- China: Licensed-produced as Jiefang CA-30
- Finland
- Indonesia: Indonesia has some ZIL-157 stored in Dirgantara Mandala Museum, possibly bought in 1961
- Iraq
- North Korea
- Poland
- Soviet Union
- Syria
- Ukraine: Seen in use during the Russian invasion of Ukraine
- Vietnam: Jiefang CA-30 variants from China

== See also ==
- Katyusha rocket launcher
