= ZIL-131 =

Soviet army truck

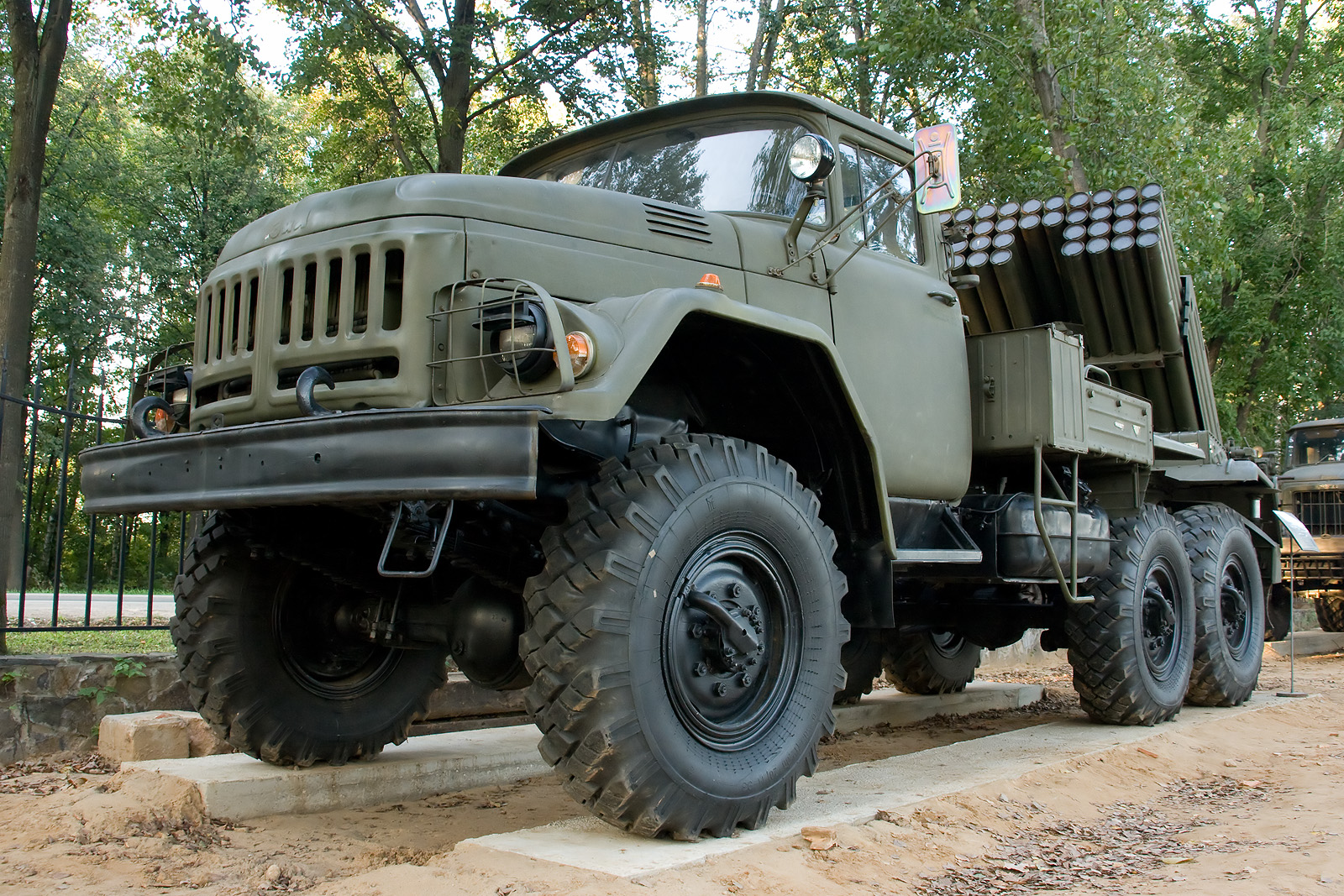

Overview
- Manufacturer: ZiL
- Also called: Amur-531340
- Production: 1964–2012
- Assembly: Soviet Union / Russia: Moscow

Body and chassis
- Class: Truck
- Related: ZIL-130; ZIL-133

Powertrain
- Engine: 6.0L ZIL-130 V8
- Transmission: 5-speed manual

Dimensions
- Wheelbase: 3,975 mm (156.5 in)
- Length: 7,040 mm (277.2 in)
- Width: 2,500 mm (98.4 in)
- Height: 2,480 mm (97.6 in)
- Curb weight: 6,700 kg (14,771 lb)

Chronology
- Predecessor: ZIL-157
- Successor: ZIL-4334

The ZIL-131 is a general purpose 3.5 tonne 6x6 army truck designed in the Soviet Union by ZIL. The basic model being a general cargo truck. Variants include a tractor-trailer truck, a dump truck, a fuel truck, and a 6x6 for towing a 4-wheeled powered trailer.

The ZIL-131 was introduced in 1966; it is a military version of the ZIL-130, and the two trucks share many components. The ZIL-131 6x6 has the same equipment as the GAZ-66 and Ural-375D.

The ZIL-130/131 was in production at the AMUR truck plant (ZIL-130 as the AMUR-531350 and ZIL-131 as the AMUR-531340), with both gasoline and diesel engines, from 1987 until 2012 when AMUR shut down and filed for bankruptcy.

== Specifications ==
- Cab Design: Forward Engine
- Seating Capacity (cab): 3
- Curb weight: 6700 kg
- Payload: 5000 kg plus trailer 5000 kg (on road), or 3,500 kg plus trailer 4000 kg off road.
- Suspension: solid axles with leaf springs.
- Engine: V8 gasoline (carburetor) ZIL-130
- Displacement: 6,960 cc (bore 3.94", stroke 4.36")
- Compression Ratio: 6.5:1.
- Top speed: 80 km/h
- Brakes: drums, with pneumatic control.
- Stopping distance (at 35 km/h): 40 ft (12 m)
- Length: 23 ft 1 in (7.04 m)
- Width: 8 ft 2 in (2.49 m)
- Height: 8 ft 2 in (2.49 m) (cab)/ 9 ft 9 in (2.97 m) (transport body)
- Wheelbase: 10 ft 10 in (3.30 m)+4 ft 7 in (1.40 m)
- Track front/rear: 6 ft (1.83 m)/5 ft 11 in (1.80 m)
- Tire measures: 12.00x20
- Maneuverability: turning circle 33'5.6", approach angle 36°, departure angle 40°, max. ascent angle 31° (with 3,750 kg (8,267 lb) load), ground clearance 13 in (330 mm), overcome ford 4 ft 7 in (1.40 m)
- Tires: 305R20
- Tire Pressure: 7.1-60 p.s.i.(controlled).
- Fuel tanks: 2x45 gal.
- Fuel economy: 5.9 mpg_{‑US} (40 L/100 km; 7.1 mpg_{‑imp}) (city), 50 to 100 liters/100 km (cross-country).
- Price $7,300 to $8,300 USD
- transmission: 5 m, 2-speed transfer case

== Variants ==
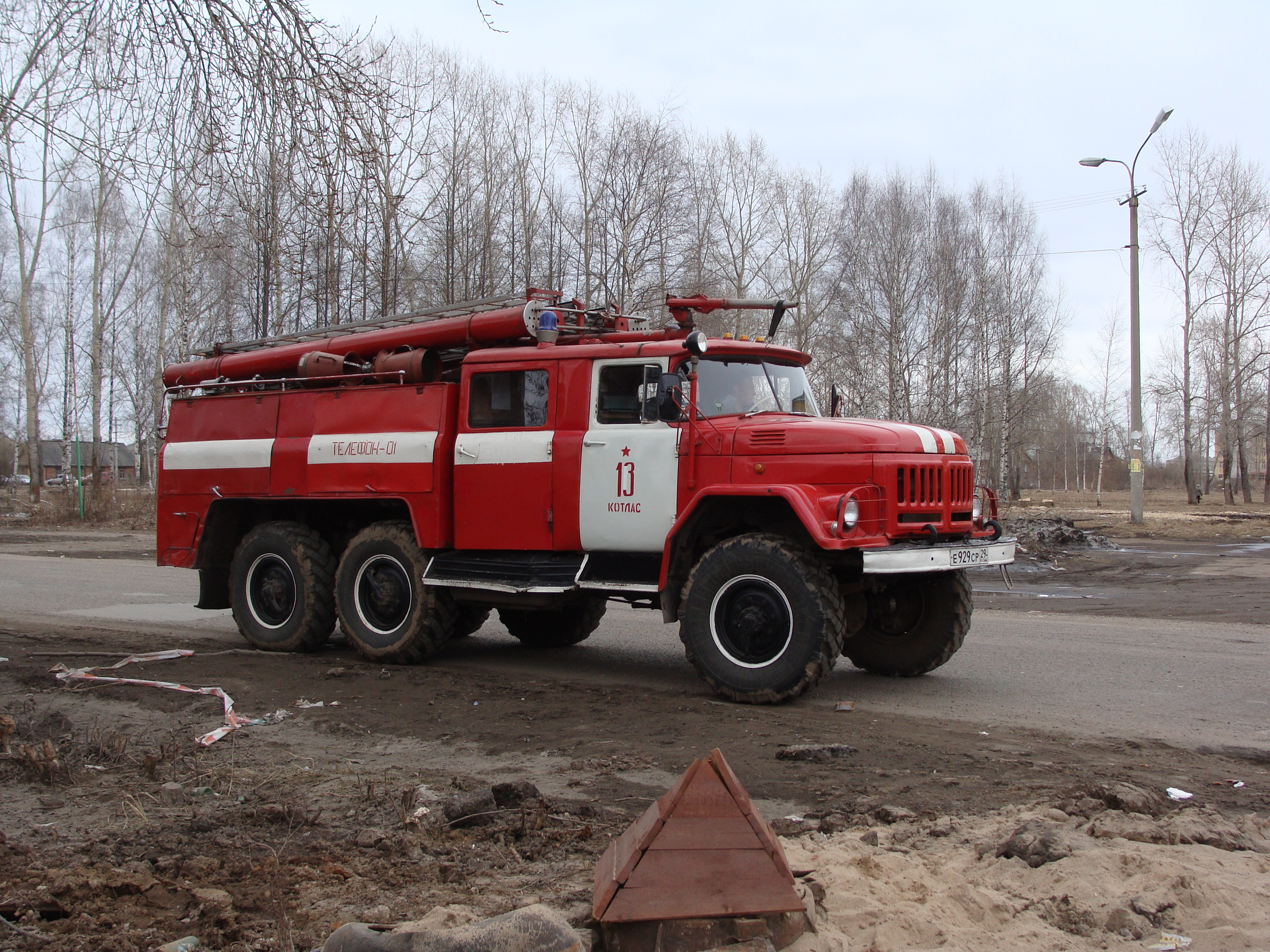
ZIL-131-based fire engine

- ZIL-131 (ЗиЛ-131) - 3.5-ton cargo truck

- ZIL-131N (ЗиЛ-131Н) - 3.75-ton cargo truck with new ZIL-5081 engine, mass production started since December 1986

- ZIL-131V (ЗиЛ-131В) - tractor unit
- ATZ-3,4-131 (АТЗ-3,4-131) - fuel tanker
- 9P138 (9П138) - a 36-tube variant of the BM-21 "Grad" rocket launcher on ZIL-131.

ZIL-131 were equipped with diesel engine ZIL-0550 made by Ural Automotive Plant since 2002.

== Users ==
- Afghanistan
- Albania
- Angola
- Armenia
- Azerbaijan
- Belarus - Armed Forces of Belarus
- Bulgaria
- Cuba
- Czech Republic
- Egypt
- Ethiopia
- Finland
- Georgia
- Kazakhstan
- Kyrgyzstan
- Moldova – Armed Forces of the Republic of Moldova
- Mongolia – Mongolian Armed Forces
- North Korea
- Poland: Only specialized variants in use.
- Russia
- Slovakia
- Syria
- Tajikistan
- Transnistria
- Turkmenistan
- Ukraine – Ukrainian Armed Forces
- Uzbekistan
- Vietnam

=== Former users ===
- Czechoslovakia
- German Democratic Republic
- Hungary – Hungarian Armed Forces
- Nicaragua – Sandinista Popular Army
- Soviet Union
- Yugoslavia

== Gallery ==
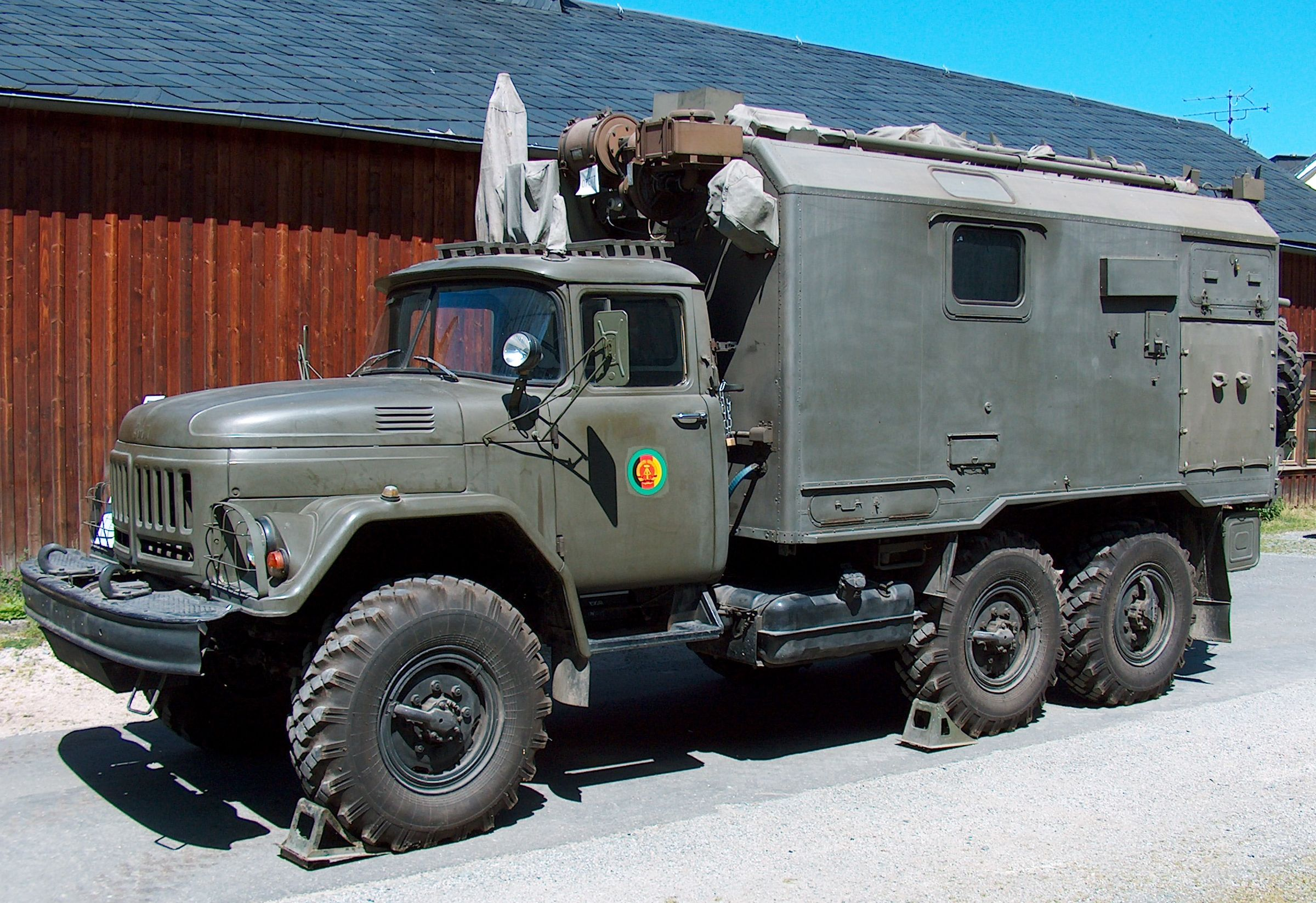
A ZIL-131 of the East German Grenztruppen.

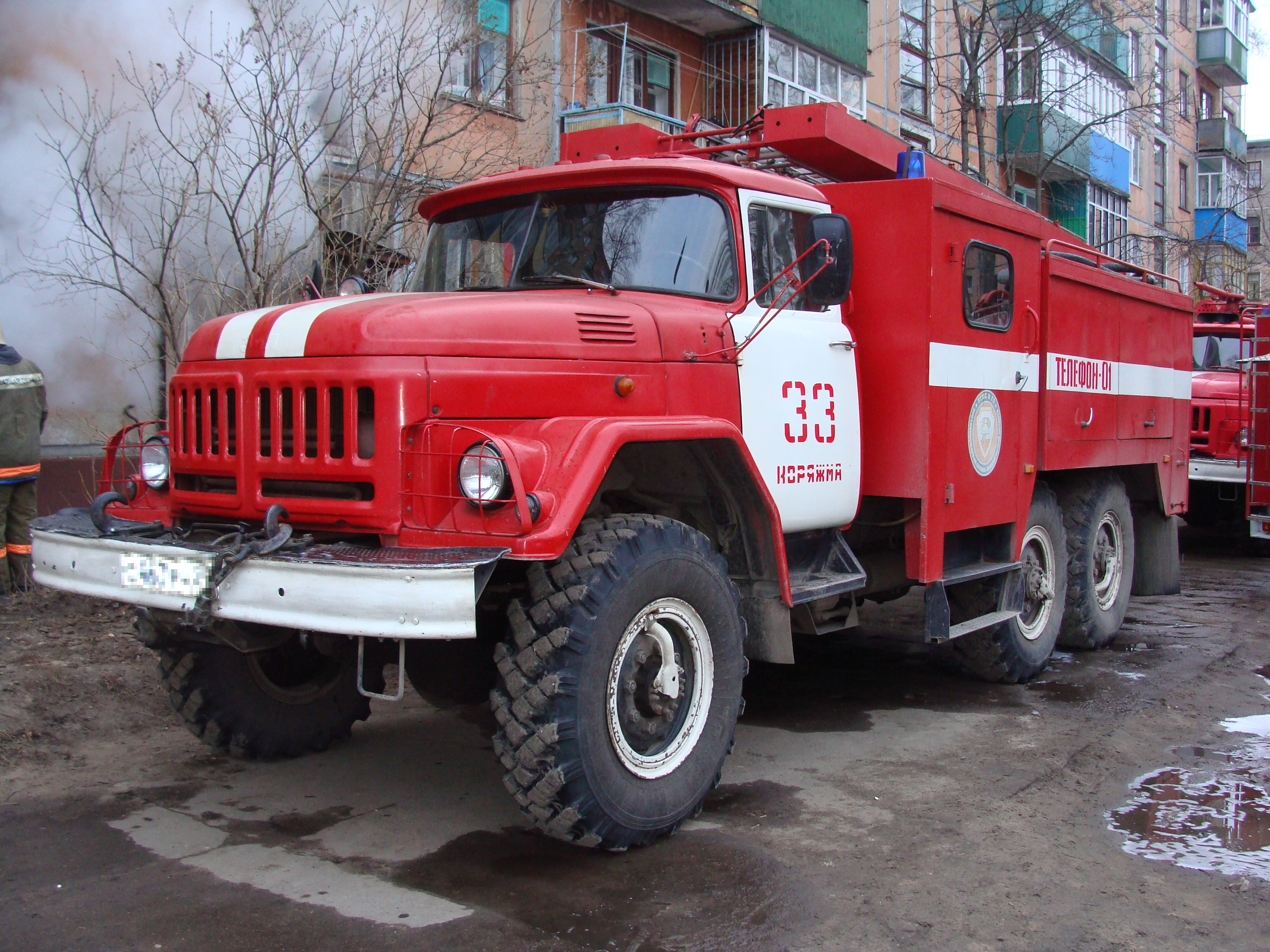
ZIL-131 based АЦ-3,0-40(131)М9-АР-01 firetruck

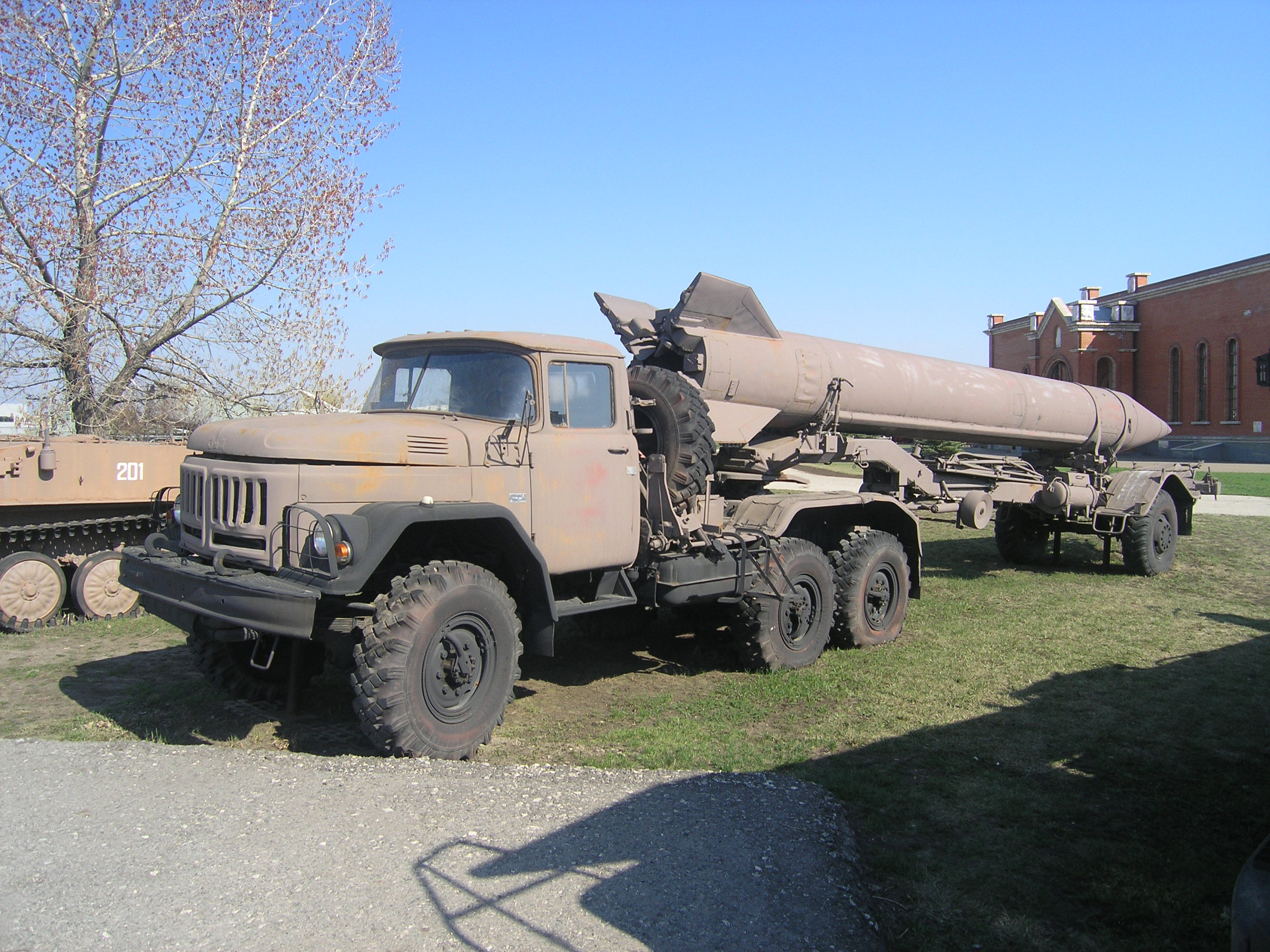
ZIL-131V tractor with R-17 Elbrus SCUD missile

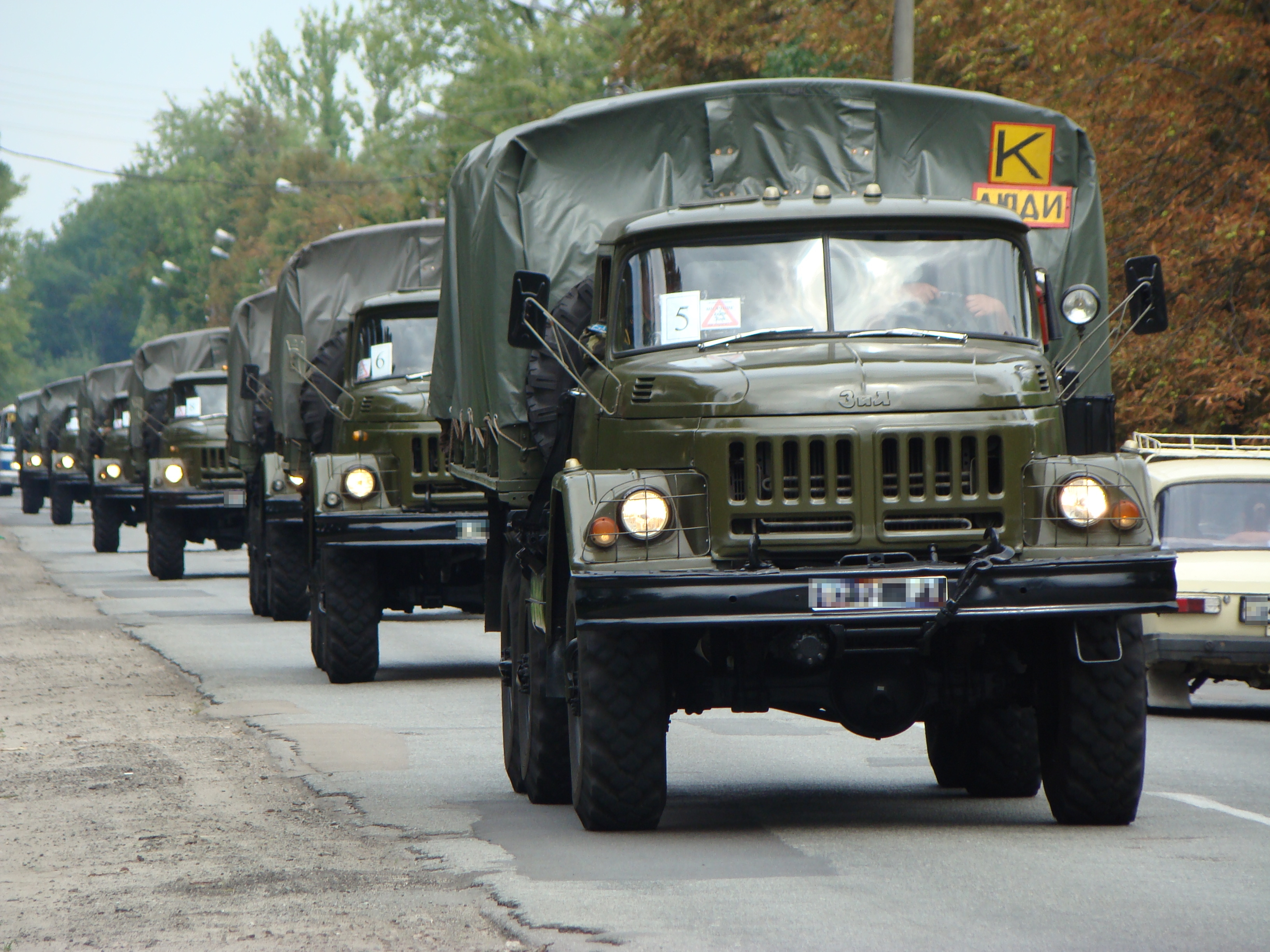
Ukrainian Army ZIL-131

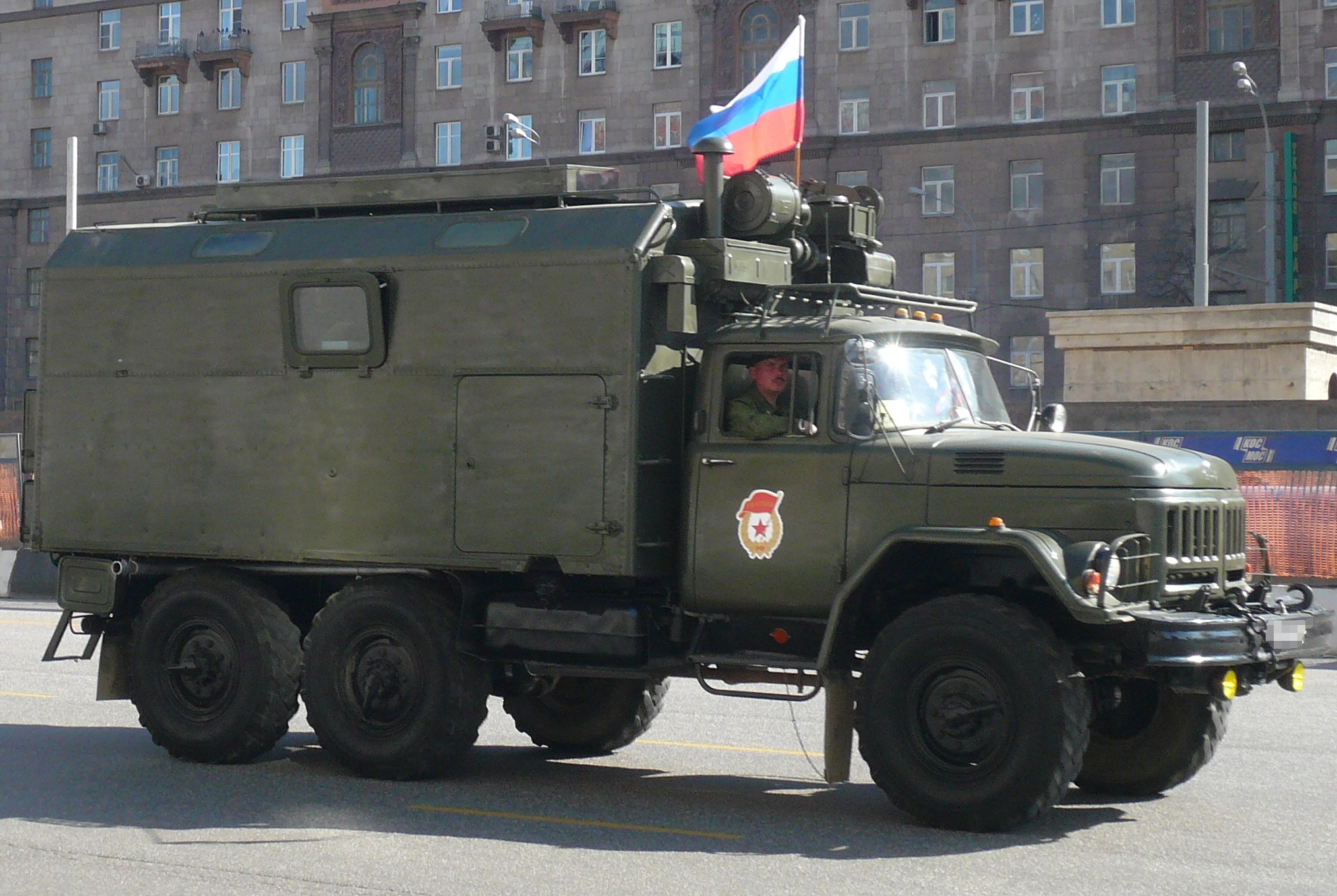
ZIL-131 Command post

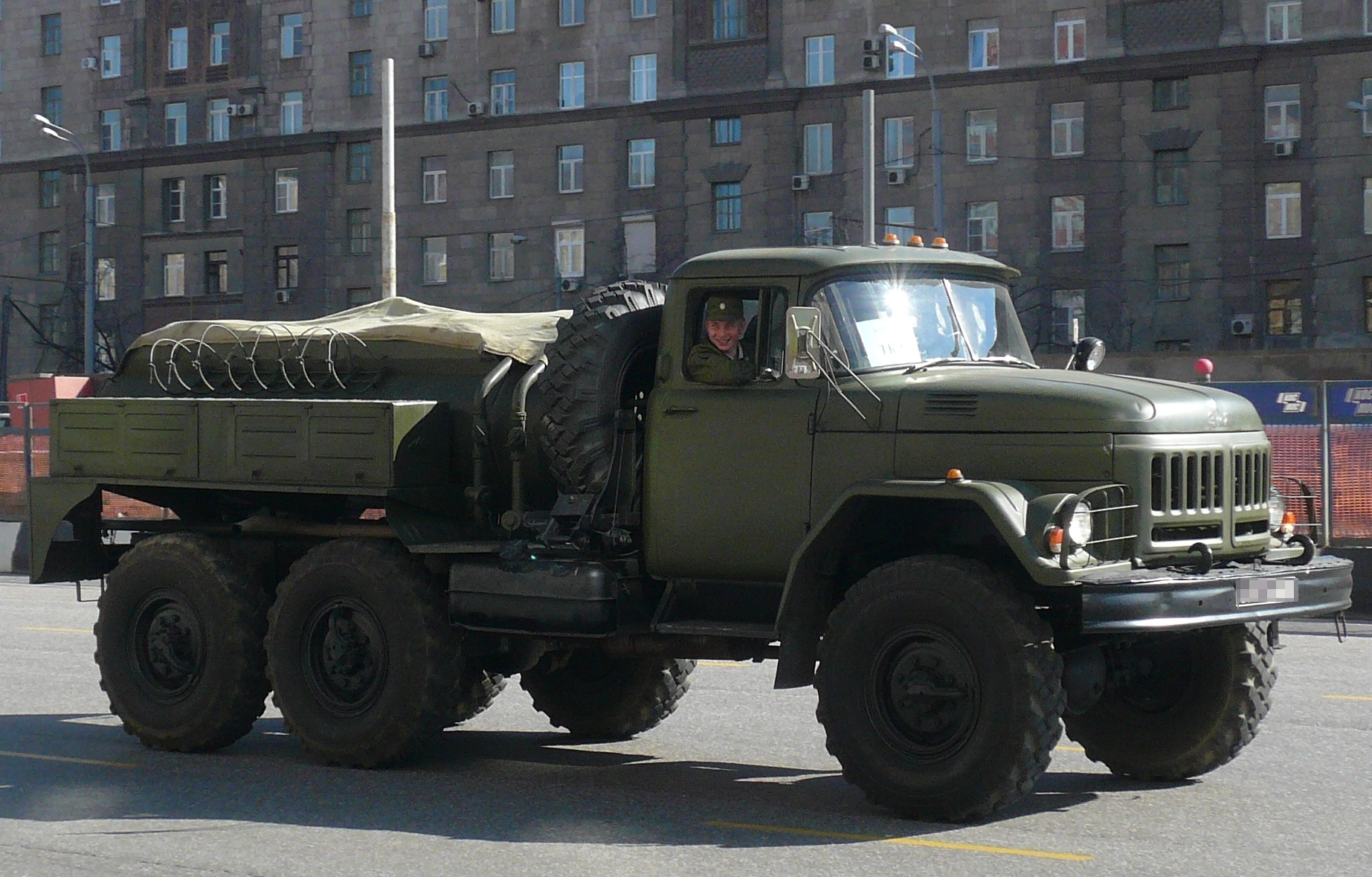
ZIL-131 tanker

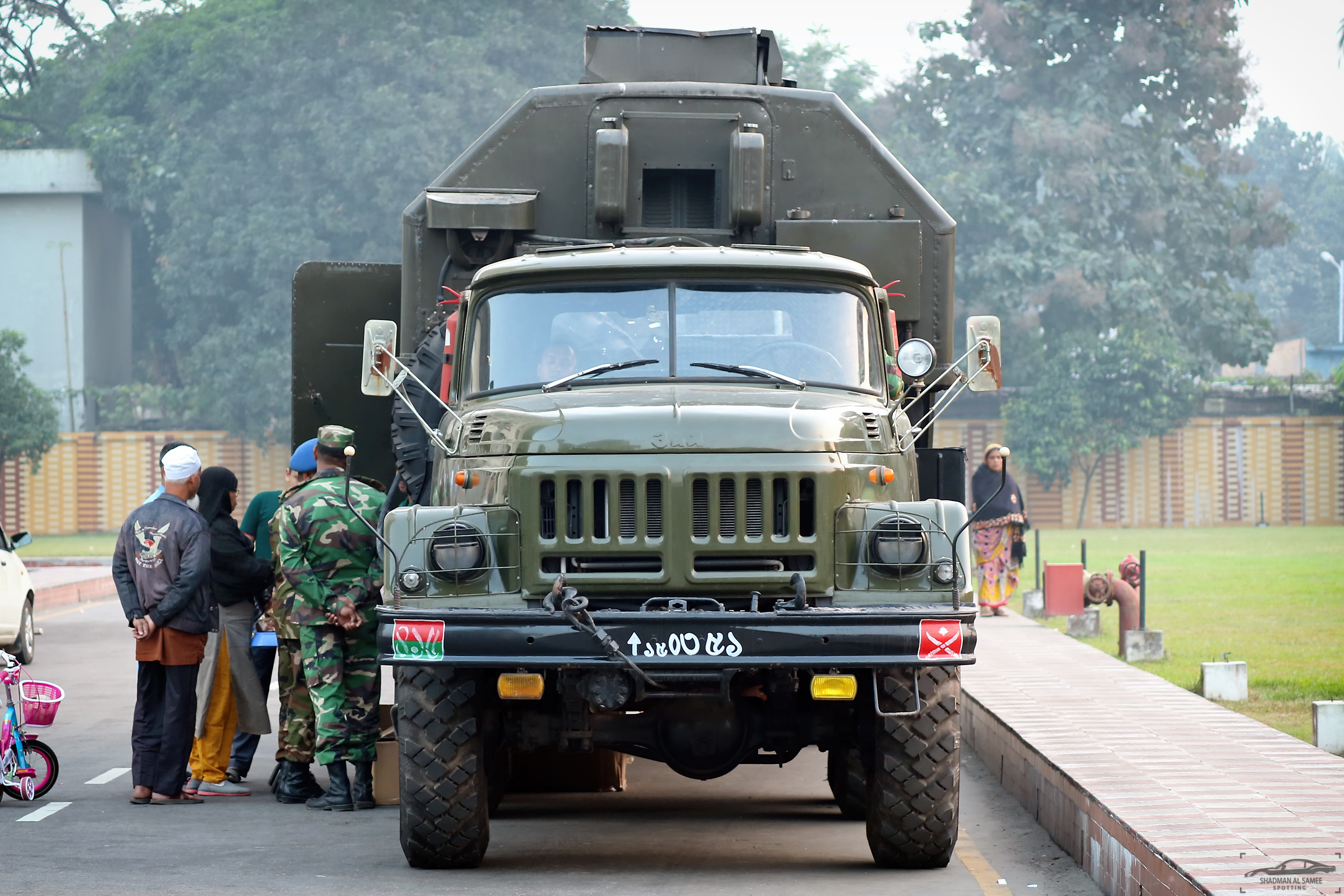
Bangladesh Army Mobile Field Bakery System with ZIL-131

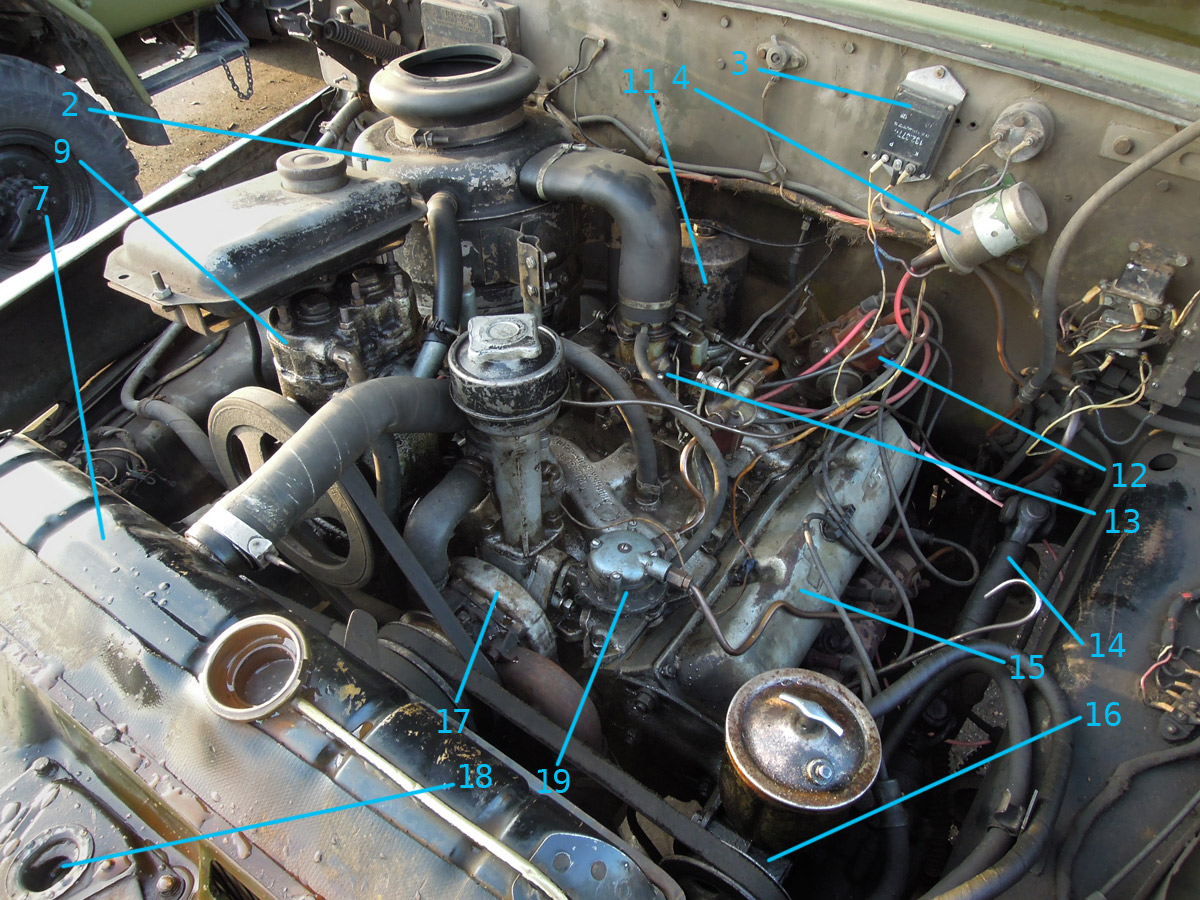
Left side of engine

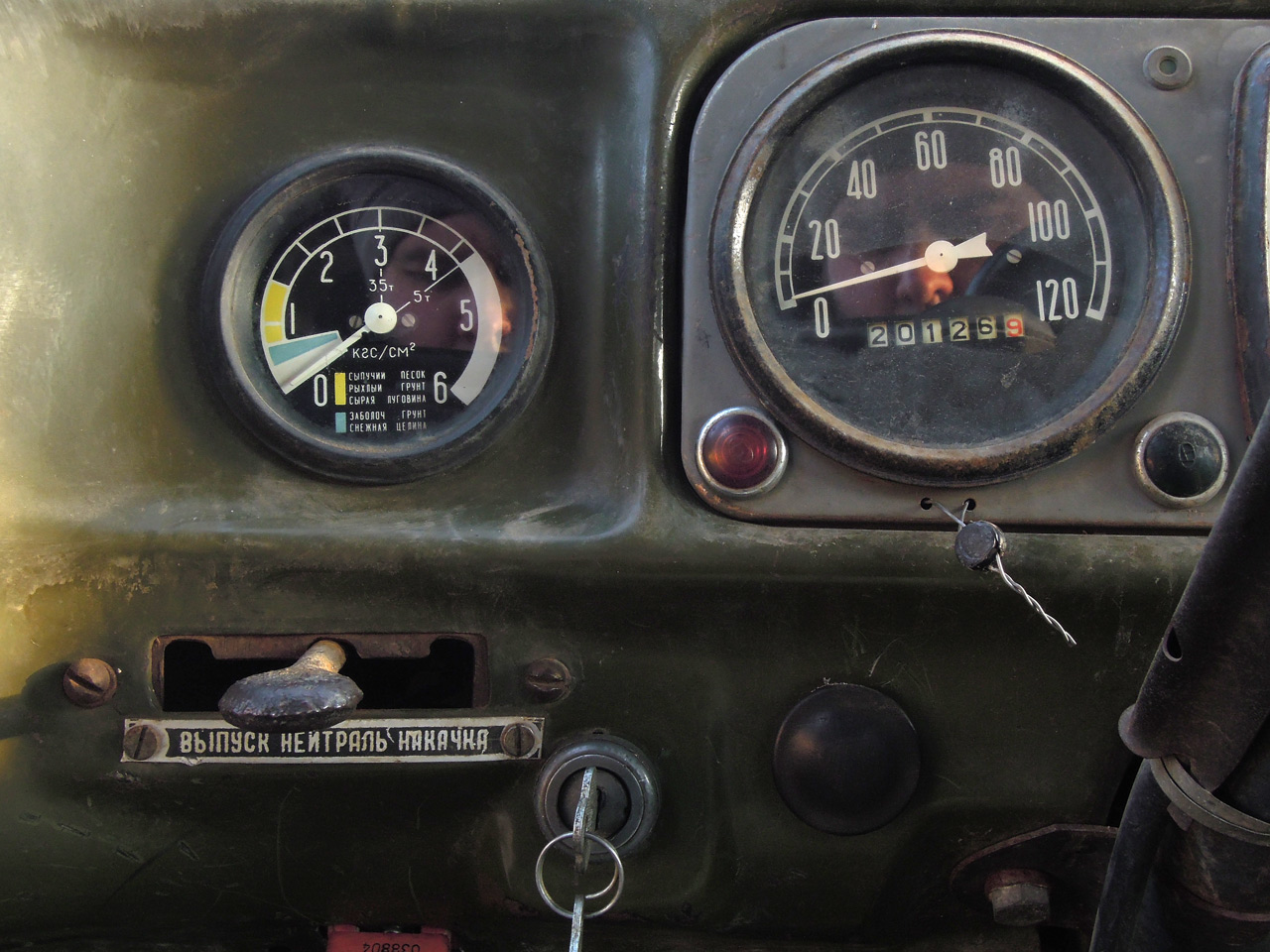
Manometer and valve of tires pressure

== See also ==
- Ural-4320

== Sources ==
- инженер-конструктор В. Митрофанов. ЗИЛ-131. Новый автомобиль высокой проходимости // журнал "За рулём", № 8, 1967. стр.8-9
- Coffey, Patrick (2013). American Arsenal: A Century of Waging War. Oxford University Press. ISBN 978-0-19-995975-4.
- Foss, Christopher F.; Gander, Terry J., eds. (1999). Jane's Military Vehicles and Logistics, 1999-2000. Jane's Information Group. ISBN 978-0-7106-1912-9.
