= Lift =

Lift or LIFT may refer to:

== Physical devices ==
- Elevator, or lift, a device used for raising and lowering people or goods
  - Paternoster lift, a type of lift using a continuous chain of cars which do not stop
  - Patient lift, or Hoyer lift, mobile lift, ceiling lift, a lift to assist a caregiver for a disabled patient
  - Rack lift, a type of elevator
  - Ski lift, an aerial or surface lift for uphill transport
  - Space elevator, a hypothetical structure for transporting material from a planet's surface into outer space
  - Wheelchair lift or platform lift, a powered device to assist a person in a wheelchair
- Forklift, a powered industrial truck used to lift and move materials short distances
- Scissor lift, a type of aerial work platform
- Body lift, an adaptation (of fixed height) to lift the automobile body from the frame
- Suspension lift, a modification raising the suspension of the automobile
- Stairlift, a mechanical device to help people with disabilities get up stairs
- Heel lift, a shoe insert to increase the height of the wearer

== Sport ==
- A specific way of lifting a barbell, dumbbell(s), kettlebell, or other piece of sporting equipment in a strength sport (e.g. weightlifting, weight training, powerlifting), such as
  - clean-and-jerk, snatch, deadlift, squat, bench press, military press, clean-and-press, dumbbell curl, fly, calf raise, two hands anyhow
- Figure skating lifts, movements in pair skating and ice dancing

== Science and technology ==
- Lift (force), in fluid dynamics, a force generated by an object moving through a fluid
  - Lift coefficient, a coefficient that relates the lift generated by a lifting body to other parameters
- Lift (soaring), rising air used by soaring birds and glider, hang glider and paraglider pilots for soaring flight
- Lift (data mining), a measure of the performance of a model at segmenting the population
- Lift (web framework), a web application framework for Scala
- Light-Induced Fluorescence Transient, a device to remotely measure chlorophyll fluorescence in plants

== Mathematics ==
- Lift (mathematics), an kind of morphism in category theory
- Homotopy lifting property, a unique path over a map
- Covering graph or lift

== Cosmetics ==
- Shoe lifts, a removable shoe insert
  - Elevator shoes, shoes that have thickened sections of the insoles
- Plastic surgery, surgery to lift the skin
  - Rhytidectomy or face lift, a type of plastic surgery
  - Mastopexy or breast lift, a type of plastic surgery

== Media ==
- London International Festival of Theatre (LIFT)

=== Films ===
- The Lift, a 1983 Dutch horror film by Dick Maas
- Lift (2021 film), an Indian Tamil-language horror drama film
- Lift (2022 film), an American documentary film
- Lift (2024 film), an American heist comedy film

=== Music ===
- Lift (band), a German rock band

==== Albums ====
- Lift (Audio Adrenaline album) or the title song, 2001
- Lift (Dave Gunning album), 2015
- Lift (Love and Rockets album) or the title song, 1998
- L.I.F.T., by Neal Morse, 2026
- Lift (Shannon Noll album) or the title song (see below), 2005
- Lift (Sister Hazel album), 2004
- Lift: Live at the Village Vanguard, by Chris Potter, or the title song, 2004
- Lift, by Onehundredhours, 2001

==== Songs ====
- "Lift" (Poets of the Fall song), 2004
- "Lift" (Radiohead song), 2017
- "Lift" (Sean Tyas song), 2006
- "Lift" (Shannon Noll song), 2005
- "Lift", by 808 State from ex:el, 1991
- "Lift", by Immanuel Wilkins from The 7th Hand (2022)

== Other uses ==
- LIFT (nonprofit), a nonprofit anti-poverty organization
- LIFT (airline), South African Domestic Airline
- Lead-in fighter trainer, a type of advanced military training aircraft
- Legal Information for Families Today (LIFT), nonprofit that provides legal information in New York State, US
- Lift (soft drink), a brand of carbonated beverage produced and marketed by the Coca-Cola Company
- Airlift, in logistics, the act of transporting people or cargo from point to point using aircraft
- Hitchhiking, a form of transport in which the traveller tries to get a lift (or ride) from another traveller
- Lift, a special type of arrow in the video game engine StepMania

== See also ==
- Lifting (disambiguation)
- List of weight training exercises
- Belt manlift, a belt with rungs and steps for moving people vertically
- Lyft, a ridesharing company
