= Lifting =

Lifting may refer to:

- Manual handling of loads
- Raising objects upwards, for example with lifting equipment
- Weightlifting, lifting weights for exercise and sport, including:
  - Olympic weightlifting, an Olympic sport that tests explosive strength
  - Powerlifting, a sport that tests limit strength
  - Weight training, a way of increasing strength
- An undesirable type of movement in the sport of racewalking
- Shoplifting, an unnoticed theft of goods from an open retail establishment
- Facelifting, a type of cosmetic surgery
- Lift, a morphism in mathematics
- Lifting theory, a notion in measure theory
- Lifting scheme (wavelets)
- Lambda lifting, meta-process that defines functions independently of each other in a global scope
- Taking an inference rule in propositional logic and adapting it for predicate logic
- Type lifting, adding the special null value to the scope of a type

== See also ==
- Facelift (disambiguation)
- Lift (disambiguation)
