= Big lift =

Big lift or variation, may refer to:

- The Big Lift, a 1950 black-and-white film
- 2015 "Big Lift" project, a project to renovate the Angus L. Macdonald Bridge
- 1963 Operation "Big Lift", a U.S. Armed Forces deployment operation to practise war deployment
- BigLift Shipping, a Dutch shipping company, operator of heavy-lift ships

== See also ==
- Bell Model 214B Big Lifter helicopter
- Lift (disambiguation)
- Big (disambiguation)
