= Mack MD =

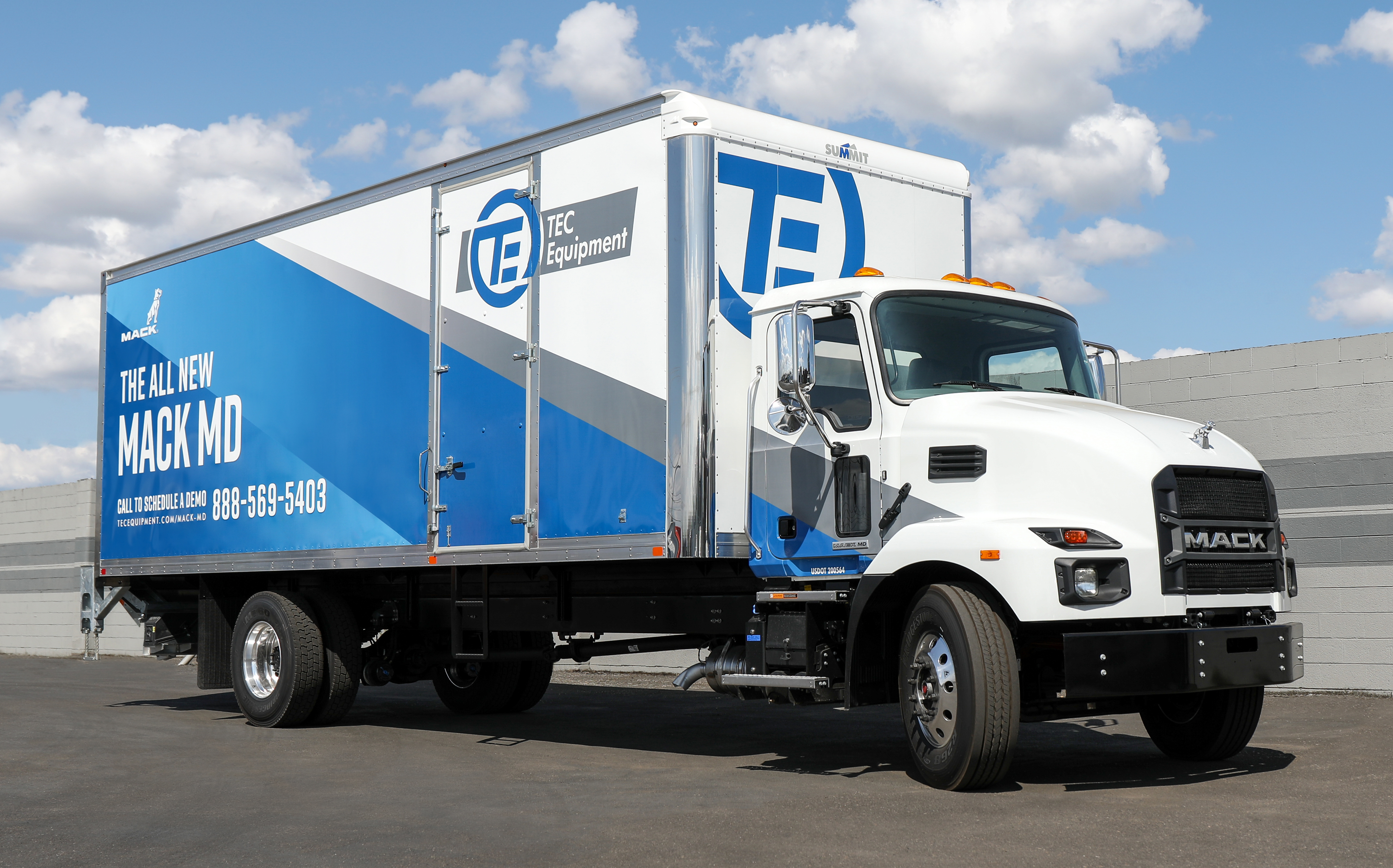
- Mack MD

Overview
- Manufacturer: Mack Trucks
- Model code: MD4BA
- Production: 2020-present
- Model years: 2020-2026
- Assembly: United States: Salem, Virginia

Body and chassis
- Class: 6 and 7
- Body style: Conventional day-cab
- Layout: 4x2

Powertrain
- Engine: Cummins B6.7; AC elec. with lithium-ion batteries
- Transmission: Allison 2500 RDS; Allison 3000 RDS

Dimensions
- Wheelbase: 151-274 in (3,835.4-6,959.6 mm)
- Width: 96 in (2,400 mm)
- Curb weight: 33,000 lb (15,000 kg); Gross Vehicle Weight (GVW)

The Mack MD is a series of medium-duty (Class 6 and 7) trucks built by Mack Trucks. It has a short, low-profile hood and a high-visibility cab. It is designed as straight trucks for local delivery, construction, and other vocational jobs. The MD was introduced in February 2020 entered full production in July 2020.

== Design ==
The MD is a short-hood conventional class 6-7 truck. Designed for local use it has a day-cab only. It has two axles with the rear one driven. Total loaded weight can be up to 25,995 pounds (11,791 kg) for the MD6 and 33,000 pounds (15,000 kg) for the MD7.

Mack doesn't build any medium-duty components and uses a vendor engine, transmission, and axles.

== Engine and transmission ==
A Cummins B.67L diesel engine is used. It is a 6.7L turbocharged inline six-cylinder engine. It develops 220 to 300 horsepower (160 to 220 kW) and 560 to 660 pound force-feet (760 to 890 N⋅m) of torque.

An Allison 2500 RDS and 3000 RDS 6-speed transmission is used. They are fully automatic planetary gear transmission with a lock-up torque converter.

== Chassis ==
A ladder frame with beam axles is used. Meritor supplies both the front and driven rear axles. It’s wheelbase is 151-274 in (varies by configuration).

== Applications ==
Mack is marketing the MD for local box van, stake/flatbed, dump, and tanker use.

== BEV ==
240 kWh NMC battery, 19.2 kW AC or 80 kW DC charging. 260hp, 1850lb-ft. 19400lb payload. Dual-airbag cab suspension and air ride seat. Led headlights, steel front bumper, galvanized steel cab, 120k psi steel frame, 5 wheelbase options.
