= Overhang (vehicles) =

Length of a road vehicle beyond the wheelbase

A: front overhang, B: rear overhang

Overhangs are the lengths of a road vehicle which extend beyond the wheelbase at the front and rear. They are normally described as front overhang and rear overhang. Practicality, style, and performance are affected by the size and weight of overhangs.

== Background ==
Along with clearance, the length of overhangs determines the approach and departure angles, which determines the vehicle's ability to overcome steep obstacles and rough terrain. The longer the front overhang, the smaller is the approach angle, and thus the car's ability to climb or descend steep ramps without damaging the front bumpers is smaller. Typically, the rear overhang is larger on rear-wheel drive cars, while the front overhang is larger on front-wheel drive cars.

The overhangs are from the bogie pivots to the ends of the railroad car profile

For rolling stock, each overhang is the length from the bogie pivots to the end of the car, or in the case of two axles the distance outside of the wheelbase to the end of the car.

Journalist Paul Niedermeyer has proposed an overhang ratio (OHR) to capture as a single parameter the combined size of the front and rear overhangs, normalized to vehicle length, computed as $OHR = \frac{\left ( length - wheelbase \right )}{length}$. Because most vehicles are constructed so that the wheelbase is typically equal to four wheel+tyre diameters, the minimum OHR (with no bodywork projecting beyond the front or rear wheels) is approximately 20%.

== List of examples ==
Selected overhang ratio examples
| Vehicle | Image | Wheelbase | Length | OHR (%) |
|---|---|---|---|---|
| Alpine A110 | | 2,099 mm (82.6 in) | 3,850 mm (151.6 in) | 45.5 |
| BMW 507 | | 2,480 mm (97.6 in) | 4,380 mm (172.4 in) | 43.4 |
| Cadillac Eldorado (1959) | | 3,302 mm (130.0 in) | 5,715 mm (225.0 in) | 42.2 |
| Donkervoort D8 | | 2,350 mm (92.5 in) | 3,740 mm (147.2 in) | 37.2 |
| Eagle Vision | | 2,870 mm (113.0 in) | 5,121 mm (201.6 in) | 44.0 |
| Ferrari 612 Scaglietti | | 2,950 mm (116.1 in) | 4,902 mm (193.0 in) | 39.8 |
| GM New Look bus (40') | | 7,240 mm (285.0 in) | 12,190 mm (479.9 in) | 40.6 |
| Hummer H1 | | 3,302 mm (130.0 in) | 4,686 mm (184.5 in) | 29.5 |
| Isuzu VehiCROSS | | 2,332 mm (91.8 in) | 4,130 mm (162.6 in) | 43.5 |
| Jeep CJ-7 | | 2,370 mm (93.3 in) | 3,759 mm (148.0 in) | 37.0 |
| Kaiser Dragon | | 3,010 mm (118.5 in) | 5,364 mm (211.2 in) | 43.9 |
| Lotus Esprit (S3) | | 2,440 mm (96.1 in) | 4,320 mm (170.1 in) | 43.5 |
| Mini (saloon) | | 2,036 mm (80.2 in) | 3,054 mm (120.2 in) | 33.3 |
| Nissan Vanette (C22) | | 2,075 mm (81.7 in) | 3,980 mm (156.7 in) | 47.9 |
| Oldsmobile Ninety-Eight (8th gen.) | | 3,226 mm (127.0 in) | 5,700 mm (224.4 in) | 43.4 |
| Plymouth Superbird | | 2,941 mm (115.8 in) | 5,613 mm (221.0 in) | 47.6 |
| Porsche 993 | | 2,272 mm (89.4 in) | 4,260 mm (167.7 in) | 46.7 |
| Qvale Mangusta | | 2,658 mm (104.6 in) | 4,194 mm (165.1 in) | 36.6 |
| Renault 5 | | 2,419 mm (95.2 in) | 3,521 mm (138.6 in) | 31.3 |
| Saab 99 | | 2,473 mm (97.4 in) | 4,340 mm (170.9 in) | 43.0 |
| Tesla Model S | | 2,960 mm (116.5 in) | 4,980 mm (196.1 in) | 40.6 |
| UAZ-469 | | 2,380 mm (93.7 in) | 4,025 mm (158.5 in) | 40.9 |
| Volkswagen Beetle | | 2,400 mm (94.5 in) | 4,079 mm (160.6 in) | 41.2 |
| XPeng P7 | | 2,998 mm (118.0 in) | 4,880 mm (192.1 in) | 38.6 |
| ZIL-41047 | | 3,880 mm (152.8 in) | 6,339 mm (249.6 in) | 38.8 |

== Advantages ==
Large overhangs contribute to large vehicle dimensions, and the associated advantages of size. On front-engined saloon/sedans, measuring rear overhang is helpful in predicting the size of the trunk. For these same vehicles, large front overhangs can accommodate larger engines. Large overhangs also contribute to safety due to increased bulk, as well as space for crumple zones that provide defense for passengers in frontal and rear collisions.

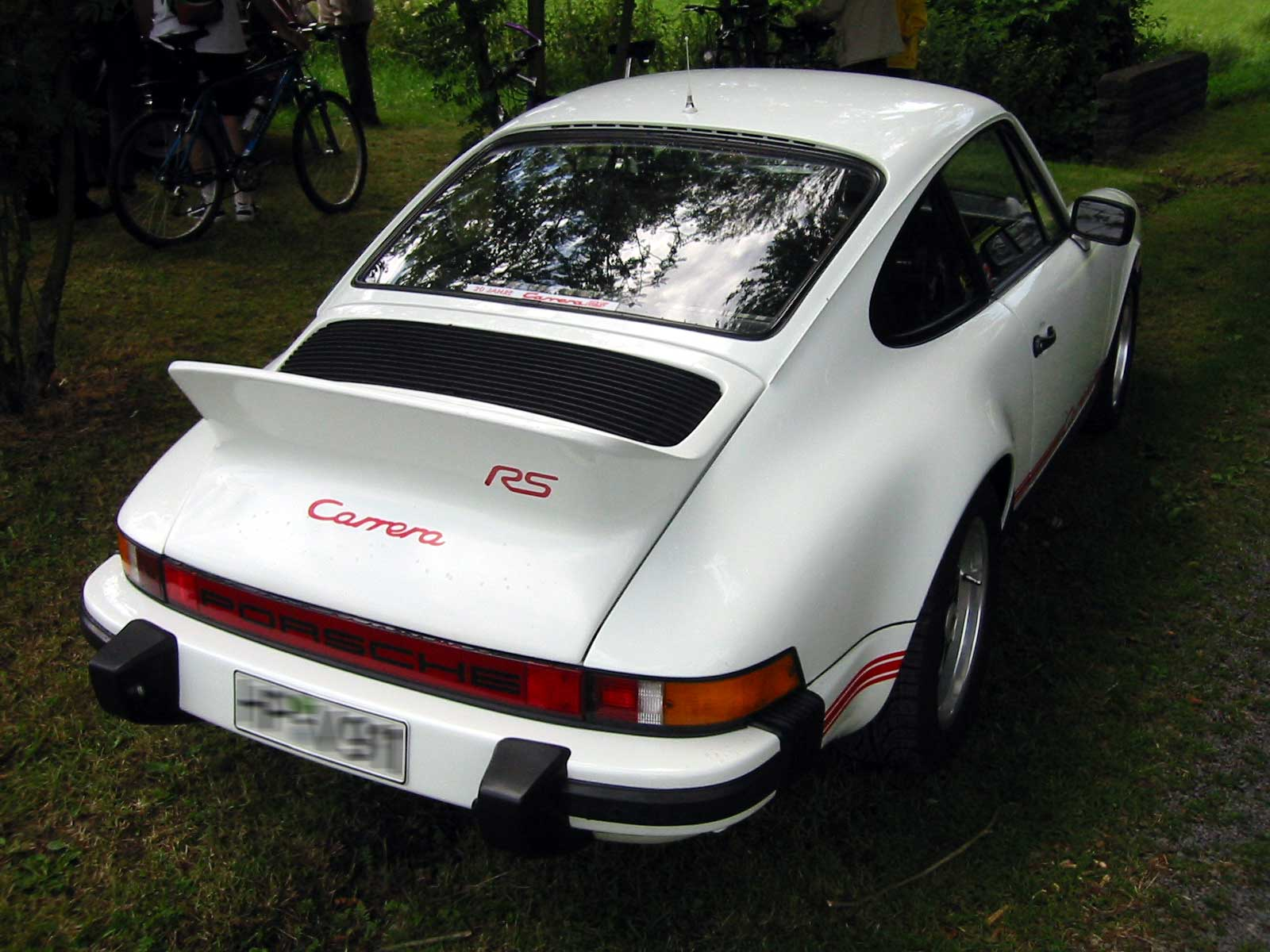
Rear-engined 911: engine's center of mass is concentrated within the rear overhang, outside the wheelbase.

The Porsche 911, produced since 1964, has always contained its entire flat-6 engine within its rear overhang, with the center of mass of the engine outside of the wheelbase. In the case of the 911, the rear-mounted engine allows for increased practicality in the form of a small rear row of seats that would be impossible with a mid-engined sports car.

== Disadvantages ==
Overhangs affect approach and departure angles of a car.

Excessive weight that is concentrated outside of the wheelbase can interfere with accurate negotiation of corners at high speed. The rear-engined Porsche 911, with its engine far in the rear, was notorious for dangerous oversteer in its early days, and cars with engines far in the front often suffered from the opposite problem of understeer, for which many old American cars with heavy V8 engines were infamous. Front-engined Ferraris, such as the Ferrari 612 Scaglietti place their engines within the wheelbase, so as to avoid the problem of understeer. Reducing overhanging weight in sports cars is usually a priority, with the notable exception of the 911.

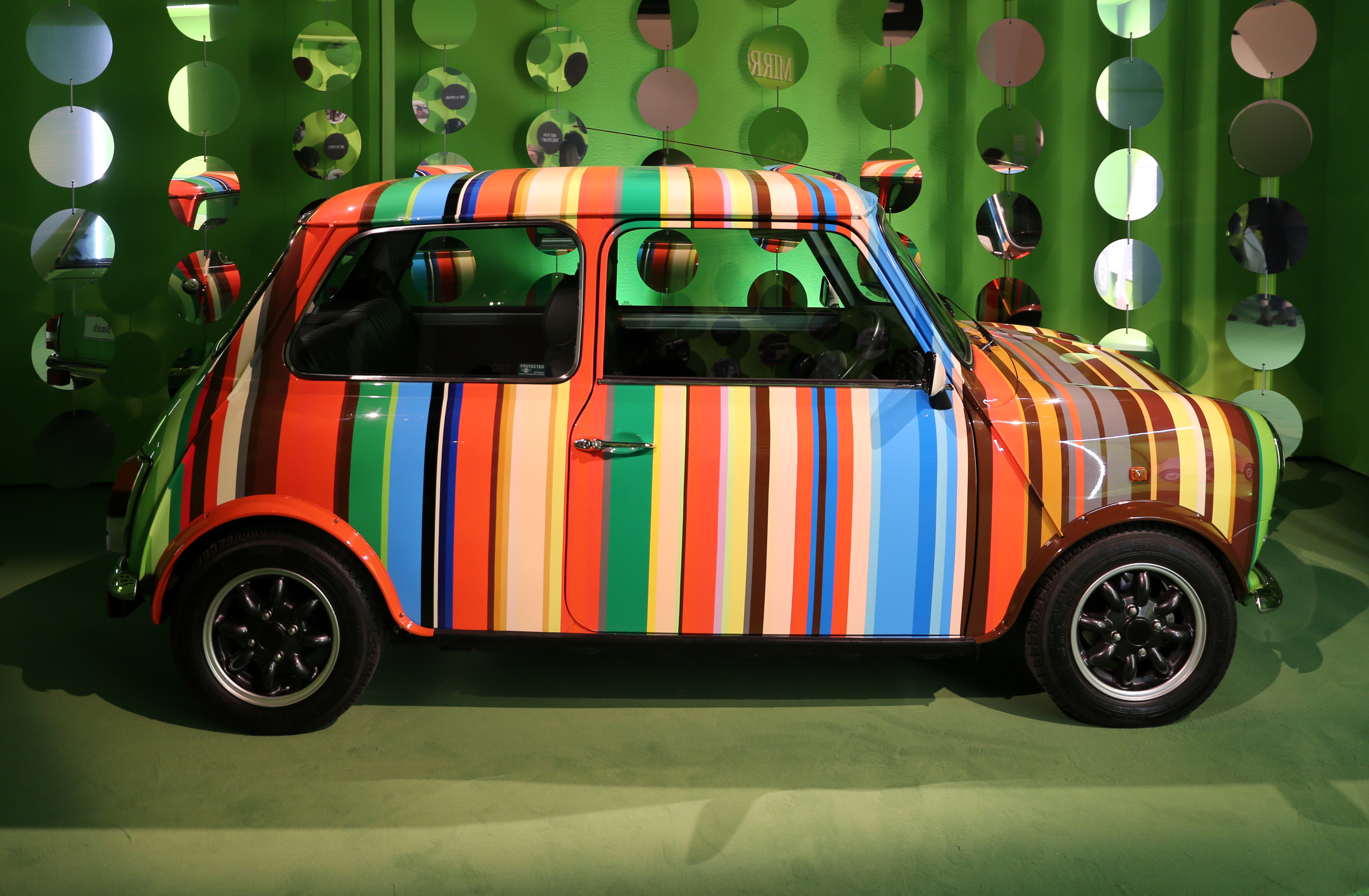
Mini Cooper (styled by Paul Smith)

In contrast, the excellent handling of the Mini, with its wheels pushed far out at each corner, can be partly credited to its small overhang. The classic Mini and New MINI both have very little overhang and thus handle very well under extreme conditions. The minimal overhang gives the Mini its bulldog-like stance.

Rear overhang may present a problem in large vehicles such as buses. Long rear overhang would require the driver to pay attention to nearby vehicles when turning at 90 degrees. Since the rear overhang is outside the wheelbase, it may hit a vehicle in the adjacent lane, especially when turning 90 degrees right (in a right-hand drive country).

Also, some specialized vehicles (such as the AM General HMMWV and the related Hummer H1) are designed with no frontal overhang, allowing it to possess incredible abilities such as climbing vertical walls. This does, however, place these vehicles' front wheels as the furthest forward point of the vehicle, which can lead to disastrous results in the event of a frontal collision.

== See also ==
- Approach and departure angles
- Cantilever
- Idler flatcar
- Minimum railway curve radius
- Ride height
- Turning radius
- Wheelbase
