= Body lift =

Vehicle modification to raise ride height

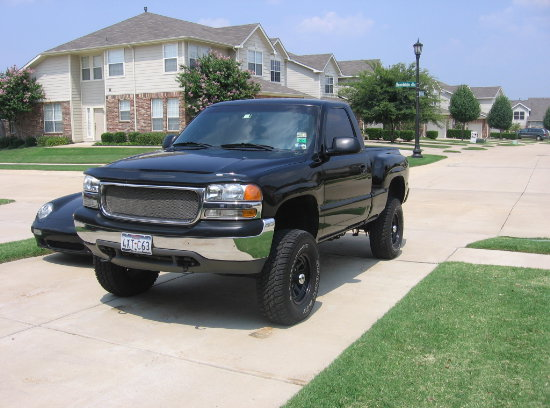
Truck with a body lift

A body lift is a modification where spacers are installed between a vehicle's body and chassis in order to increase the ride height (only increases running clearance on vehicles with solid axle(s)). It is a common method to run larger tires on a vehicle. It is also often used to allow the placement of a larger motor for an engine swap. Body lifts can be built at home from components, or they can be purchased as kits from manufacturers. Properly installed kits are not easily noticed, while home built kits often look incomplete. Complete kits include brackets to realign the bumpers to match the body, and gap guards are purchased to cover the frame. Depending on the model of vehicle, they may also include steering shaft extensions and extensions for fuel filler necks.

A suspension lift is a type of body lift.

== See also ==
- Scissor lift
