= Turning radius =

Minimum dimension for a vehicle to make a turn

Diagram showing the path of a driver performing a U-turn. A vehicle with a smaller turning diameter will be able to perform a sharper U-turn.

The turning radius (alternatively, turning diameter or turning circle) of a vehicle defines the minimum dimension (typically the radius or diameter) of available space required for that vehicle to make a semi-circular U-turn without skidding. The Oxford English Dictionary describes turning circle as "the smallest circle within which a ship, motor vehicle, etc., can be turned round completely". The term thus refers to a theoretical minimal circle in which for example an aeroplane, a ground vehicle or a watercraft can be turned around.

The terms (radius, diameter, or circle) can have different meanings; refer to the § Alternative nomenclature section.

== Definition ==
Diagram of turning vehicle.

On wheeled vehicles with the common type of front wheel steering (i.e. one, two or even four wheels at the front capable of steering), the vehicle's turning diameter measures the minimum space needed to turn the vehicle around while the steering is set to its maximum displacement from the central 'straight ahead' position - i.e. either extreme left or right. If a marker pen were placed on the point of the vehicle furthest from the center of the turn, the diameter of the circle traced would be the vehicle's turning diameter. The turning radius is half of the turning diameter.

The curb-to-curb turning radius, which considers the chassis and wheels only without body protrusions, can be expressed as a simplified function of the wheelbase, tire width, and steering angle:

$$turning\ radius = \frac{wheelbase}{\sin{\left ( steering\ angle \right )}} + \frac{tire\ width}{2}$$

Aircraft have a similar minimum turning circle concept, generally associated with a standard rate turn, in which an aircraft enters a coordinated turn which changes its heading at a rate of 3° per second, or 180° in one minute. In this case, the turning radius depends on the true airspeed $v_t$ (in knots) as:

$$turning\ radius = \frac{v_t}{20 \pi * 3 / \mathrm{s}}$$

Turning diameter is sometimes used in everyday language as a generalized term rather than with numerical figures. For example, a wheeled vehicle with a very small turning circle may be described as having a "tight turning radius", meaning that it is easier to turn around very tight corners. Wheeled vehicles with four-wheel steering will have a smaller turning radius than vehicles that steer wheels on one axle.

=== Exceptions ===
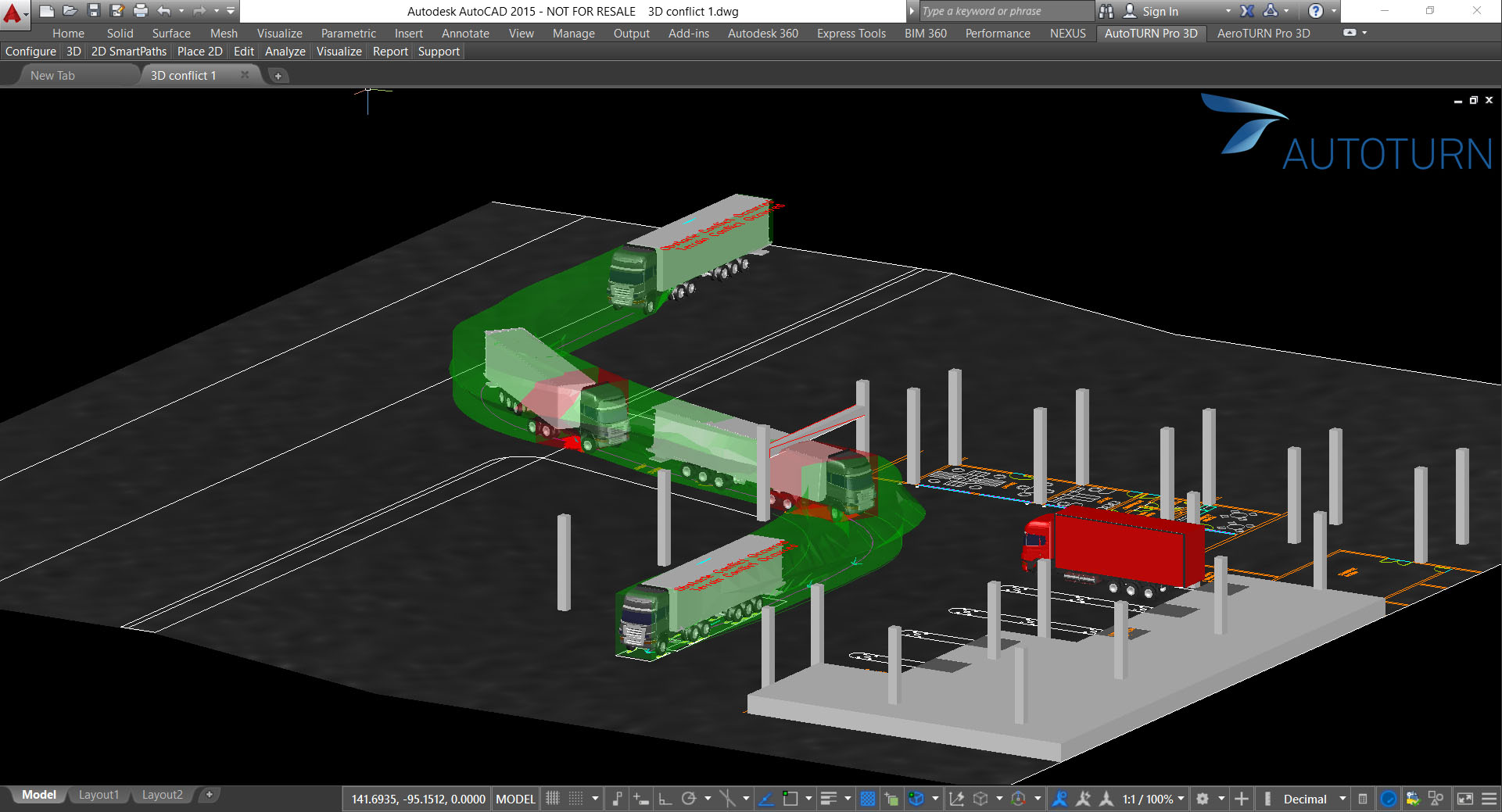
Turning radius of a vehicle depends on the vehicle type

Technically, the minimum possible turning circle for a vehicle would be where it does not move either forwards or backwards while turning and simply pivots on its central axis. For a rectangular vehicle capable of doing this, the smallest turning circle would be equal to the diagonal length of the vehicle. As an example, some boats can be turned in this way, generally by using azimuth thrusters.

Some wheeled vehicles are designed to spin around their central axis by making all wheels steerable, such as certain lawnmowers and wheelchairs as they do not follow a circular path as they turn. In this case the vehicle is referred to as a "zero turning radius" vehicle. Some camera dollies used in the film industry have a "round" mode which allows them to spin around their z axis by allowing synchronized inverse rotation of their left and right wheel sets, effectively giving them "zero" turning radius.

Many conventionally steerable vehicles (only one axle with steerable wheels) can reverse the direction of travel in a space smaller than the stated turning radius by executing a specialized maneuver, such as a J-turn or similar skid, or in a discontinuous motion such as a three-point turn.

== Alternative nomenclature ==
Turning radius $r$ and turning diameter $d$ of a passenger car: The wall-to-wall turning circle is shown at the top and takes the vehicle front overhang into consideration, while the curb-to-curb turning circle is shown at the bottom.

Other terms are sometimes used synonymously for turning diameter, which can lead to confusion.

=== Turning radius and diameter ===
The automotive term turning radius has been used as equivalent and interchangeable with the turning diameter. For example, the 2017 Audi A4 is specified by the manufacturer as having a turning diameter (curb-to-curb) of 11.6 m (38 ft). Mathematically, the radius of a circle is half the diameter, so the correct turning radius in this example would be (11.6 m)/2 = 5.8 m. However, another source lists the turning radius of the same vehicle as also being 11.6 m, which is the turning diameter.

In practice, the values of turning diameter tend to be listed more frequently in vehicle specifications, so the term turning diameter will therefore be more correct in most cases. The turning diameter will always give a higher number for a given vehicle, and the turning diameter measurement is usually preferred by automotive manufacturers. Such mixing of terms can lead to confusion among consumers.

=== Turning circle ===
The term turning circle is another term also sometimes used synonymously for the turning diameter. Some argue that turning circle is less ambiguous than turning radius, but "turning circle" may introduce its own ambiguities since the same circle can be defined by multiple measurements, including the radius $r$, diameter ($d = 2 \cdot r$, twice as big), or circumference ($2 \pi r$, about 6.28 times as big). For example, Motor Trend refers to a "curb-to-curb turning circle" of a 2008 Cadillac CTS as 10.82 metres (35.5 ft), but the terminology is not yet settled. AutoChannel.com refers to the "turning radius" of the same car as 10.82 metres (35.5 ft).

Turning circle is also sometimes used to refer to the path swept in the manoeuvre, i.e. the arc, or the circle's circumference in the case when the manoeuvre makes a complete turn.

== Different measurement methods ==
There are two methods for measuring the vehicle turning diameter which will give slightly different results. These two methods are called wall-to-wall and curb-to-curb (US spelling), or alternatively kerb-to-kerb (UK spelling).

The wall-to-wall turning circle is the minimum distance between two walls, both of which exceed the height of the vehicle, in which the vehicle can make a U-turn. The kerb-to-kerb turning circle is the minimum distance between two raised curbs, both of which are lower than the lowest body protrusions, in which the vehicle can make a U-turn. The wall-to-wall turning circle is greater than the kerb-to-kerb measure for the same vehicle because of the front and rear body overhangs. One can find these two ways of measuring the turning circle used in auto specifications, for example, a van might be listed as having a turning circle (in meters) of 12.1 (C) / 12.4 (W).

=== Curb-to-curb ===
A curb or curb-to-curb turning circle will show the straight-line distance from one side of the circle to the other, through the center. The name "curb-to-curb" indicates that a street would have to be this wide before this car can make a U-turn and not hit a street curb with a wheel. If you took the street curb and built it higher, as high as the car, and tried to make a U-turn in the street, parts of the car (bumper) would hit the wall.

The kerb-to-kerb turning circle can be smaller than the turning circle as it refers to only a partial circle (~180°) with the vehicle alongside one kerb to start with. To perform a U turn in a forward direction only, the centre of the turn is not coincident with the centre of the road - thus a complete circle would not be possible (without driving onto the pavement to complete the manoeuvre). It also does not take into account that part of the vehicle that overhangs the wheels where as 'turning circle' does.

=== Wall-to-wall ===
The name wall or wall-to-wall turning circle denotes how far apart the two walls would have to be to allow a U-turn without scraping the walls.

== Legal requirements for road vehicles ==
European Union and Switzerland

Road vehicles must be able to carry out a 360 degrees turn on an annulus with an outer radius of 12.5 metres (41 ft) and an inner radius of 5.3 metres (17 ft), measured wall-to-wall. In addition, when entering this annulus, no part of the vehicle can overreach a tangent by more than 80 centimetres (31 in); this tangent is drawn at the outer, 12.5 m limit of the annulus.

New Zealand

New Zealand requires that road vehicles can perform a 360 degrees turn on a circle with a 25 metres (82 ft) diameter, measured wall-to-wall. The only part of the vehicle that may reach over this limitation are collapsible mirrors.

== Common uses ==
- Aeroplanes
- Watercraft
- Wheeled vehicles

== See also ==
- Breakover angle
- Dubins path
- Minimum railway curve radius
- Overhang (automotive)
- Ride height
- U-turn (maneuver)
