= Light-induced fluorescence transient =

Instrument for scientific study of photosynthesis in plants

A light-induced fluorescence transient (LIFT) is a device to remotely measure chlorophyll fluorescence in plants in a fast and non-destructive way. By using a series of excitation light pulses, LIFT combines chlorophyll fluorescence data with spectral and RGB information to provide insights into various photosynthetic traits and vegetation indices. LIFT combines the pump-probe method with the principle of laser-induced fluorescence.

== Fluorescence measurement principle ==
A LIFT measures photosynthesis by exposing the plant to short flashes of blue light and analyzing the changes in fluorescence over time by the help of the FRR technique.

=== LIFT FRR technique ===
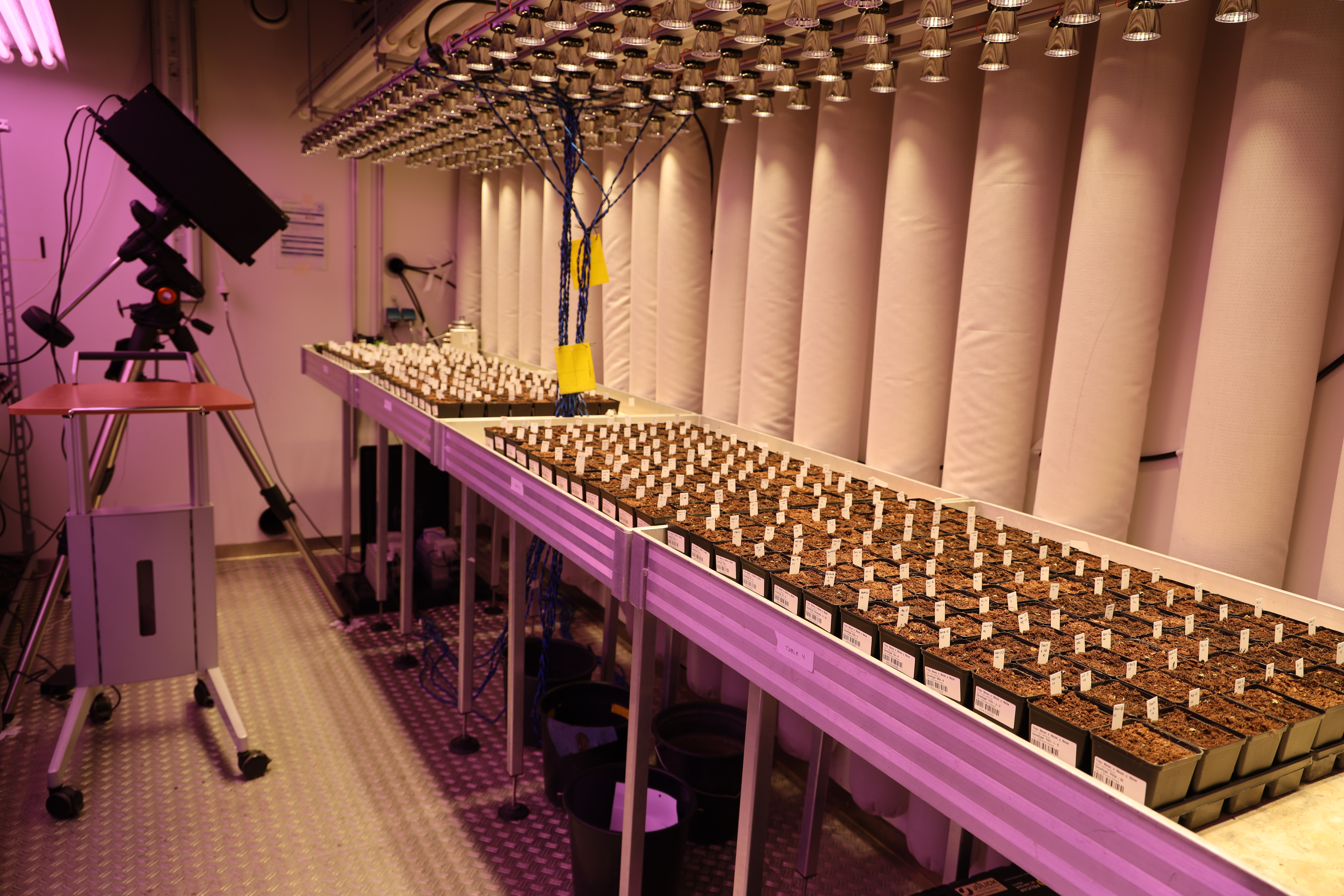
Light-induced fluorescence transient instrument (black box) in a growth chamber measuring Arabidopsis thaliana plants.

The LIFT fast repetition rate (FRR) fluorescence technique is a method for measuring plant fluorescence. It uses a series of short bursts of blue light pulses from a LED to excite photosystem II in the plant. When the quinone acceptor A (Q_{A}) reaches its capacity for binding electrons, the system becomes saturated and consequently red fluorescence is emitted. This is regulated by a precise excitation protocol, which consists of a saturation sequence (SQA) and a relaxation sequence (RQA) with a set of short excitation flashes (1 μs).

The fluorescence can then be measured with FRR fluorometry. For that purpose, the LIFT instrument has a built-in optical interference filter to separate the red chlorophyll fluorescence from reflected light, with a wavelength of 685 ± 10 nm.

The fluorescence transient resulting from this excitation protocol shows the kinetics of the reduction of Q_{A} and its subsequent re-oxidation, and can be used to calculate various photosynthetic indicators. These indicators provide information on the level of photosynthetic activity, such as the efficiency of light utilization, the quantum yield of photochemical conversion, and the rate of electron transport.

=== LIFT-retrieved photosynthetic indicators ===
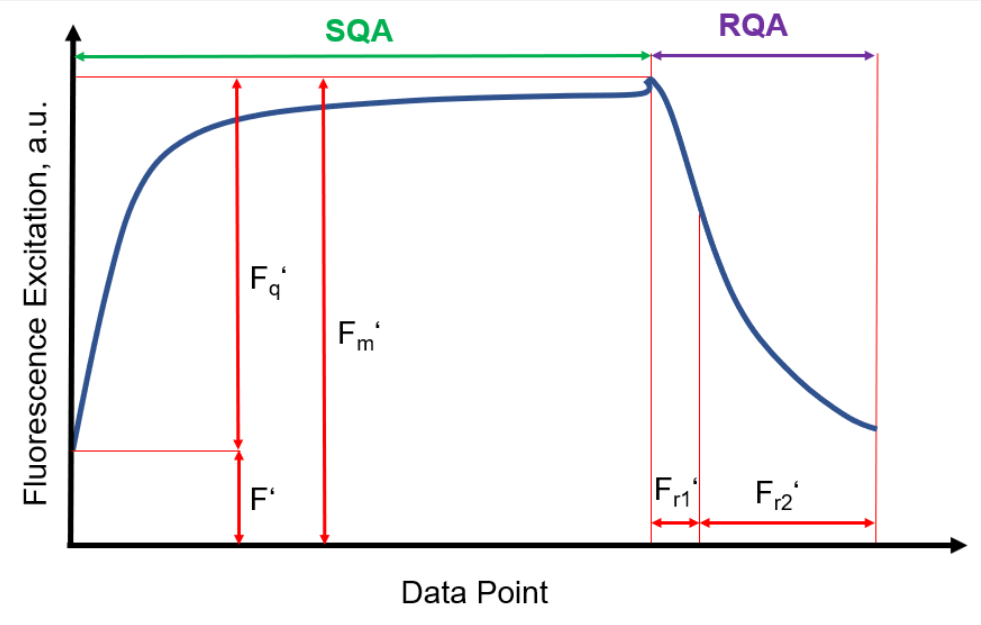
LIFT Transient with the saturation (SQA) and relaxation sequence (RQA) showing the initial (F'), maximum (Fm') and variable fluorescence (Fq').

The LIFT system measures chlorophyll fluorescence by stimulating the plant with excitation light, leading to an increase in fluorescence to its maximum (Fm'). The naturally occurring fluorescence (F') can also be measured without the excitation light. The variable fluorescence (Fq') can be calculated as the difference between Fm' and F'. The Photosystem II operating efficiency can be calculated using the equation:

$\ce{Fq'/Fm' = (Fm' - F')/ Fm'}$

For the relaxation sequence (RQA), different relaxation parameters can be calculated according to different time sections:

- F_{r1}, ~ 0.625 ms after the maximum Fluorescence has occurred and
- F_{r2}, ~ 6.5 ms after the maximum Fluorescence has occurred.

These parameters can be used for calculating the reoxidation efficiency of Q_{A} i.e. the kinetics of electron transfer between QA to PQ pool to photosystem I for light-adapted plants.

== Development history and models ==
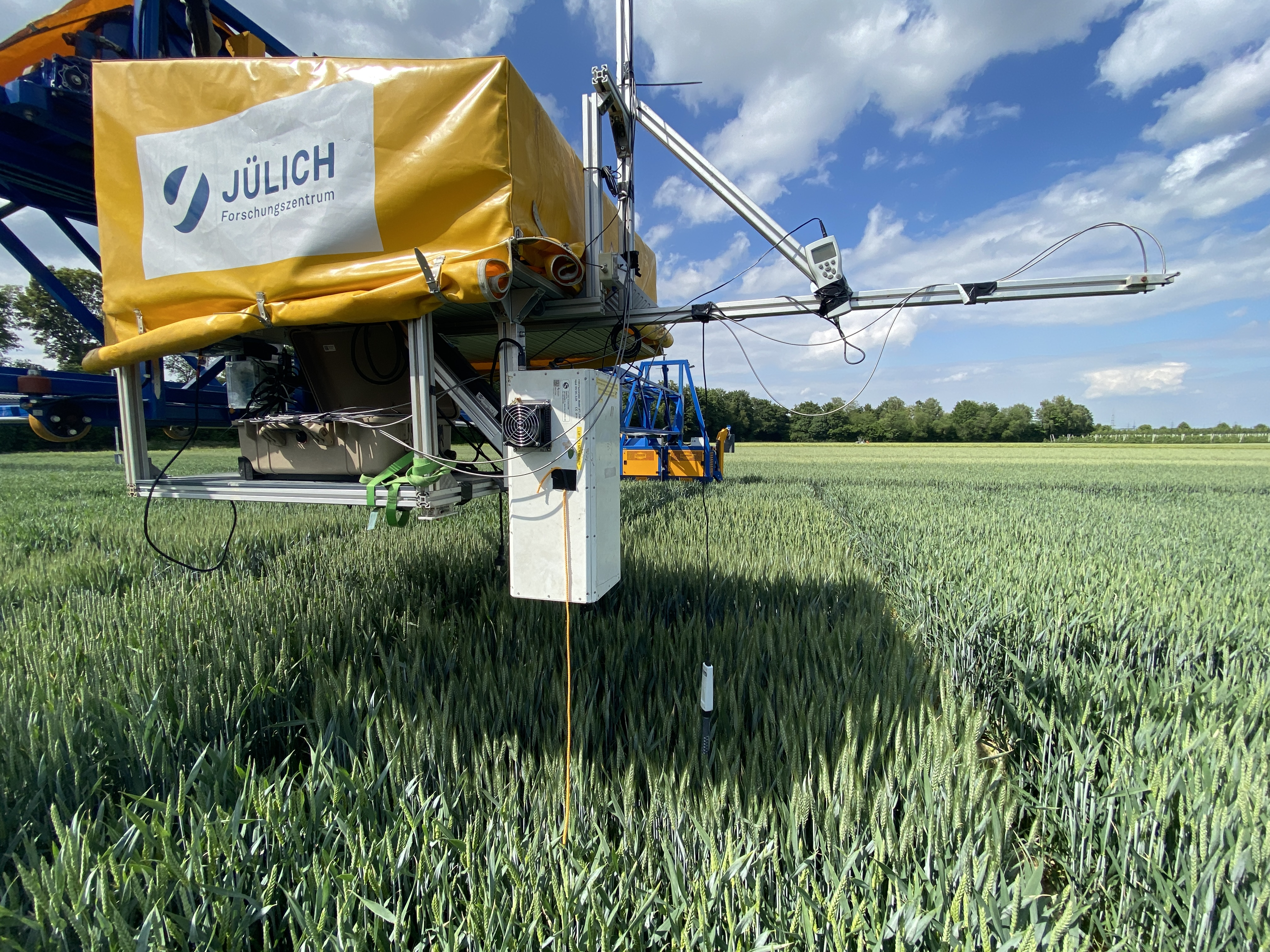
Light-induced fluorescence transient instrument (white box) on a semi-automated phenotyping platform measuring Winter wheat plants grown under elevated CO_{2}.

The concept for an airborne LIFT instrument was developed by Zbigniew Kolber at Rutgers University in 1998. The first field test was conducted at Biosphere 2 in Arizona in 2002 using a stationary large LIFT setup equipped with a laser operating at a distance of up to 50 meters. The prototype instrument was later refined and improved at the Carnegie Institute, Stanford, and the Agricultural Research Center in Arizona, where the first attempt to operate it on a tractor frame was made. In 2010 several instruments were transferred from Carnegie to the Forschungszentrum Jülich where they are used for laboratory and field research in robotic positioning systems for non-invasive, high-throughput data acquisition.

== Current research ==
In recent research, LIFT has been used in laboratory settings to explore the kinetics of photosynthesis and was also implemented in high-throughput phenotyping platforms for early drought detection. In a more recent publication, the device has been used to study the effects of future elevated atmospheric CO_{2} concentrations on the seasonal photosynthesis dynamics of different wheat cultivars. The authors showed that the elevated CO_{2} concentration increased the photosynthetic efficiency, mainly during vegetative growth.
