= Facelift (disambiguation) =

Facelift is the common name for rhytidectomy, a cosmetic surgery procedure.

Facelift or Face Lift may also refer to:

- Facelift (product), the revival of a product through cosmetic means such as changing its appearance
- Facelift (automotive), minor revisions to a car model in the middle of its production run
- Facelift (album), a 1990 album by Alice in Chains
- Facelift (TV series), a New Zealand comedy show
- "Face Lift" (CSI), an episode of the television show CSI: Crime Scene Investigation
- "Facelift", a song by Soft Machine from the album Third
- "Face Lift", a song by Joni Mitchell from the album Taming the Tiger

== See also ==
- Croydon facelift, a women's hairstyle
- Debbie Travis' Facelift, a Canadian home-improvement television program
- Window dressing
