= Suspension lift =

Vehicle modification to raise ride height

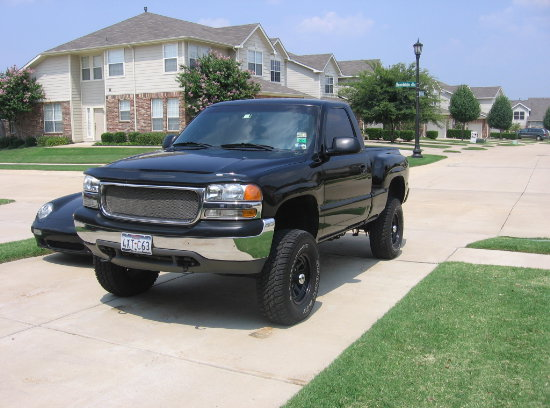
A 2001 GMC Sierra Stepside with a 6" suspension lift

A suspension lift is a modification to a vehicle to raise the ride height. It is done for the purpose of improving the off road performance of SUVs or trucks and other off-road vehicles, or for cosmetic purposes. Suspension lifts can enable steeper approach, departure, and breakover angles, higher ground clearance, and helps accommodate larger wheels and tires. Due to the raised center of gravity, maximum safe operating angles can be reduced and roadholding is often significantly impaired. Sensors, transmitters and cameras may need to be recalibrated, physically relocated or modified to maintain normal functioning of features like Autonomous Emergency Braking (AEB), adaptive cruise control (ACC), or Tesla Full Self-Driving. Suspension lifts are also found on a number of high performance sports cars, in which a very low ground clearance is used to improve handling, using an aerodynamic effect known as downforce; examples include the Ferrari 488, Lamborghini Huracan, McLaren 720S, and the second generation Ford GT. Such vehicles activate the suspension lift while traversing road bumps and ramps to avoid damaging the front underbody of the vehicle when driving on public roads; the suspension lift is deactivated on race tracks and level roads.

A lift kit is an aftermarket product package with the parts needed to lift a specific model of vehicle, typically with instructions and customer support. Some kits may have only critical or difficult to obtain parts, needing generic or off the shelf hardware and parts to complete the lift. Some lifts need only a few parts, like lift blocks, the spacers placed between the axles and leaf springs, and coil spring/strut spacers and extended shocks, and special driveshafts, axles, and more. More extensive lifts require many new suspension, steering, and drivetrain parts, such as replacement control arms, trailing arms, custom four-link systems, and drive shafts. These changes may be necessary because raising the vehicle's ride height can impact drive shaft length, steering geometry, and brake lines. Legality is often an issue when installing suspension lifts, as many jurisdictions have varying laws on vehicle ride height and placement of lights and bumpers.

== Leaf spring lift ==
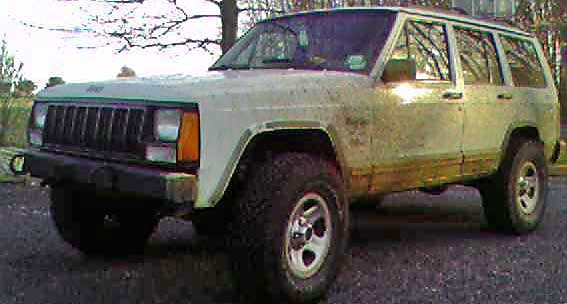
Jeep Cherokee with 2 in (51 mm) suspension lift on 31 in (790 mm) diameter BFG all-terrain tires, using add-a-leaf and coil spring spacers

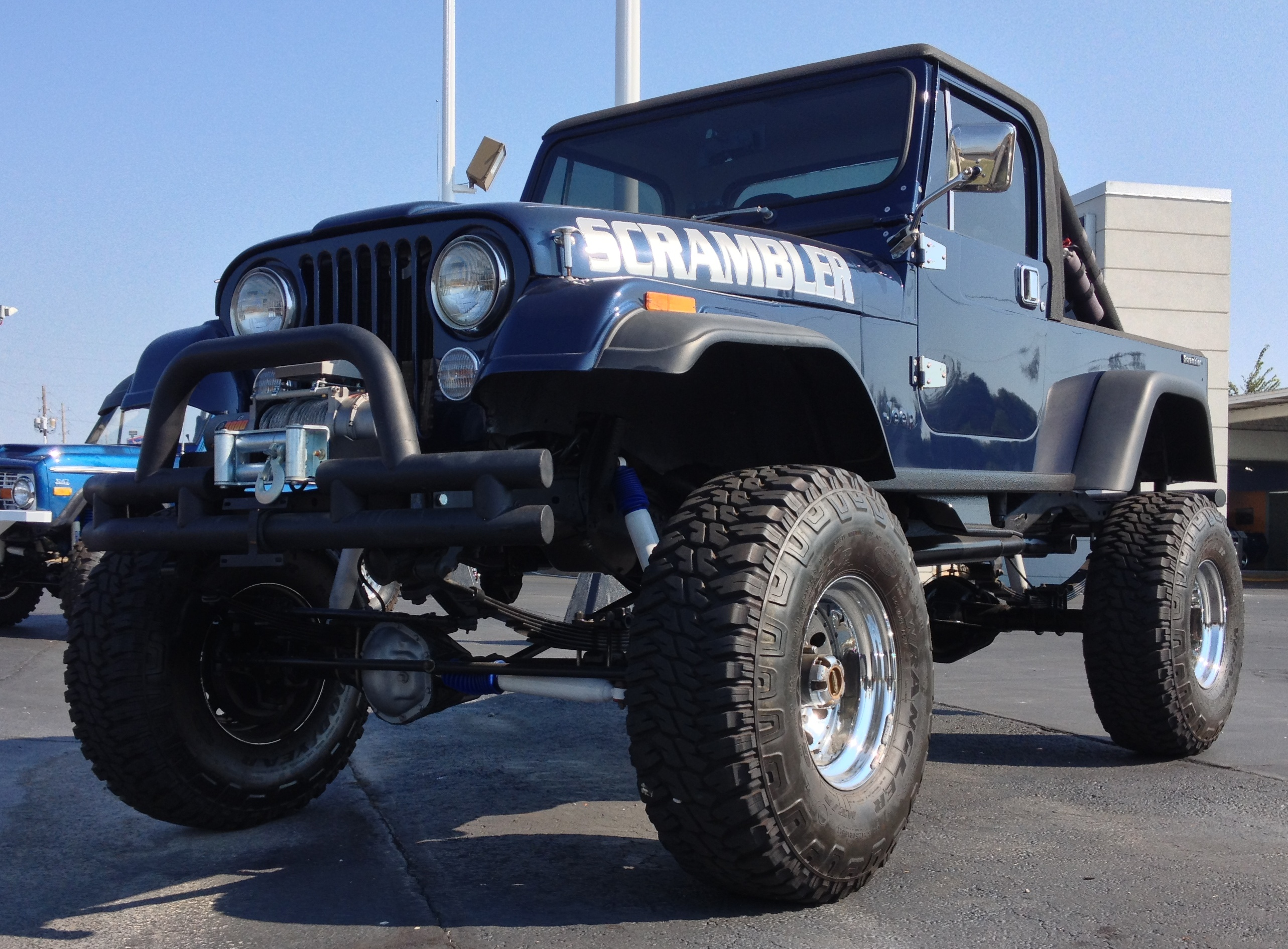
The Jeep CJ vehicles had leaf spring suspension on both axles, which rendered the lifting process relatively simple. In this case, an inherent disadvantage of extreme lifting becomes obvious – the owner had to install a step below the door to be able to enter the car.

Many trucks are supported by leaf spring suspensions. Leaf springs offer exceptional articulation, a large payload and can take a substantial amount of abuse. With the correct methods they can be modified to help a vehicle carry more weight, have better articulation or to fit large oversized tires. Some vehicles may be equipped with front and rear leaf springs or just rear leaf springs with independent front suspension.

Some methods of lifting are good for the rear, but not for the front, such as lifting blocks. Lifting the rear with blocks is a common way to achieve the desired height. This is done by installing a block, of the desired height of lift, in between the leaf spring and leaf spring perch and installing longer U-bolts. It is a bad method for the front primarily because of safety issues while braking. When braking, the front wheels create the majority of the braking force. The block moves this lateral force, caused by braking, higher above the axle than it did in the stock form. This can cause the block to become displaced from its location and result in total loss of control.

A more accepted way to build up the leaf springs is by using an add-a-leaf. This is done by inserting an extra leaf into the vehicle's leaf pack. Using the add-a-leaf will increase the height, but sometimes makes the suspension ride rough because of the added spring rate. With an adequate budget, the best way to lift with leaf springs is to buy a new set with the lift built in. An add-a-leaf depends on the integrity of the old springs. They may be a bit worn out, so when the lift is installed, the proposed 2 inch leaves may only have lifted the truck 1.5 inches. The new leaf spring pack will not be fatigued and will give the true lift desired. These packs can be bought at various increments of lift and can be combined with lifting shackles to give the proper setup.

== Leveling kit and airbag spring helpers ==
Typically vehicles have slightly less ride height in front in comparison to rear, caused by weaker spring. This is to compensate for spring sag as more cargo is loaded in the back. A leveling kit usually consists of stronger front springs to lift the front end ride height so that it matches the rear ride height. This gives a more balanced/level look to the vehicle when unloaded/empty and increases offroad capability/angles at the cost of less traction, handling, aerodynamics and head lifting when loaded with cargo in the back.

Airbag spring helpers, commonly referred to as "airbags" or erroneously as "air suspension" are (reinforced) rubber bladders fitted inside coil springs or on top of leaf spring packs. They serve to solve the issues caused by rear spring sag when loaded as mentioned above (in the leveling kit section). They can also help with uneven (side to side) loading or towing trailers with high pin weight requirements. Those bladders maybe manually inflated with a bicycle hand pump, by an integrated electric pump or automatically according to weight sensors, leveling sensors and computers.

== Hydraulic lift ==
There are two main types, one that replaces the regular suspension components and another that mounts on top of the coil overs. Both types may have height or feel adjustments powered by an external hydraulic system. The type that mounts on top of coil overs can quickly adjust ride height without changing pre-existing suspension geometry, settings and capabilities, often increasing ride height by a dozen inches or more.

== Air strut ==
Air strut also known as full air suspension, air lift or just air suspension is a system that fully replaces struts, springs, coil overs and shocks. Unlike airbag spring helpers they can have a significant increase in passenger comfort and handling. The suspension height and feel is adjusted manually via an electric air compressor and air pressure may be maintained by computer(s). Due to high cost, air strut is typically only used in luxury, sports or show cars. Hardcore offroad or overlanding vehicles typically do not use air strut due to reliability and durability issues. A lack of parts availability in remote areas and difficulty of bush mechanics/diy adhoc repair.
