= Ride height =

Distance between the base of a tire and the lowest point of the automobile

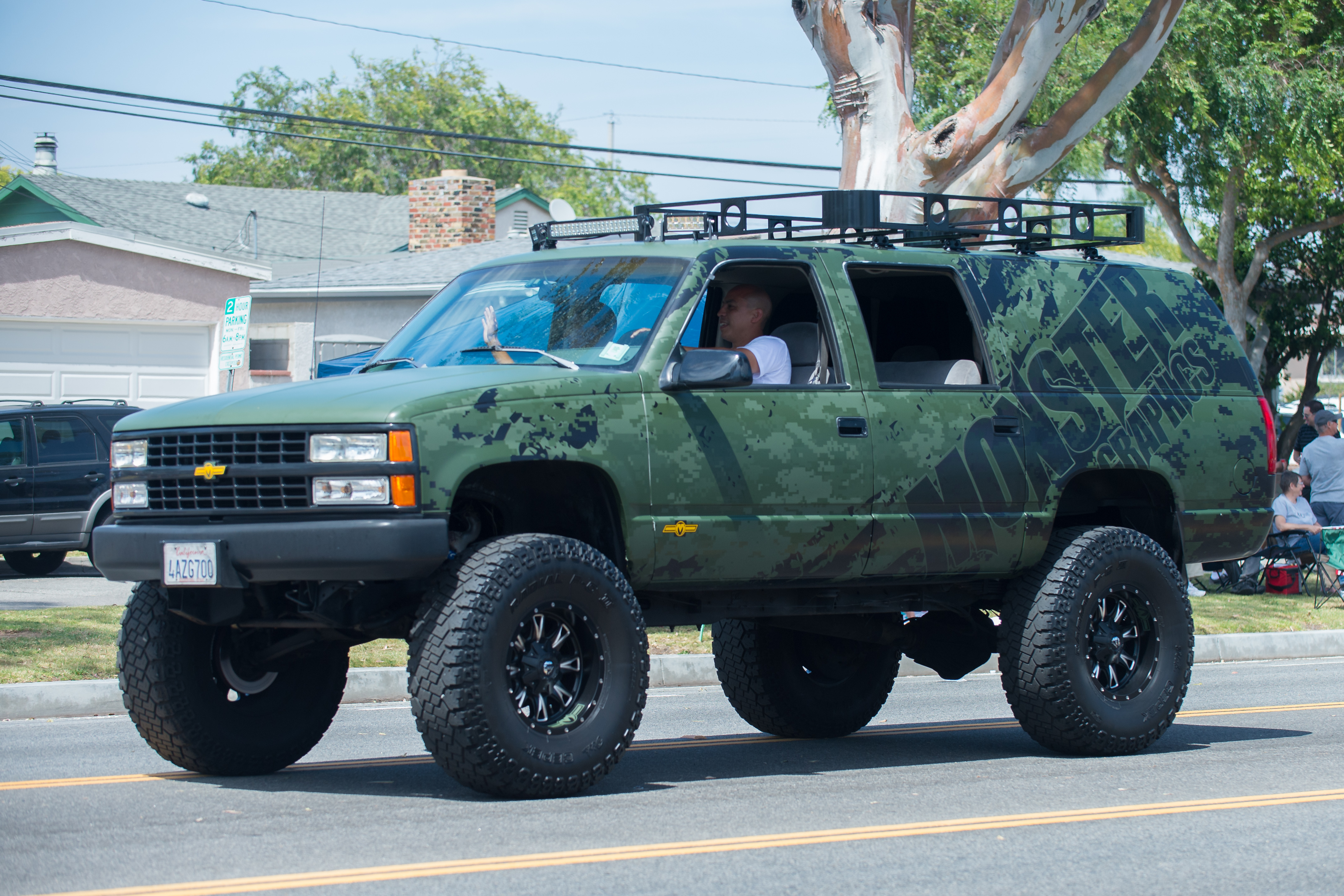
Chevrolet Suburban raised with aftermarket wheels and suspension mods – note much greater ground clearance under front with independent suspension, compared to under rear live axle differential.

Ride height or ground clearance is the amount of space between the base of an automobile tire and the lowest point of the automobile, typically the bottom exterior of the differential housing (even though the lower shock mounting point may be lower); or, more properly, to the shortest distance between a flat, level surface, and the lowest part of a vehicle other than those parts designed to contact the ground (such as tires, tracks, skis, etc.). Ground clearance is measured with standard vehicle equipment, and for cars, is usually given with no cargo or passengers.

== Function ==
Ground clearance affects breakover angle of a car. (β° = Breakover angle; C = Underside of chassis; W = Wheel; G = Ground; M = Midpoint of wheelbase)

Ground clearance is a critical factor in several important characteristics of a vehicle. For all vehicles, especially cars, variations in clearance represent a trade-off between handling, ride quality, and practicality.

A higher ride height and ground clearance means that the wheels have more vertical room to travel and absorb road shocks. Also, the car is more capable of being driven on surfaces that are not level, without the scraping against surface obstacles and possibly damaging the chassis and underbody.

For a higher ride height, the center of mass of the car is higher, which makes for less precise and more dangerous handling characteristics (most notably, the chance of rollover is higher). Higher ride heights will typically adversely affect aerodynamic properties. This is why sports cars typically have very low clearances, while off-road vehicles and SUVs have higher ones.

Ride height or ground clearance is an important parameter in the design of pickup trucks and SUVs, particularly for off-road capability and obstacle negotiation. Over time, pickup trucks have generally increased in size and complexity, reflecting broader changes in automotive engineering. New variants have been introduced that incorporate new technologies. For example, the Toyota Tacoma — several variants have been released, allowing customers to choose models suited to different off-road conditions.

== Example ride heights ==
A road car usually has a ride height around 16–17 cm (6.3–6.7 in), while an SUV usually lies around 19–22 cm (7.5–8.7 in). Two well-known extremes are the Ferrari F40 with a 12.5 cm (4.9 in) ride height and the Hummer H1 with a 40.64 cm (16.0 in) ride height.

The table below provides average ride height for different car types which were available on the market in India in 2020:

Avg. ride height	Car type
135–140 mm (5.3–5.5 in)	Sports car
165 mm (6.5 in)	Sedan
168 mm (6.6 in)	Hatchback
170 mm (6.7 in)	Compact car
190–200 mm (7.5–7.9 in)	Compact SUV
225 mm (8.9 in)	SUV

== Specialized uses ==
=== Underslung frame ===
Some cars have used underslung frames to achieve a lower ride height and the consequent improvement in center of gravity. The 1905–14 cars of the American Motor Car Company are one example.

=== Self-leveling ===
Self-leveling suspension systems are designed to maintain a constant ride height regardless of load. The suspension detects the load via mechanical or electronic means and raises or lowers the vehicle, by inflating cylinders in the suspension to lift the chassis higher. Vehicles not equipped with self-leveling will pitch down at one end when laden; this adversely affects ride, handling, and aerodynamic properties.

=== Height adjustable ===
Some modern automobiles (such as the Audi Allroad Quattro and Tesla Model S) have height adjustable suspension, which can vary the ride height by adjusting the hydropneumatic suspension or air suspension. This adjustment can be automatic, depending on road conditions, and/or the settings selected by the driver. Many buses include a kneeling feature to make it easier for passengers to board and alight, and a ferry lift feature to increase the ground clearance, which is useful for steep ground transitions, such as driving onto ferries, as the name suggests.

=== Adjustable shock absorber ===
Other, simpler suspension systems, such as coilover springs, offer a way of manually adjusting ride height (and often, spring stiffness) by compressing the spring in situ, using a threaded shaft and adjustable knob or nut.

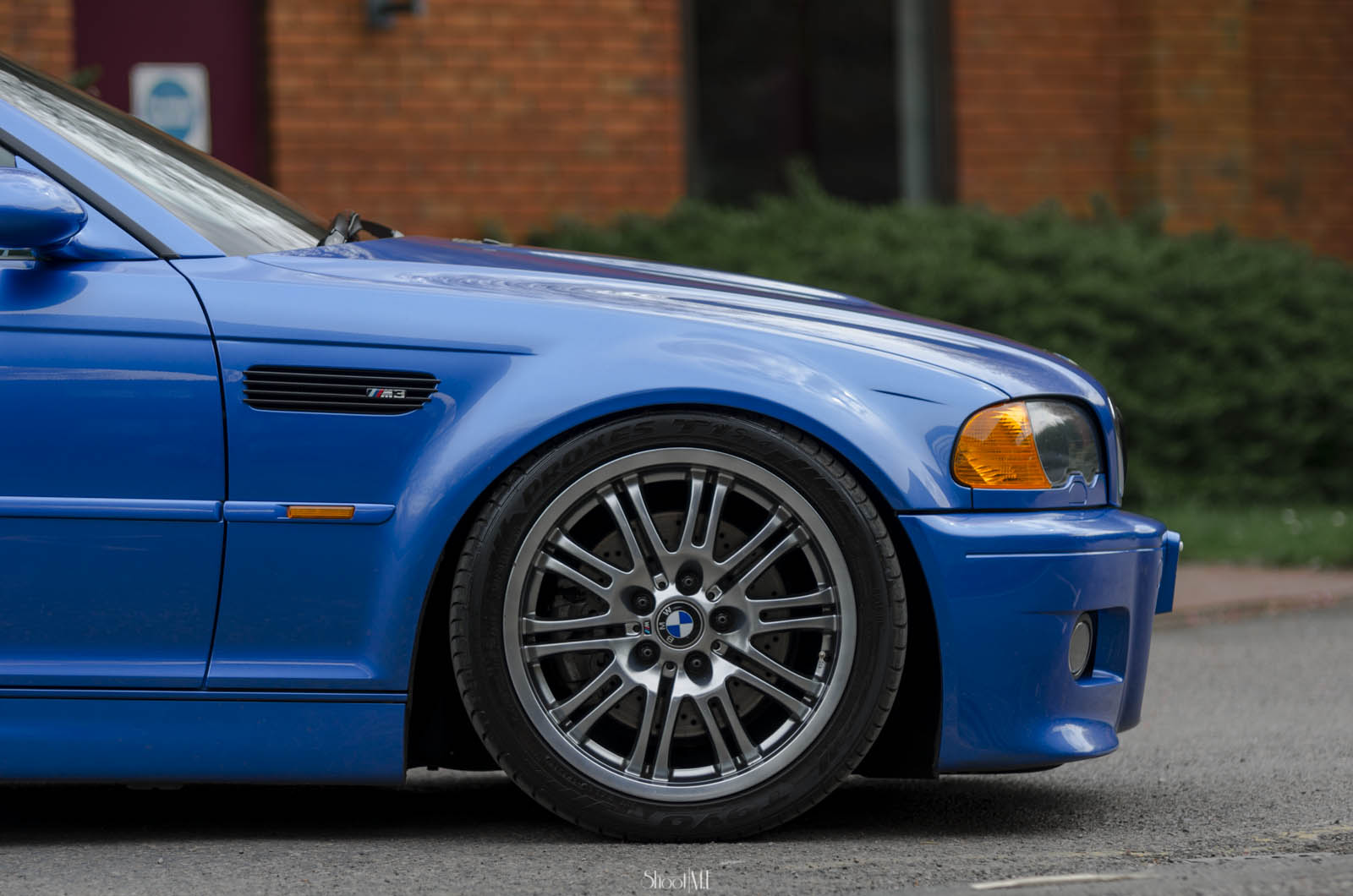
BMW E46 "stanced" using aftermarket suspension kit

=== Aftermarket ===
Lowering a car's suspension is a common and relatively inexpensive aftermarket modification. Many car enthusiasts prefer the more aggressive look of a lowered body, and there is an easily realized car handling improvement from the lower center of gravity. Most passenger cars are produced such that one or two inches of lowering will not significantly increase the probability of damage. On most automobiles, ride height is modified by changing the length of the suspension springs, and is the essence of many aftermarket suspension kits supplied by manufacturers such as KW, Eibach, and H&R. For trucks, lifted trucks are popular with truck owners, who often upsize their wheels and tires when lifting their vehicles.

=== Military ===
For armored fighting vehicles (AFV), ground clearance presents an additional factor in a vehicle's overall performance: a lower ground clearance means that the vehicle minus the chassis is lower to the ground and thus harder to spot and harder to hit. The final design of any AFV reflects a compromise between being a smaller target on one hand, and having greater battlefield mobility on the other. Very few AFVs have top speeds at which car-like handling becomes an issue, though rollovers can and do occur. By contrast, an AFV is far more likely to need high ground clearance than a road vehicle.

=== Trucks ===
MUTCD warning sign for a low-ground-clearance crossing

18-wheel tractor-trailers also have to take the ground clearance of both their tractor and especially trailer into consideration on certain areas of uneven terrain, such as raised railroad crossings. Their extremely long wheelbase means that such terrain could potentially catch the undercarriage of the trailer in the wide space between the axles, potentially leaving the truck stuck with no means to extricate itself.

=== Buses ===
In some areas (such as South Australia) buses are required to have a ground clearance of at least 100 mm (3 15/16 in). Too much ride height can cause the vehicle to have an excessively high center of gravity, which could cause the vehicle to be unstable or even flip.

== Types of ground clearance ==
=== Axle clearance ===
Colloquially referred to as differential clearance or diff clearance. Distance from bottom exterior of axle housing or bottom exterior of differential housing, whichever is lower, to the ground.

=== Suspension clearance ===
Distance between bottom of suspension components to ground. In vehicles with independent suspension this is typically the distance between the bottom of the lower control arm and the ground.

=== Running clearance ===
Distance between the bottom of the lowest sprung mass and the ground.

== See also ==
- Approach and departure angles
- Body lift
- Breakover angle
- Center of mass, automotive applications
- Clearance
- Height adjustable suspension
- Loading gauge
- Speed bump
- Suspension lift
- Lowrider
- Turning diameter
