= Approach and departure angles =

Characteristics of a vehicle

Approach (α) and departure angle (β) of a vehicle

Approach angle is the maximum angle of a ramp onto which a vehicle can climb from a horizontal plane without interference. It is defined as the angle between the ground and the line drawn between the front tire and the lowest-hanging part of the vehicle at the front overhang. Departure angle is its counterpart at the rear of the vehicle – the maximum ramp angle from which the car can descend without damage. Approach and departure angles are also referred to as ramp angles.

Approach and departure angles are indicators of off-road ability of the vehicle: they indicate how steep an obstacle, such as a rock or log, the vehicle can negotiate according to its body shape alone.

== See also ==
- Breakover angle
- Overhang (automotive)
- Ride height
