= Jason Plato =

British racing driver (born 1967)

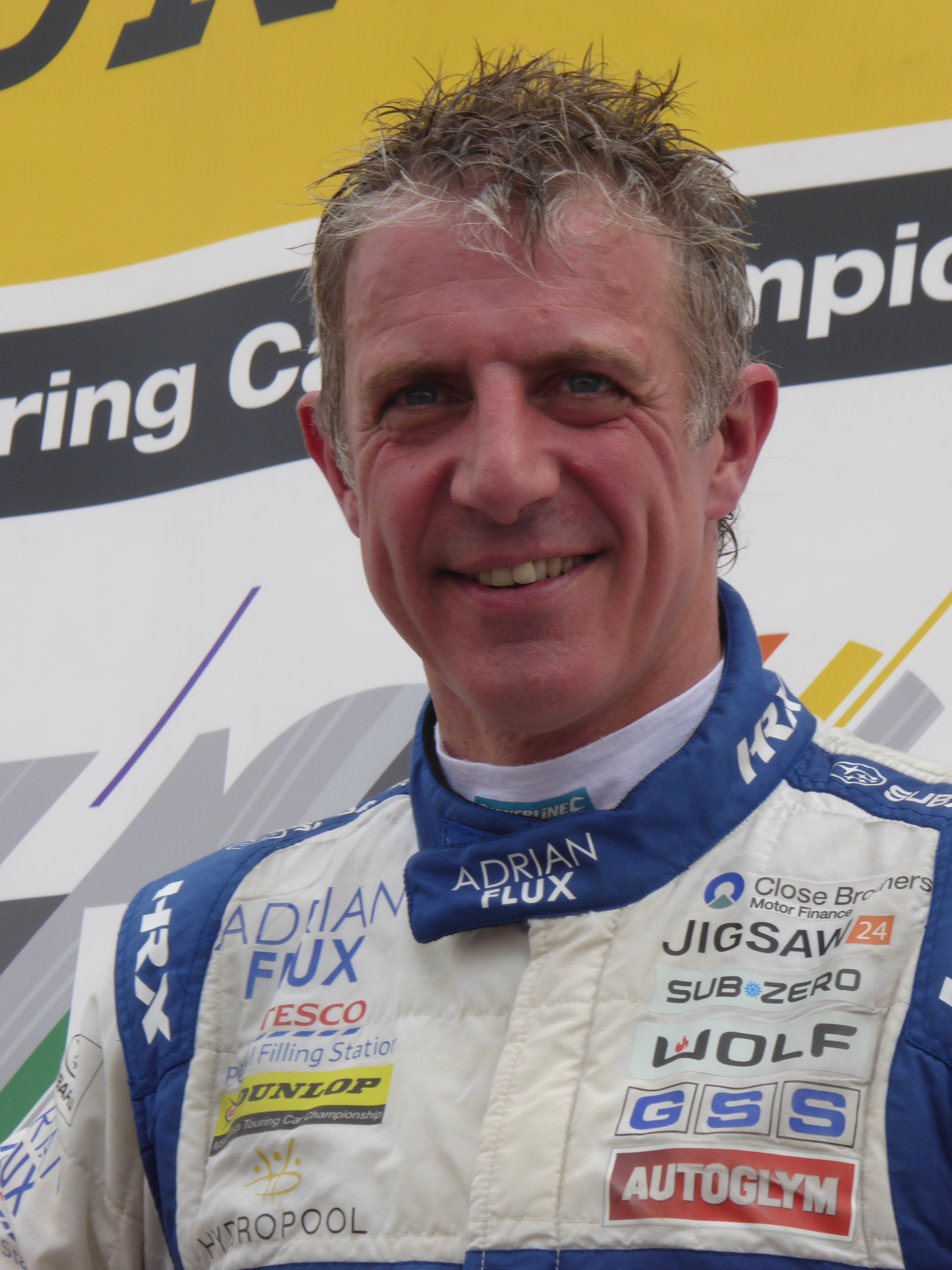
- Plato at the Knockhill round of the 2017 British Touring Car Championship
- Nationality: (United Kingdom) British
- Born: Timothy Jason Plato; 14 October 1967 (age 59) Oxford, England

British Touring Car Championship career
- Debut season: 1997
- Categorisation: FIA Silver
- Former teams: Williams Renault; Vauxhall; SEAT Sport UK; Silverline Chevrolet; MG KX Clubcard Fuel Save; Adrian Flux Subaru Racing; Adrian Flux with Power Maxed Racing
- Starts: 659
- Championships: 2 (2001, 2010)
- Wins: 97
- Podiums: 233
- Poles: 51
- Fastest laps: 86

Previous series
- 2005 2002 1996 1990–91, 1995 1992 1991: WTCC; ASCAR; Renault Spider Cup; Formula Renault GB; British F3; Formula Renault Eurocup

Championship titles
- 2001, 2010 1996 1991: BTCC; Renault Spider Cup; Formula Renault Eurocup

Timothy Jason Plato (born 14 October 1967) is a British former racing driver and former team principal/founder of Plato Racing. He last competed professionally in the 2022 British Touring Car Championship for BTC Racing. He has twice been BTCC Champion, in 2001 for Vauxhall and 2010 for Silverline Chevrolet.

Plato has finished in the top-three in the Championship 13 times and holds the record for the most overall race wins in the BTCC with 97 (94 overall) and 3 extra class wins. He has also served as a presenter on the motoring television series Fifth Gear since 2004.

== Career history ==
After success in karting including a 1989 British Championship win in the Junior TKM Class, Oxford-born Plato raced in Formula Three and Formula Renault. In 1996, he entered the Renault Spider championship, taking a dominant title win.

=== BTCC (1997–2001) ===
==== Williams Renault (1997–1999) ====
In 1997, Plato gained the second drive in the Williams-Renault BTCC team, after Frank Williams organised a test between him, Gianni Morbidelli and Jean-Christophe Boullion with the fastest getting the contract offer. After being overlooked by Williams, Plato travelled to the Williams base and after some convincing, Sir Frank gave Plato the drive.

Plato took pole for his first three races in the Renault Laguna, and ultimately won two races as a rookie, taking third in the championship which was won by his team-mate Alain Menu. He was fifth in the series in each of the next two years.

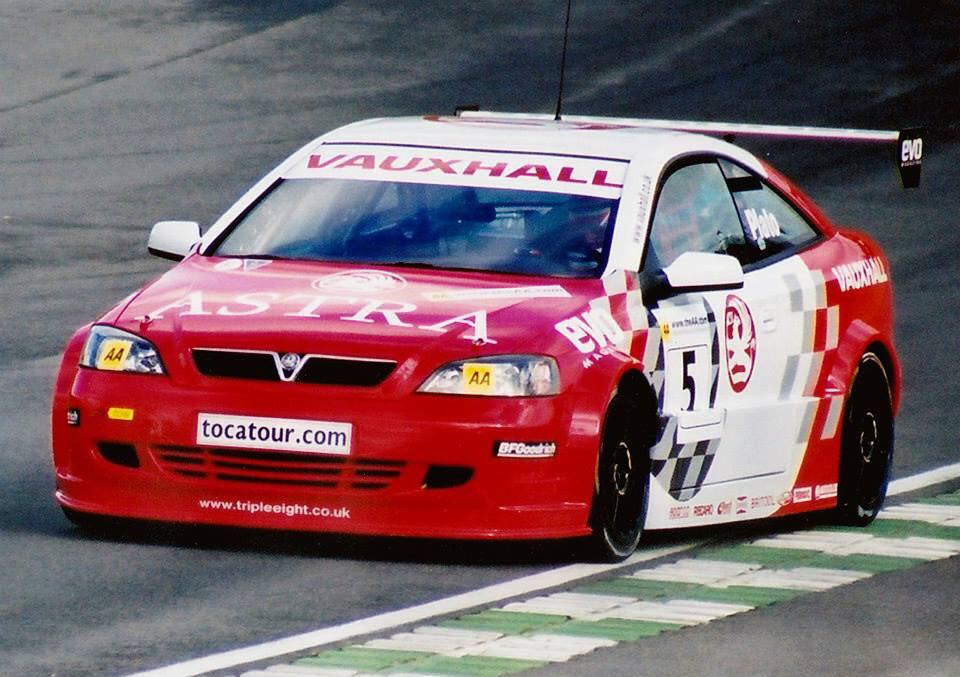
Plato driving for Vauxhall at Brands Hatch during the 2001 British Touring Car Championship season.

==== Vauxhall (2000–2001) ====
Plato joined Vauxhall in 2000, again taking fifth place in the championship. For 2001, the series had a new set of reduced-cost rules, fewer big-name drivers as a result, and Vauxhall had by far the best car. In a contentious and hard-fought season, Plato won the championship after team-mate Yvan Muller's car caught fire at the last round.

=== ASCAR and Break from BTCC (2002–2003) ===
With an ambition to get into NASCAR racing, Plato moved to the British ASCAR stock car scene in 2002, finishing third in the championship for XCEL Motorsport Ford Taurus.

In 2003, Plato was a driver coach for SEAT, returning to the BTCC with the Spanish team in 2004.

=== BTCC return (2004–2022) ===
==== SEAT (2004–2008) ====
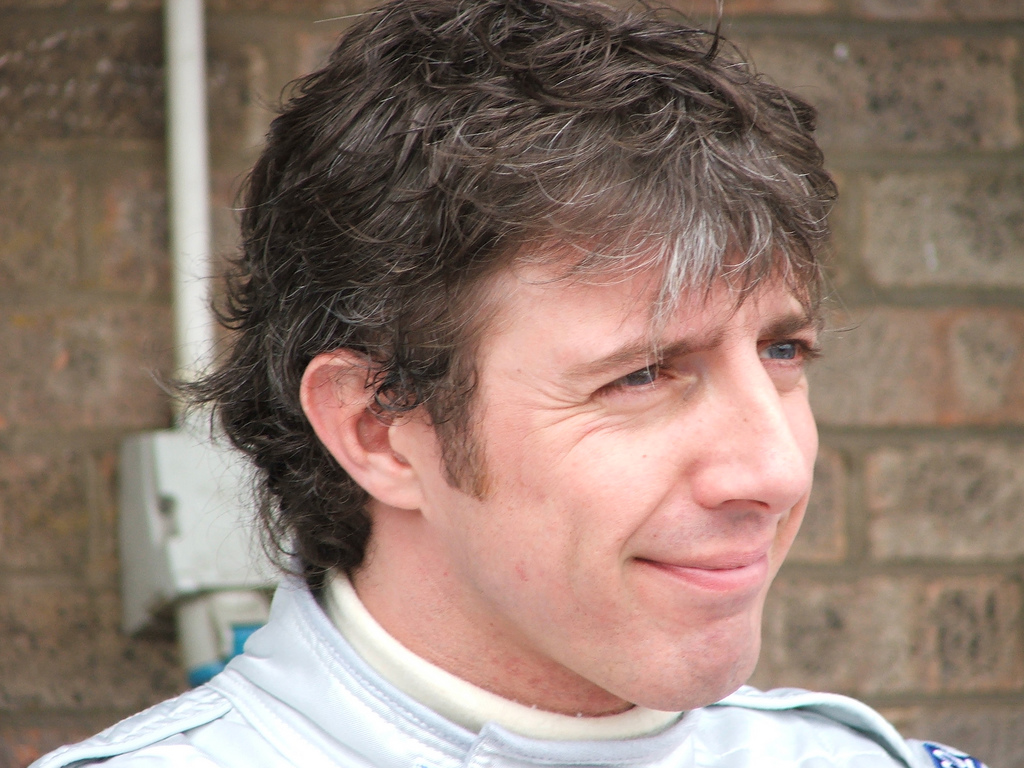
Plato, at Donington Park during the 2005 British Touring Car Championship.

Plato was employed by SEAT to help with their driver development in 2003, and when they entered a BTCC team in 2004, he was the natural choice to lead the team. However the new SEAT Toledo needed developing if it were to become a race winner. Despite the development work needed, the car proved to be a winner right from the start, with Plato going on to win more races than any other driver (seven in total), finishing third overall in the championship. The regulations for 2004 meant that the driver who finished tenth in the first of the meeting's three races had pole (and a light car) for race 2, and the winner of race 2 had pole for race 3 (although with a now-heavier car). As a result of this, the championship rules were changed to reversing the top-ten of the race 3 grid, putting an end to this tactic, and the pace of Matt Neal's Team Dynamics Honda and Yvan Muller's Vauxhall left Plato unable to challenge for a second title in 2005. He finished fourth in the 2005 championship with only three wins to his credit during the season, with the team now run by Northern South.

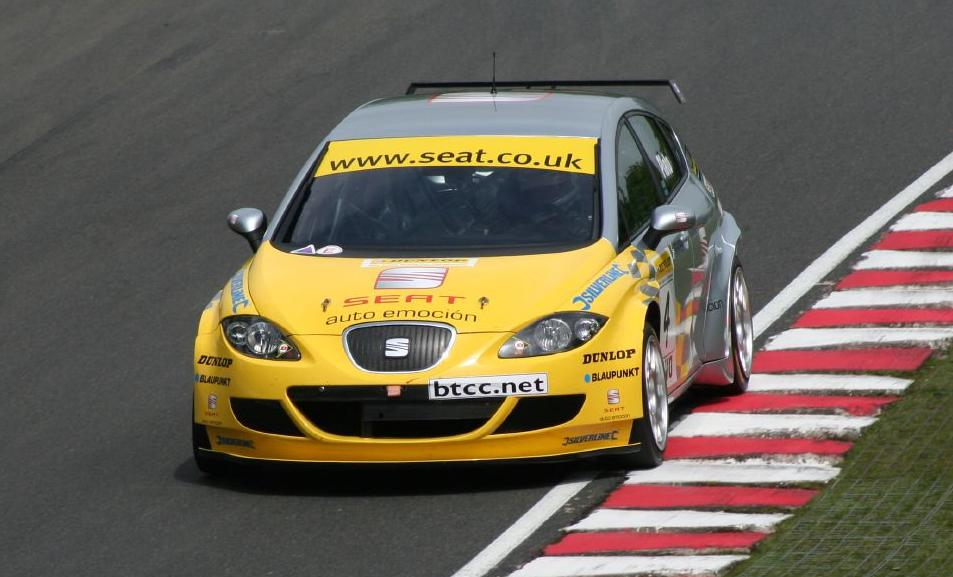
Plato driving for SEAT at the Oulton Park round of the 2006 British Touring Car Championship.

For 2006, Plato continued in the British Touring Car Championship as lead driver for SEAT and their new León touring car. He was the only driver in the three-driver team to compete in all ten meetings – his team-mates, double BTCC champion James Thompson and ex-DTM driver Darren Turner, shared the team's second Leon. After the first three meetings, he was a point behind Thompson and third in the championship, but had two retirements in the races at Thruxton. After winning race 1 at Croft, race 2 was his 200th start, and he nearly won, but Matt Neal passed him with two laps to go. He won two out of the three races at Brands Hatch to keep his faint hopes of winning the BTCC in 2006 alive, but a poor qualifying run at Silverstone finally ended his hopes. He beat Colin Turkington to second in the championship, meaning that he had then finished in each of the top-five championship positions.

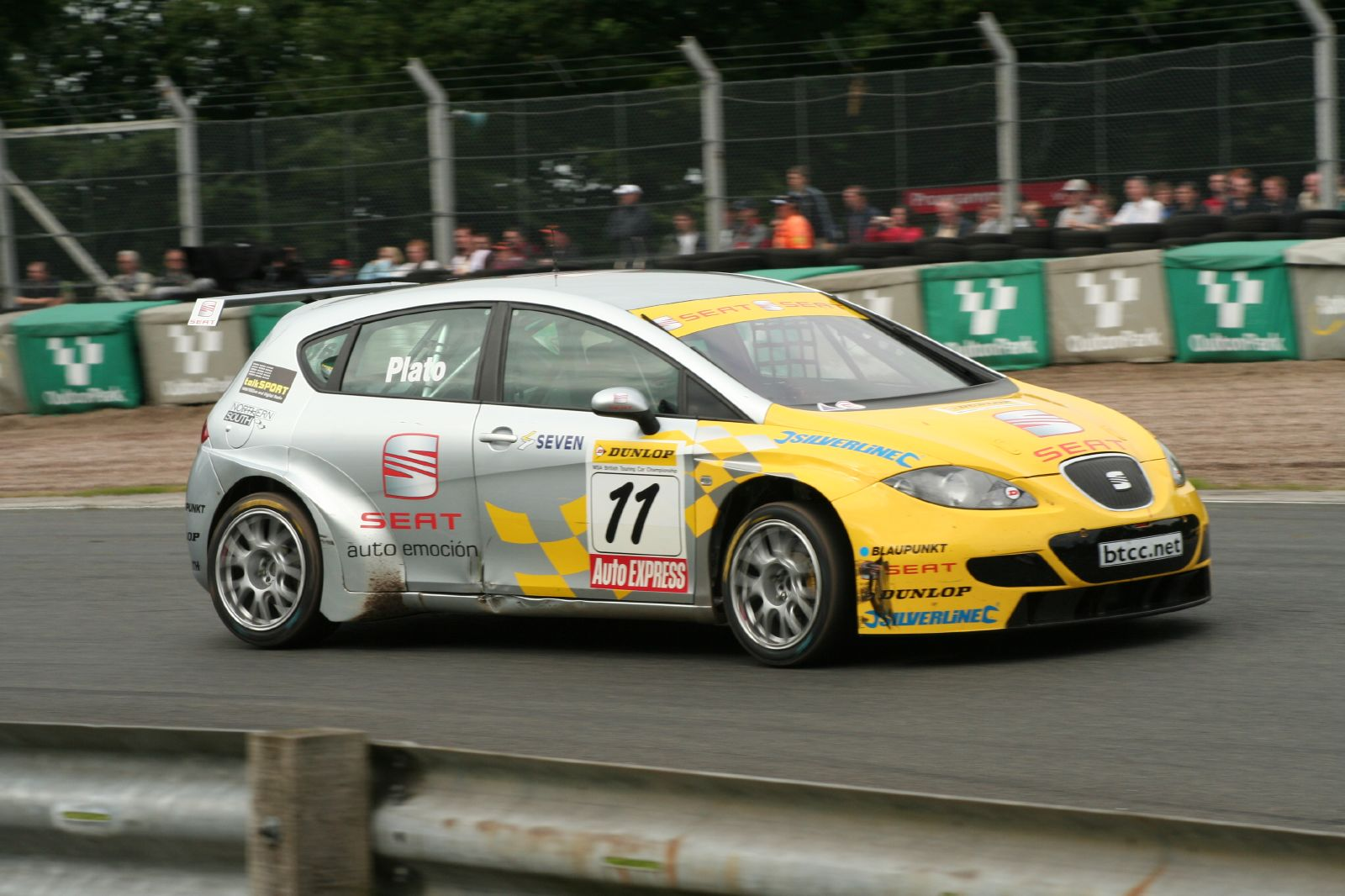
Plato driving for SEAT at the Oulton Park round of the 2007 British Touring Car Championship.

Winning the first two races of 2007 set the tone for a title battle with Fabrizio Giovanardi's Vauxhall. Giovanardi took the series lead at Knockhill but Plato retook it at Donington Park after fighting from ninth on the grid to come fifth in race 1 and then win race 2. He started race 3 from ninth (after spinning this position on the grid-reversal wheel) but fought through to take the lead from Mike Jordan, with some uncertainty over whether he had passed under a yellow flag. To ensure that he was not penalised, he allowed Jordan to repass him, before retaking the lead a lap later. The battle went to the final round, with Giovanardi winning by three points to take the championship, with Plato declaring that "Fabrizio beat us the right way. He is a very worthy champion and there were no shenanigans between me and him."

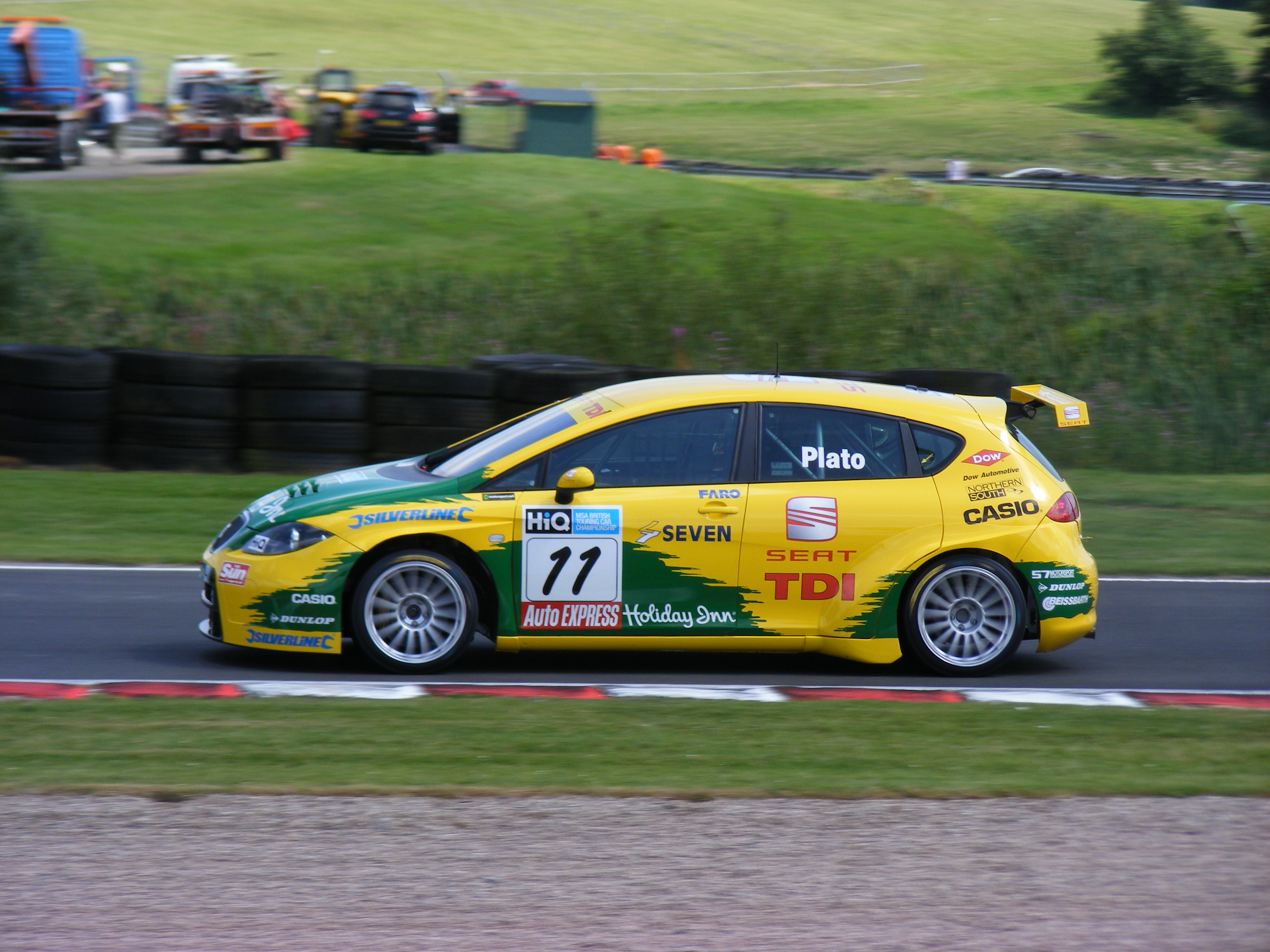
Plato driving the diesel-powered SEAT León at Oulton Park during the 2008 British Touring Car Championship season.

In 2008, the team switched to a diesel-powered León. The first win for a diesel car in the BTCC came in round 7 at Donington Park. Two wins at Snetterton helped him to close the gap on Giovanardi, but a mechanical failure in race 3 was a precursor to a similar problem in race 2 at Oulton Park, after winning race 1. These issues typified a season in which performance was not matched by reliability, despite the same cars being largely reliable in the World Touring Car Championship. Plato went into the final rounds at Brands Hatch still mathematically in with a chance of the title, but admitted that the large points difference between his and Giovanardi's made this unrealistic. Both he and Giovanardi had poor final rounds at Brands, allowing Mat Jackson to leapfrog Plato for second overall in his privateer BMW.

==== RML Chevrolet (2009–2011) ====
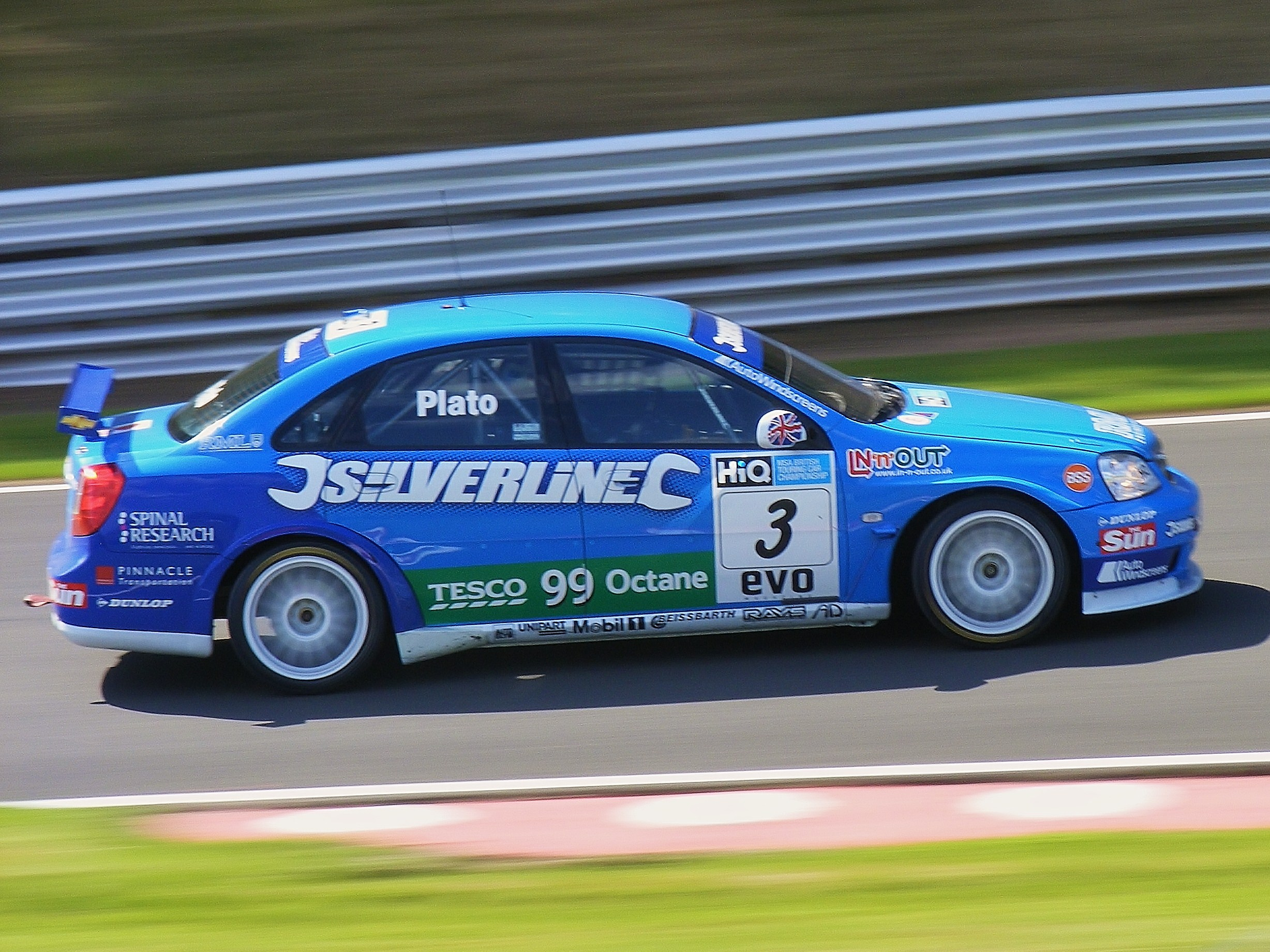
Plato finished 2nd in the 2009 British Touring Car Championship with Chevrolet

Plato's plans for 2009 had been affected by SEAT's shock announcement to pull their factory team out of the BTCC at the end of the 2008 season. It was speculated that Plato was planning to take a sabbatical from racing to focus on his TV work. However, after holding talks over the off-season with West Surrey Racing and Tempus Sport, Plato decided to return to the BTCC in a privately entered RML Group Chevrolet Lacetti. After the first meeting, the team secured sponsorship from Silverline power tools and Auto Windscreens for the rest of the season, and raced under the Racing Silverline banner. At the final round of the season at Brands Hatch, Plato became only the second driver after Dan Eaves at Thruxton in 2005 to win all three races, the first of which he won by a then closest-ever BTCC winning margin of 0.015 seconds, ahead of Tom Chilton. He finished second in the 2009 championship, five points behind champion Colin Turkington.

For 2010, RML became an official Chevrolet manufacturer team, racing the Cruze model that races in the World Touring Car Championship, with Plato as lead driver. Plato was a championship challenger immediately, with a double victory at Snetterton returning him to the championship lead. He dominated the second half of the season and claimed the 2010 MSA Dunlop British Touring Car Championship by winning round 29 at Brands Hatch on 10 October 2010. His win was also his 60th, equalling Andy Rouse's BTCC record.

Plato remained with the same team in 2011 and won the first round of the season at Brands Hatch, setting a new BTCC record of 61 victories. He came third in the Championship.

==== MG KX Momentum Racing (2012–2014) ====
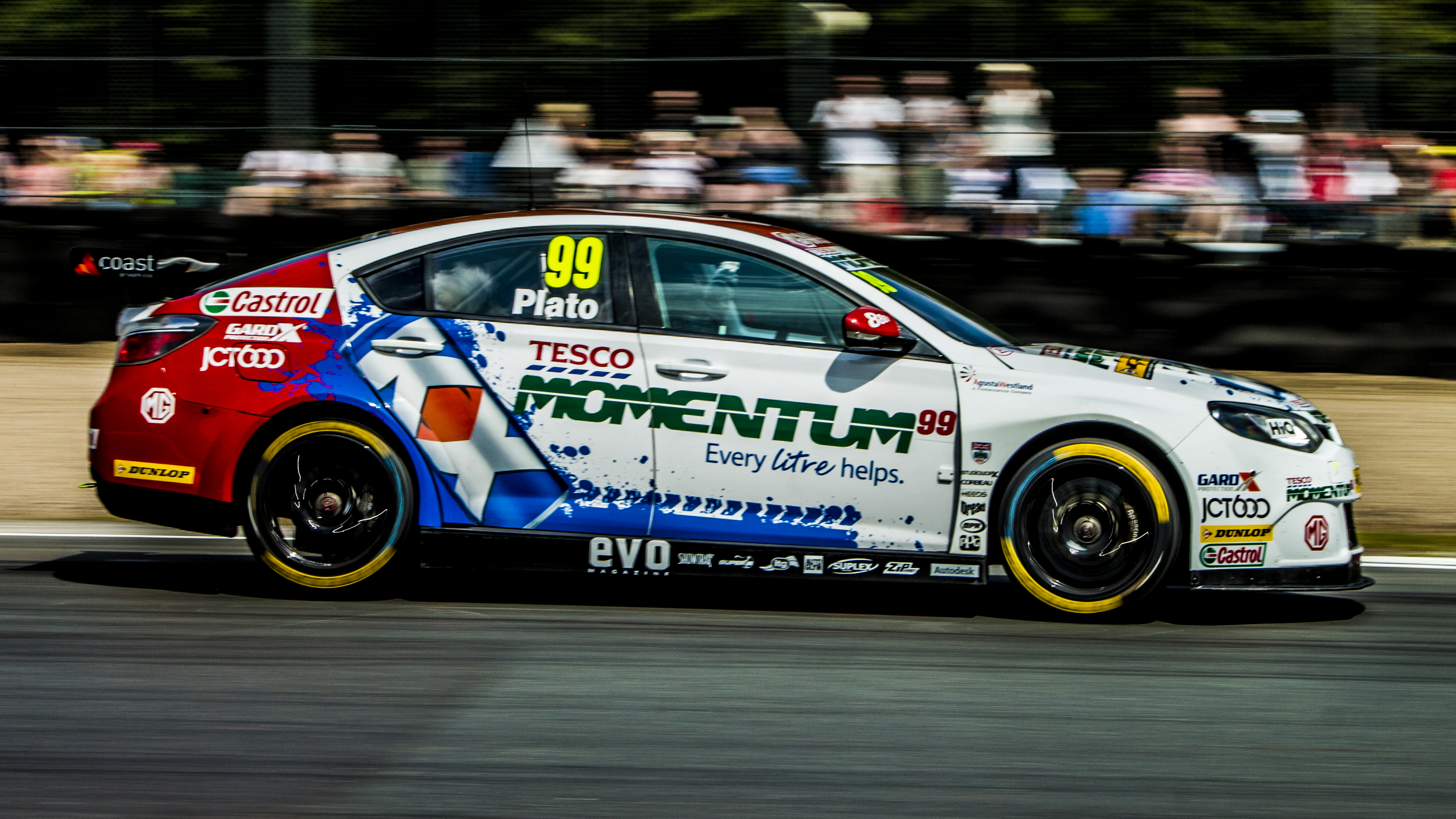
Plato at Oulton Park in 2013

In 2012 and 2013, Plato raced for the Triple Eight Race Engineering (United Kingdom) team in their MG KX Momentum Racing MG6 and came 3rd in the Championship in both years. In 2014, with a similar but differently-sponsored car (MG KX Clubcard Fuel Save) under the same team, he came second in the championship.

==== Team BMR (2015–2018) ====
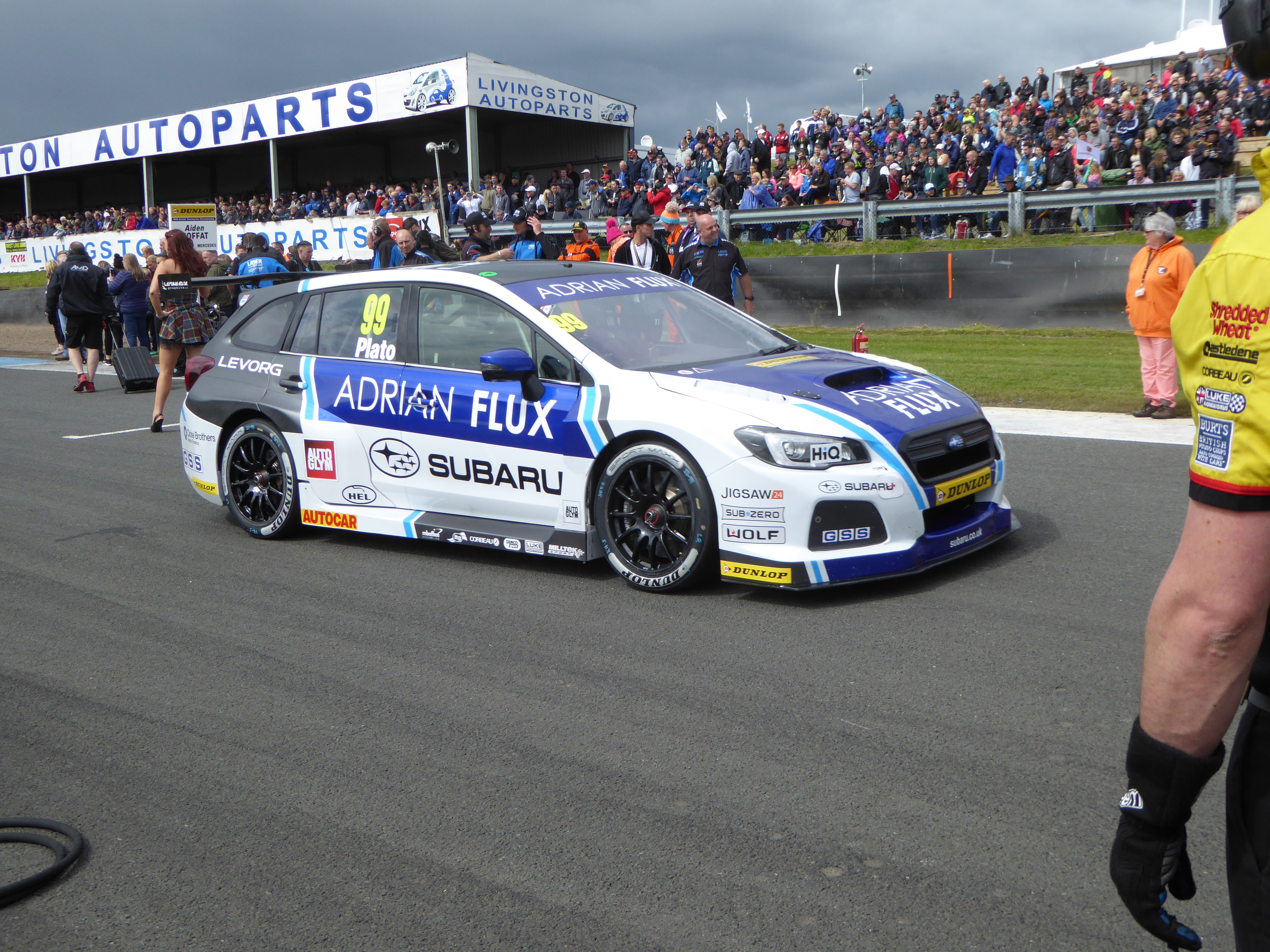
Plato, at the Knockhill round of the 2017 British Touring Car Championship.

On 17 February 2015, it was announced that Plato would be driving alongside Turkington, Aron Smith and Warren Scott for Team BMR during the 2015 BTCC season. He took 6 wins during the year but missed out on the title by four points.

In January 2016, it was announced that Team BMR would run four Subaru Levorgs for the season. A slow start saw Jason record a best finish of 13th at Brands Hatch. Once the team developed the Levorg into a race winning car, Plato took nine podiums along with a win at Knockhill in his 500th race. He continued with the team in 2017 but a crash at the first round at Brands Hatch derailed his season before it had begun. Permanent damage was sustained to the chassis of his car that plagued him with grip and under steer issues for the majority of the season. Nevertheless, he still took four podium finishes, including another win at Knockhill, and finished the season in 12th place in the standings.

Plato remained with BMR Subaru for 2018, as the team switched from using a Mountune engine to a Swindon engine in an effort to resolve the reliability issues that had hampered Plato's campaign the previous year. However, the change in engine proved to have a disastrous effect on the car's performance. Plato failed to score a point in any of the first four race meetings of the season and his only visit to the podium that season came with a second-place finish in the first race at Croft, as part of a Subaru 1-2. Plato would only score a further nine points all season after this, finishing in 27th place with a paltry 26 points.

==== Power Maxed Racing (2019–2021) ====
On 20 February 2019, it was announced that Plato would be switching to Power Maxed Racing, driving in the factory-backed Vauxhall Astra. He finished the championship in seventh place with a total of 237 points, with a win in the final race of the season.

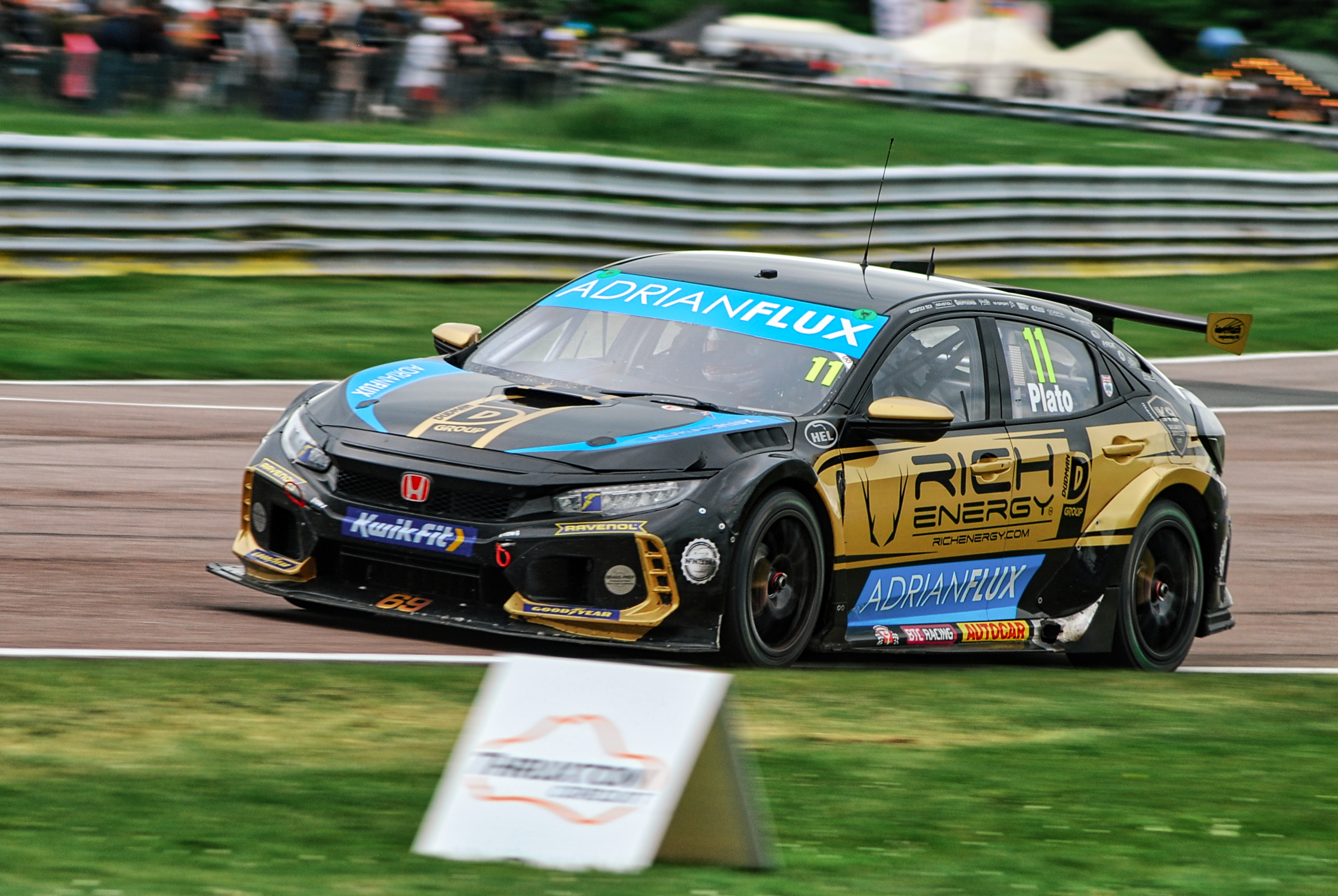
Plato competing at Thruxton during his final BTCC season.

For 2020, the team chose not to compete as a full time team, but retained Plato for 2021. 2021 saw the Vauxhall hampered by throttle linkage issues. Plato took one podium at the opening round at Thruxton, finishing the year in 14th place with 156 points.

==== BTC Racing (2022) ====
It was announced on 6 April 2022 that Plato would be joining BTC Racing for his 23rd and last season in the BTCC. He finished the year in 17th place, with a single podium at Snetterton.

=== Other racing ===
Plato competed in the Bathurst 1000 twice and the Sandown 500 once, but without any great success. His second attempt at Bathurst was with the Holden Racing Team and was driving with the late Peter Brock. Plato and Brock's race ended with Plato being involved in a crash which resulted in John Cleland's car rolling on to its roof.

In 1998, Plato took part in the Silverstone Rally Sprint, part of the British Rally Championship, driving a third works Renault Megane F2. He finished ninth, with co-driver Andy Wilman, (former) presenter and executive producer on Top Gear.

During his 2005 BTCC campaign, Plato competed in four rounds of the World Touring Car Championship (WTCC) for SEAT Sport. He achieved a second-place finish in race 2 of his home round FIA WTCC Race of UK at Silverstone. He also won a race and finished second overall in the 2005 European Touring Car Cup.

Plato often competes in historic racing and is a regular at the Goodwood Revival and Members meeting and teamed up with celebrity chef James Martin in a Ford Prefect and with Craig Davies in a Corvette Stingray for the 2012 event.

=== Television career ===
Plato is a co-presenter for the Channel 5 British TV series Fifth Gear co-starring with Tiff Needell, Vicki Butler-Henderson and Jonny Smith. He previously co-presented Channel 4's motoring programme 'Driven' alongside Mike Brewer, Penny Mallory and James May. Formerly with Tom Ford (presenter) as a fellow presenter, Plato appeared opposite Ford for an episode of Ready Steady Cook UK.

Plato was injured in a Caparo T1 supercar in October 2007 during filming for Fifth Gear at Bruntingthorpe proving ground. The car caught fire at an estimated 250 kilometres per hour (160 mph) and Plato described his injuries as follows:

“The back of my neck is burnt and so are my face and hands. I obviously couldn’t take my hands off the steering wheel whilst braking and my right hand is more badly burnt than my left."

Plato was taken from the scene by former BTCC driver Phil Bennett and after treatment at three hospitals, including Stoke Mandeville Hospital's specialist burns unit, Plato was able to compete in the following weekend's final race in the 2007 BTCC calendar. This incident was also mentioned on Top Gear, where Jeremy Clarkson called him a 'Baked Potato' after mispronouncing his name.

Plato presented the Sky One television programme Mission Implausible where he and Tania Zaetta competed to perform three stunts over the course of each episode.

=== Book ===
On 19 September 2019, Plato released his first autobiography titled How Not to Be a Professional Racing Driver. It was published by Penguin Books Ltd.

== Personal life ==
Plato was born in Oxford, Oxfordshire, England, and was educated at Chillingham Road Primary School.

== Other ventures ==
Plato is a brand ambassador of Tesco Momentum 99 Fuel, Jigsaw24 and AMX Home Automation Systems. He runs a marketing agency, Brand Pilot Ltd. On 30 March 2021, it was confirmed that Fuelling Around, the podcast that he co-hosts with Dave Vitty, was returning for a second series. The pair's motoring show held its first live show at Motorsport UK's new Bicester home on 23 September 2021.

At the Silverstone round of the 2025 British Touring Car Championship, Jason Plato stated in an ITV Sport interview with Louise Goodman that he would establish his own team for the 2026 season. Later in 2025, Plato confirmed that the team would be run in collaboration with RML Group. On 8 January 2026, Plato announced that his new BTCC team, Plato Racing, would use the Mercedes-AMG A35 as their car during the 2026 season.

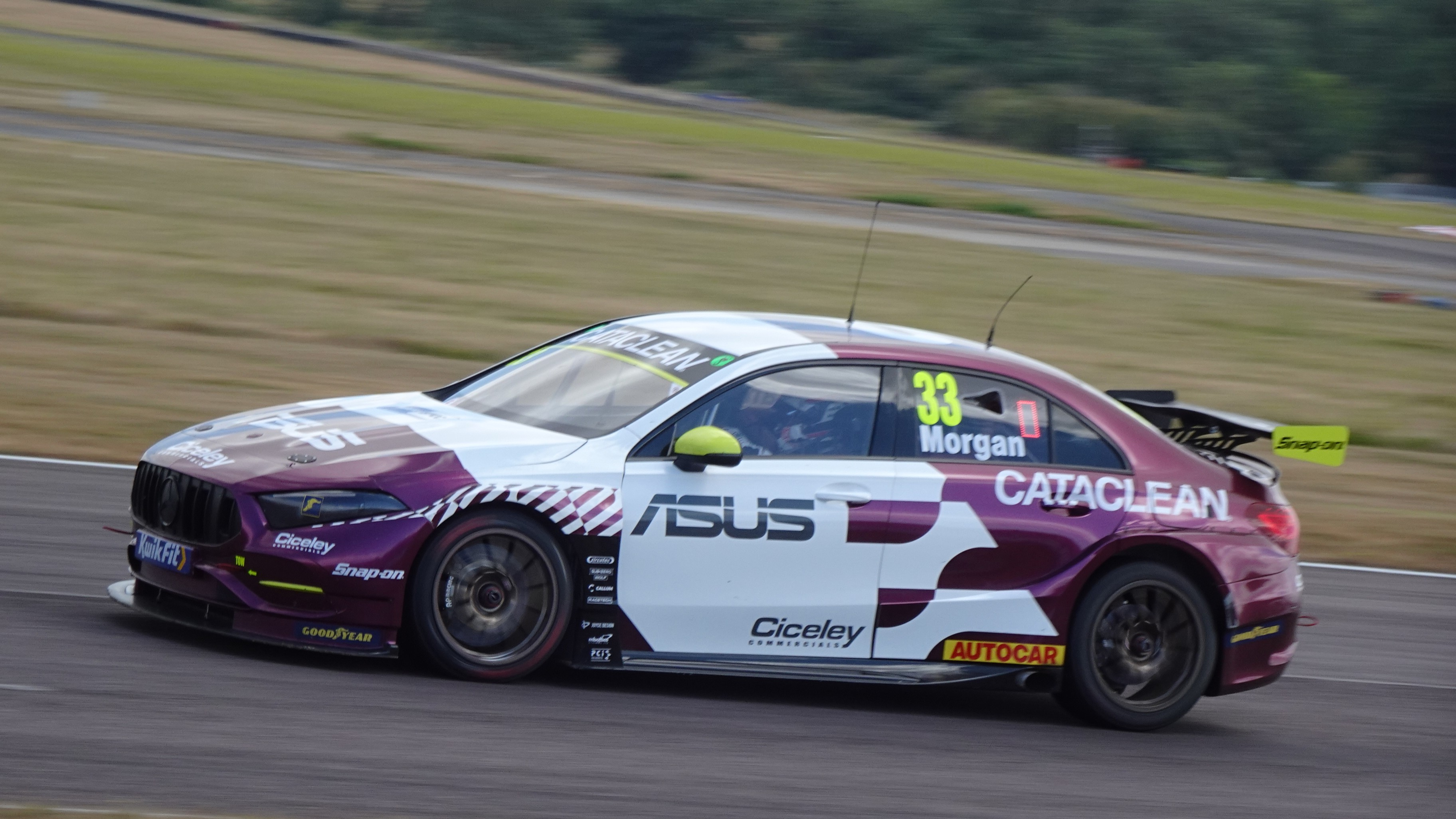
Adam Morgan driving for Plato's team at Thruxton Circuit in 2026

Plato served as team owner and team principal for the first six race weekends of the 2026 British Touring Car Championship.(18 races) Under his leadership, the team achieved its maiden pole position and maiden team victory, with the latter resulting in a 1–2 finish. At the time of Plato's departure, the team was third in the manufacturers' standings and fourth in the teams' standings.

On 11 August 2026, Plato Racing entered administration following a notice filed by title sponsor Cataclean Global. The subsequent restructuring resulted in Plato's departure from the team and ended his involvement with the operation. The team founded by Plato is now known as CPRL (Cataclean Plato Racing Limited) and will continue to race in the BTCC for the remainder of the 2026 season with Dave Kelly as the new team principal

== Racing record ==
=== Complete British Touring Car Championship results ===
(key) Races in bold indicate pole position (1 point awarded – 1997–2002 all races, 2003–present just in first race, 2000–2003 in class) Races in italics indicate fastest lap (1 point awarded – 2001–present all races, 2000–2003 in class) * signifies that driver lead race for at least one lap (1 point awarded – 1998–2002 just in feature races, 2003–present all races)

Year	Team	Car	Class	1	2	3	4	5	6	7	8	9	10	11	12	13	14	15	16	17	18	19	20	21	22	23	24	25	26	27	28	29	30	DC	Points
1997	Williams Renault Dealer Racing	Renault Laguna		**DON**; **1**; 2	**DON**; **2** Ret	**SIL**; **1**; 10	SIL; 2; 3	THR; 1 Ret	THR; 2; 7	BRH; 1; 3	BRH; 2; 5	OUL; 1; 2	OUL; 2; 4	DON; 1; 4	DON; 2 Ret	CRO; 1; 2	CRO; 2; 4	KNO; 1 Ret	KNO; 2; 5	SNE; 1; 4	SNE; 2; 1	THR; 1; 7	THR; 2; 6	BRH; 1; 2	BRH; 2 Ret	**SIL**; **1**; 3	SIL; 2; 1							3rd	170
1998	Blend 37 Williams Renault	Renault Laguna		THR; 1; 2	THR; 2; 4	SIL; 1; 3	**SIL**; **2**; 2*	DON; 1 Ret	DON; 2; 5	BRH; 1; 4	BRH; 2 Ret	OUL; 1; 4	OUL; 2; 1*	DON; 1; 9	DON; 2 Ret	CRO; 1; 8	CRO; 2; 6	SNE; 1; 2	SNE; 2; 3	THR; 1 Ret	THR; 2 Ret	KNO; 1 Ret	KNO; 2; 5	BRH; 1; 7	BRH; 2; 4*	OUL; 1; 6	OUL; 2; 2	SIL; 1; 4	SIL; 2; 6					5th	163
1999	Nescafé Blend 37 Williams Renault	Renault Laguna		DON; 1; 3	DON; 2; 3	SIL; 1; 6	SIL; 2; 1*	THR; 1 Ret	THR; 2; 4*	BRH; 1; 4	BRH; 2 Ret*	OUL; 1 Ret	OUL; 2 Ret	DON; 1; 3	DON; 2; 8	CRO; 1; 6	CRO; 2; 6	SNE; 1; 4	SNE; 2; 6	THR; 1; 5	THR; 2; 4	KNO; 1 Ret	KNO; 2 Ret	BRH; 1; 6	BRH; 2; 8	OUL; 1 Ret	OUL; 2; 6	SIL; 1 Ret	SIL; 2 Ret					5th	122
2000	Vauxhall Motorsport	Vauxhall Vectra	S	BRH; 1 ovr:4 cls:4	BRH; 2 ovr:1* cls:1	DON; 1 ovr:6 cls:6	DON; 2 ovr:7 cls:7	THR; 1 ovr:3 cls:3	**THR**; **2** ovr:2* cls:2	KNO; 1 ovr:8 cls:8	KNO; 2 ovr:8 cls:8	OUL; 1 ovr:7 cls:7	OUL; 2 ovr:2 cls:2	SIL; 1 Ret	SIL; 2 ovr:5 cls:5	CRO; 1 Ret	CRO; 2 Ret‡	**SNE**; **1** ovr:1 cls:1	SNE; 2 ovr:2 cls:2	DON; 1 ovr:5 cls:5	DON; 2 ovr:7 cls:7	BRH; 1 ovr:7 cls:7	BRH; 2 ovr:3* cls:3	OUL; 1 ovr:9 cls:9	OUL; 2 ovr:4 cls:4	SIL; 1 Ret	SIL; 2 ovr:2 cls:2							5th	160
2001	Vauxhall Motorsport	Vauxhall Astra Coupé	T	BRH; 1; 2†	BRH; 2 ovr:2* cls:2	**THR**; **1** ovr:1 cls:1	THR; 2 ovr:2* cls:2	OUL; 1 ovr:9 cls:3	OUL; 2 Ret*	SIL; 1 ovr:3 cls:1	SIL; 2 ovr:1* cls:1	MON; 1 ovr:17 cls:7	MON; 2 ovr:2* cls:2	DON; 1 ovr:2 cls:2	DON; 2 ovr:1* cls:1	**KNO**; **1** ovr:2 cls:1	**KNO**; **2** ovr:1* cls:1	**SNE**; **1** ovr:3 cls:2	**SNE**; **2** ovr:3* cls:3	CRO; 1 ovr:2 cls:1	CRO; 2 ovr:2 cls:2	OUL; 1 ovr:3 cls:3	OUL; 2 ovr:1* cls:1	SIL; 1 ovr:3 cls:3	SIL; 2 ovr:3* cls:3	**DON**; **1** ovr:5 cls:2	**DON**; **2** ovr:3* cls:3	BRH; 1 ovr:3 cls:2	BRH; 2 ovr:2 cls:2					1st	336
2004	SEAT Sport UK	SEAT Toledo Cupra		THR; 1; 8	THR; 2; 1*	**THR**; **3**; 4	BRH; 1 Ret	BRH; 2 DNS	BRH; 3 Ret	**SIL**; **1**; 3*	SIL; 2; 9	SIL; 3; 2	OUL; 1; 8	OUL; 2; 2	OUL; 3 Ret*	MON; 1; 9	MON; 2; 1*	**MON**; **3** Ret*	CRO; 1; 9	CRO; 2; 1*	**CRO**; **3**; 1*	KNO; 1; 10	**KNO**; **2**; 1*	**KNO**; **3**; 7*	BRH; 1; 9	BRH; 2; 1*	**BRH**; **3**; 2*	SNE; 1; 11	SNE; 2; 3	SNE; 3; 10	**DON**; **1**; 1*	DON; 2; 6	DON; 3; 2	3rd	224
2005	SEAT Sport UK	SEAT Toledo Cupra		DON; 1; 6	DON; 2; 5	DON; 3; 6*	THR; 1; 2*	THR; 2; 5	THR; 3; 5*	BRH; 1; 4	BRH; 2; 2	BRH; 3; 3	**OUL**; **1**; 1*	**OUL**; **2**; 10*	**OUL**; **3**; 3	CRO; 1; 4	CRO; 2; 13	CRO; 3; 3	MON; 1; 2	MON; 2; 10	**MON**; **3** Ret	SNE; 1 Ret	SNE; 2; 10	**SNE**; **3**; 1*	KNO; 1; 6	KNO; 2; 8	KNO; 3; 5	SIL; 1; 3	SIL; 2 DSQ	SIL; 3; 6	BRH; 1; 3	BRH; 2; 1*	BRH; 3 Ret	4th	208
2006	SEAT Sport UK	SEAT León		BRH; 1 Ret	BRH; 2; 5	BRH; 3; 1*	MON; 1; 2	MON; 2; 2	MON; 3; 8	**OUL**; **1**; 14*	OUL; 2; 6	OUL; 3; 1*	THR; 1 Ret	THR; 2 Ret	THR; 3; 3	CRO; 1; 1*	**CRO**; **2**; 2*	CRO; 3; 3	DON; 1; 7	DON; 2 Ret	DON; 3 Ret	**SNE**; **1**; 1*	**SNE**; **2**; 1*	SNE; 3; 6	**KNO**; **1**; 1*	**KNO**; **2** Ret*	KNO; 3 DNS	**BRH**; **1**; 1*	**BRH**; **2**; 1*	BRH; 3; 3	SIL; 1; 8	SIL; 2 Ret	SIL; 3; 4	2nd	241
2007	SEAT Sport UK	SEAT León		BRH; 1; 1*	**BRH**; **2**; 1*	BRH; 3; 4	ROC; 1; 3	ROC; 2; 5	ROC; 3; 1*	THR; 1; 2	THR; 2; 6	THR; 3; 1*	CRO; 1; 7	CRO; 2; 2*	CRO; 3; 8	OUL; 1; 7	OUL; 2; 5	OUL; 3; 2	DON; 1; 5	DON; 2; 1*	DON; 3; 1*	SNE; 1; 8	SNE; 2; 3	SNE; 3; 4	BRH; 1; 2	BRH; 2; 2	BRH; 3; 5	KNO; 1; 3	KNO; 2; 5	KNO; 3; 3	THR; 1; 2	THR; 2; 2	THR; 3; 4	2nd	297
2008	SEAT Sport UK	SEAT León TDI		BRH; 1; 3	BRH; 2; 3	BRH; 3; 5	ROC; 1; 9	ROC; 2; 9	ROC; 3; 6	DON; 1; 1*	**DON**; **2**; 2*	DON; 3; 3	THR; 1 DSQ	THR; 2; 7	THR; 3; 1*	CRO; 1; 12	CRO; 2; 8	CRO; 3; 12	**SNE**; **1**; 1*	**SNE**; **2**; 1*	SNE; 3 Ret	**OUL**; **1**; 1*	**OUL**; **2** NC*	OUL; 3; 9	KNO; 1; 1*	**KNO**; **2**; 1*	KNO; 3 Ret	**SIL**; **1**; 1*	**SIL**; **2**; 7*	SIL; 3; 5*	BRH; 1; 5	BRH; 2 Ret	BRH; 3; 13	3rd	223
2009	RML	Chevrolet Lacetti		BRH; 1; 6	BRH; 2; 10	**BRH**; **3**; 1*																												2nd	270
2009	Racing Silverline	Chevrolet Lacetti					THR; 1; 10	THR; 2; 6	THR; 3; 4	DON; 1; 7	DON; 2; 4	DON; 3; 3	**OUL**; **1**; 2	OUL; 2; 3	OUL; 3; 5	CRO; 1; 3	CRO; 2; 3	CRO; 3; 5	**SNE**; **1** Ret	SNE; 2; 3	SNE; 3; 13	**KNO**; **1**; 1*	**KNO**; **2** Ret	KNO; 3; 2	SIL; 1; 2	SIL; 2; 1*	SIL; 3; 7	**ROC**; **1**; 2	ROC; 2; 1*	ROC; 3; 12	BRH; 1; 1*	**BRH**; **2**; 1*	BRH; 3; 1*	2nd	270
2010	Silverline Chevrolet	Chevrolet Cruze		THR; 1; 2	THR; 2; 4	THR; 3; 3	ROC; 1; 3	ROC; 2; 1*	ROC; 3; 5	BRH; 1; 8	BRH; 2 Ret	BRH; 3 Ret	OUL; 1; 10	OUL; 2; 1*	OUL; 3; 6	CRO; 1; 3	CRO; 2; 3	CRO; 3; 16	SNE; 1; 1*	**SNE**; **2**; 1*	SNE; 3; 5	SIL; 1; 3	SIL; 2; 4	SIL; 3; 9	KNO; 1; 6	KNO; 2; 3	KNO; 3; 1*	DON; 1 Ret	DON; 2; 3	DON; 3; 3	**BRH**; **1**; 1*	**BRH**; **2**; 1*	BRH; 3; 9	1st	260
2011	Silverline Chevrolet	Chevrolet Cruze LT		BRH; 1; 1*	**BRH**; **2**; 1*	BRH; 3; 5	DON; 1; 18	DON; 2 Ret	DON; 3; 6	THR; 1 Ret	THR; 2; 8	THR; 3; 1*	OUL; 1; 2	OUL; 2; 1*	OUL; 3; 11	**CRO**; **1**; 4	CRO; 2 Ret	CRO; 3; 11	**SNE**; **1**; 1*	**SNE**; **2**; 3	SNE; 3; 3	KNO; 1; 7	KNO; 2; 7	**KNO**; **3** Ret*	**ROC**; **1**; 1*	**ROC**; **2**; 4*	ROC; 3; 5	**BRH**; **1**; 1*	**BRH**; **2**; 1*	BRH; 3; 6	SIL; 1 Ret	SIL; 2; 7	SIL; 3; 2	3rd	236
2012	MG KX Momentum Racing	MG 6 GT		BRH; 1; 4	BRH; 2; 3*	BRH; 3; 1*	**DON**; **1**; 4	DON; 2 NC	DON; 3; 2	THR; 1; 3	THR; 2; 2	THR; 3; 4	**OUL**; **1** NC	OUL; 2; 3	OUL; 3; 2	CRO; 1 NC	CRO; 2; 7	CRO; 3; 1*	SNE; 1; 1*	**SNE**; **2**; 3*	SNE; 3; 3	**KNO**; **1** Ret	KNO; 2; 11	KNO; 3 Ret	**ROC**; **1**; 1*	**ROC**; **2**; 3	ROC; 3; 3	**SIL**; **1**; 1*	**SIL**; **2** Ret*	SIL; 3; 1*	BRH; 1; 8	BRH; 2; 5	BRH; 3; 8	3rd	376
2013	MG KX Momentum Racing	MG 6 GT		BRH; 1; 1*	**BRH**; **2**; 1*	BRH; 3; 5	DON; 1; 4	DON; 2; 2	DON; 3; 8	THR; 1; 2	THR; 2; 5	THR; 3; 22*	**OUL**; **1**; 1*	**OUL**; **2**; 1*	OUL; 3 Ret	CRO; 1; 5	CRO; 2; 20*	CRO; 3; 6	SNE; 1; 2	SNE; 2 Ret*	SNE; 3 Ret	KNO; 1; 4	KNO; 2; 7	KNO; 3; 5	**ROC**; **1**; 5	ROC; 2; 6	ROC; 3; 3	**SIL**; **1**; 1*	**SIL**; **2**; 1*	SIL; 3; 7	**BRH**; **1**; 1*	**BRH**; **2**; 1*	BRH; 3; 10	3rd	380
2014	MG KX Clubcard Fuel Save	MG 6 GT		BRH; 1; 2	BRH; 2; 11	BRH; 3; 3	**DON**; **1**; 1*	**DON**; **2**; 2	DON; 3; 6	THR; 1; 6	THR; 2; 7	THR; 3 Ret	OUL; 1; 3	OUL; 2; 4	OUL; 3; 4	CRO; 1; 3	CRO; 2; 5	CRO; 3; 10	**SNE**; **1**; 1*	**SNE**; **2**; 1*	SNE; 3; 4	KNO; 1; 5	KNO; 2; 2	KNO; 3; 10	ROC; 1; 3	ROC; 2; 2	ROC; 3; 7	**SIL**; **1**; 1*	**SIL**; **2**; 1*	SIL; 3; 4	**BRH**; **1**; 1*	**BRH**; **2**; 13	BRH; 3; 7	2nd	401
2015	Team BMR RCIB Insurance	Volkswagen CC		BRH; 1; 3	**BRH**; **2** Ret*	BRH; 3; 16	DON; 1; 1*	DON; 2; 5	DON; 3; 8	THR; 1; 4	**THR**; **2**; 1*	THR; 3; 7	**OUL**; **1**; 1*	**OUL**; **2**; 1*	OUL; 3; 5	CRO; 1; 27	CRO; 2; 2	CRO; 3; 5	SNE; 1; 3	SNE; 2; 4	SNE; 3; 2	KNO; 1; 23	KNO; 2; 7	KNO; 3; 6	ROC; 1; 27	ROC; 2; 7	ROC; 3; 1*	SIL; 1; 25	SIL; 2; 7	SIL; 3; 4	BRH; 1; 5	BRH; 2; 6	BRH; 3; 1*	2nd	344
2016	Silverline Subaru BMR Racing	Subaru Levorg GT		BRH; 1; 21	BRH; 2; 13	BRH; 3; 16	DON; 1; 17	DON; 2; 20	DON; 3; 16	THR; 1 WD	THR; 2 WD	THR; 3 WD	OUL; 1; 3	OUL; 2; 3	OUL; 3; 3	CRO; 1; 2	CRO; 2; 2*	CRO; 3; 10	SNE; 1; 5	SNE; 2; 6	SNE; 3; 4*	**KNO**; **1**; 1*	**KNO**; **2**; 3*	KNO; 3; 3	ROC; 1; 3	ROC; 2 Ret	ROC; 3; 10	SIL; 1; 10	SIL; 2; 5	SIL; 3; 12	BRH; 1; 4	BRH; 2; 2	BRH; 3; 10	7th	256
2017	Adrian Flux Subaru Racing	Subaru Levorg GT		BRH; 1; 12	BRH; 2 Ret	BRH; 3 DNS	DON; 1 Ret	DON; 2; 20	DON; 3; 16	THR; 1; 23	THR; 2; 25	THR; 3; 28	OUL; 1; 12	OUL; 2; 11	OUL; 3; 11	CRO; 1; 10	CRO; 2; 6	CRO; 3; 3	SNE; 1; 5	SNE; 2; 24	SNE; 3; 16	**KNO**; **1**; 1*	**KNO**; **2**; 2*	KNO; 3; 6	ROC; 1; 10	ROC; 2; 4	ROC; 3; 3	SIL; 1; 23	SIL; 2; 15	SIL; 3 Ret	BRH; 1; 28	BRH; 2; 24	BRH; 3; 22	12th	146
2018	Adrian Flux Subaru Racing	Subaru Levorg GT		BRH; 1; 20	BRH; 2; 22	BRH; 3; 19	DON; 1; 25	DON; 2; 20	DON; 3; 18	THR; 1 Ret	THR; 2 Ret	THR; 3 DNS	OUL; 1; 30	OUL; 2; 20	OUL; 3 Ret	CRO; 1; 2	CRO; 2; 14	CRO; 3; 19	SNE; 1; 24	SNE; 2 Ret	SNE; 3; 15	ROC; 1; 23	ROC; 2; 26	ROC; 3; 11	KNO; 1; 26	KNO; 2 Ret	KNO; 3; 19	SIL; 1 Ret	SIL; 2; 17	SIL; 3; 18	BRH; 1; 18	BRH; 2; 17	BRH; 3; 25	27th	26
2019	Sterling Insurance with Power Maxed Racing	Vauxhall Astra		BRH; 1; 25	BRH; 2; 21	BRH; 3; 13	DON; 1; 9	DON; 2; 6	DON; 3; 7	THR; 1; 6	THR; 2; 4	THR; 3; 8	CRO; 1; 8	CRO; 2; 6	CRO; 3; 3	OUL; 1; 9	OUL; 2; 9	OUL; 3 Ret	SNE; 1; 6	SNE; 2; 6	SNE; 3; 17*	THR; 1; 17	THR; 2; 13	THR; 3; 5	KNO; 1; 12	KNO; 2; 8	KNO; 3; 8	**SIL**; **1**; 2*	SIL; 2; 4	SIL; 3; 6	BRH; 1; 14	BRH; 2; 7	BRH; 3; 1*	7th	237
2021	Adrian Flux with Power Maxed Racing	Vauxhall Astra		THR; 1; 6	THR; 2; 5	THR; 3; 2	SNE; 1; 17	SNE; 2; 20	SNE; 3; 18	BRH; 1; 13	BRH; 2; 8	BRH; 3; 4	OUL; 1; 7	OUL; 2; 18	OUL; 3; 13	KNO; 1; 14	KNO; 2; 8	KNO; 3; 9	THR; 1; 9	THR; 2; 9	THR; 3; 8	CRO; 1; 17	CRO; 2; 12	CRO; 3; 23	SIL; 1; 10	SIL; 2; 10	SIL; 3; 6	DON; 1; 6	DON; 2; 18	DON; 3; 15	BRH; 1; 19	BRH; 2; 18	BRH; 3; 10	14th	156
2022	Rich Energy BTC Racing	Honda Civic Type R		DON; 1; 20	DON; 2; 13	DON; 3; 12	BRH; 1; 17	BRH; 2; 13	BRH; 3 Ret	THR; 1; 6	THR; 2; 7	**THR**; **3**; 24	OUL; 1; 17	OUL; 2; 17	OUL; 3; 11	CRO; 1; 17	CRO; 2; 16	CRO; 3; 14	KNO; 1; 27	KNO; 2; 26	KNO; 3; 19	SNE; 1; 6	SNE; 2; 7	SNE; 3; 2	THR; 1; 14	THR; 2; 18	THR; 3 Ret	SIL; 1; 14	SIL; 2; 17	SIL; 3; 15	BRH; 1; 17	BRH; 2; 18	BRH; 3; 17	17th	77

† Event with 2 races staged for the different classes. ‡ Retired before 2nd start of race.

=== Complete World Touring Car Championship results ===
(key) (Races in bold indicate pole position) (Races in italics indicate fastest lap)

Year	Team	Car	1	2	3	4	5	6	7	8	9	10	11	12	13	14	15	16	17	18	19	20	DC	Points
2005	SEAT Sport	SEAT Toledo Cupra	ITA; 1	ITA; 2	FRA; 1	FRA; 2	GBR; 1; 8	**GBR**; **2**; 2	SMR; 1; 11	SMR; 2; 8	MEX; 1; 11	MEX; 2; 12	BEL; 1; 9	BEL; 2; 14	GER; 1	GER; 2	TUR; 1	TUR; 2	ESP; 1	ESP; 2	MAC; 1	MAC; 2	15th	10

=== Complete V8 Supercar Championship results ===
(key) (Races in bold indicate pole position) (Races in italics indicate fastest lap)

Year	Team	Car	1	2	3	4	5	6	7	8	9	10	11	12	13	Position	Points	Ref
2000	Holden Racing Team	Holden VT Commodore	PHI	PTH	ADL	ECK	HDV	CAN	QLD	WIN	OPK	CDR	QLD	SAN	BAT; 10	33rd	120	
2004	Holden Racing Team	Holden VY Commodore	ADL	ECK	PUK	HDV	PTH	QLD	WIN	OPK	SAN; 14	BAT; Ret	SUR	SYM	ECK	58th	140	

=== Complete Bathurst 1000 results ===
Year	Team	Car	Co-driver	Position	Laps	Ref
1997*	(United Kingdom) Williams Renault Dealer Racing	Renault Laguna	(Switzerland) Alain Menu	DNF	114	
2000	(Australia) Holden Racing Team	Holden Commodore VT	(France) Yvan Muller	10th	159	
2004	(Australia) Holden Racing Team	Holden Commodore VY	(Australia) Peter Brock	DNF	27	

* Super Touring race

Sporting positions
Preceded by Inaugural	Rencontres Internationales de Formule Renault champion 1991	Succeeded by Pedro de la Rosa
Preceded by N/A	British Renault Spider Champion; 1996	Succeeded by N/A
Preceded by Alain Menu	British Touring Car Champion; 2001	Succeeded by James Thompson
Preceded by Colin Turkington	British Touring Car Champion; 2010	Succeeded by Matt Neal
Preceded by Tom Kristensen; Petter Solberg	Race of Champions Nations' Cup; 2015; With: Andy Priaulx	Succeeded by Sebastian Vettel (2017)
Awards and achievements
Preceded by Mike Conway	Autosport; National Racing Driver of the Year; 2007	Succeeded by Oliver Turvey
Preceded by Colin Turkington	Autosport Awards; National Driver of the Year; 2010	Succeeded by Matt Neal
