= Top Gear America =

- Genre: Motoring
- Based on: Top Gear by Jeremy Clarkson; Andy Wilman
- Presented by: William Fichtner; Tom Ford; Antron Brown; The Stig; Dax Shepard; Jethro Bovingdon; Rob Corddry
- Country of origin: United States
- Original language: English
- No. of seasons: 3
- No. of episodes: 29

Production
- Executive producer: Sarah Barnett
- Running time: 60 minutes (2017); 31–35 minutes (2021–22)
- Production company: BBC Worldwide

Original release
- Network: BBC America (2017); MotorTrend+ (2021–22)
- Release: July 30, 2017 – August 26, 2022

Related
- Top Gear worldwide

Top Gear America is a motoring television series based on the British version. The program was announced in April 2017. The eight-episode first season premiered on BBC America on July 30, 2017, with William Fichtner, Tom Ford and Antron Brown as hosts.

On April 10, 2019, it was announced that a reboot of the series was in the works. On December 3, 2019, it was revealed that Dax Shepard, Rob Corddry, and Jethro Bovingdon would be the hosts of the revival, and premiered on MotorTrend+ in 2021. However, due to the COVID-19 pandemic, production was delayed and production finally wrapped in late 2020.

== Format ==
The format and segments of the show follows the original British version: studio segments, car reviews, celebrity guests, challenges, power laps and races. However, following the broadcast of the first episode, the show was criticised for its similarity to the UK version.

== Development ==
A previous American version of Top Gear was broadcast on History from November 2010 until June 2016. Following a second revamp of the British version in 2017, BBC America announced that Top Gear would return to the United States in late 2017 as a new show, now titled Top Gear America, to be hosted by actor William Fichtner. Later that month, it was confirmed that British journalist and television host Tom Ford and American drag racer Antron Brown would be Fichtner's co-hosts.

Network president, Sarah Barnett, commented, "We are big fans of the mix of cars, credibility and charisma that adds up to the winning formula for Top Gear, and couldn't be happier that BBCA is now the home for the franchise in the United States, with Top Gear America joining the original show on our network, Bill, Antron and Wookie are serious gear heads who never take themselves too seriously. It will be quite the trip."

Episodes of Top Gear America were broadcast on Sunday in the same time slot as the British version. Following a series of teaser trailers featuring The Stig being shipped to and exploring the United States., the first trailer for the show was released by BBC America on June 29, 2017. That same day, the logo for the first season was unveiled, which features the three hosts and The Stig.

Studio and timed celebrity track segments were filmed on location in Las Vegas at Speedvegas.

== Episodes ==
Season	Episodes	Originally released		
Season	Episodes	First released	Last released	Network
1	8	July 30, 2017	September 17, 2017	BBC America
2	11	January 29, 2021	June 4, 2021	MotorTrend+
3	10	July 1, 2022	August 26, 2022	MotorTrend+

=== Season 1 (2017) ===
No. overall	No. in series	Title	Original release date	U.S. viewers (millions)
1	1	"Made in America"	July 30, 2017	0.30
2	2	"Movie Magic"	August 6, 2017	0.24
3	3	"Life on the Go"	August 13, 2017	0.19
4	4	"Drive Your Life"	August 20, 2017	0.19
5	5	"Humble Beginnings"	August 27, 2017	N/A
6	6	"Outside the Box"	September 3, 2017	0.12
7	7	"The Best"	September 10, 2017	N/A
8	8	"Time Capsule"	September 17, 2017	N/A

=== Season 2 (2021) ===
No. overall	No. in season	Title	Original release date
9	1	"Supercars"	January 29, 2021
10	2	"Overlanding For 5K"	January 29, 2021
11	3	"Future Classics"	February 5, 2021
12	4	"Luxury SUVs"	February 12, 2021
13	5	"Hot Rods"	February 19, 2021
14	6	"Save Rally Racing"	February 26, 2021
15	7	"Build the TGA Track"	May 7, 2021
16	8	"Ultimate Drivers Car"	May 14, 2021
17	9	"Desert Toys"	May 21, 2021
18	10	"The Best Selling Pickup Truck"	May 28, 2021
19	11	"Poster Cars"	June 4, 2021

=== Season 3 (2022) ===
No. overall	No. in season	Title	Original release date
20	1	"Supercars in Montana"	July 1, 2022
21	2	"Electric Executives"	July 1, 2022
22	3	"Ghost Cars"	July 8, 2022
23	4	"Best Truck Ever"	July 15, 2022
24	5	"$500 Junkers"	July 22, 2022
25	6	"German Wagons"	July 29, 2022
26	7	"TGA Saves Jaguar"	August 5, 2022
27	8	"Military Heritage"	August 12, 2022
28	9	"Ballers on a Budget"	August 19, 2022
29	10	"Minivans"	August 26, 2022
