= Antron Brown =

American drag racer (born 1976)

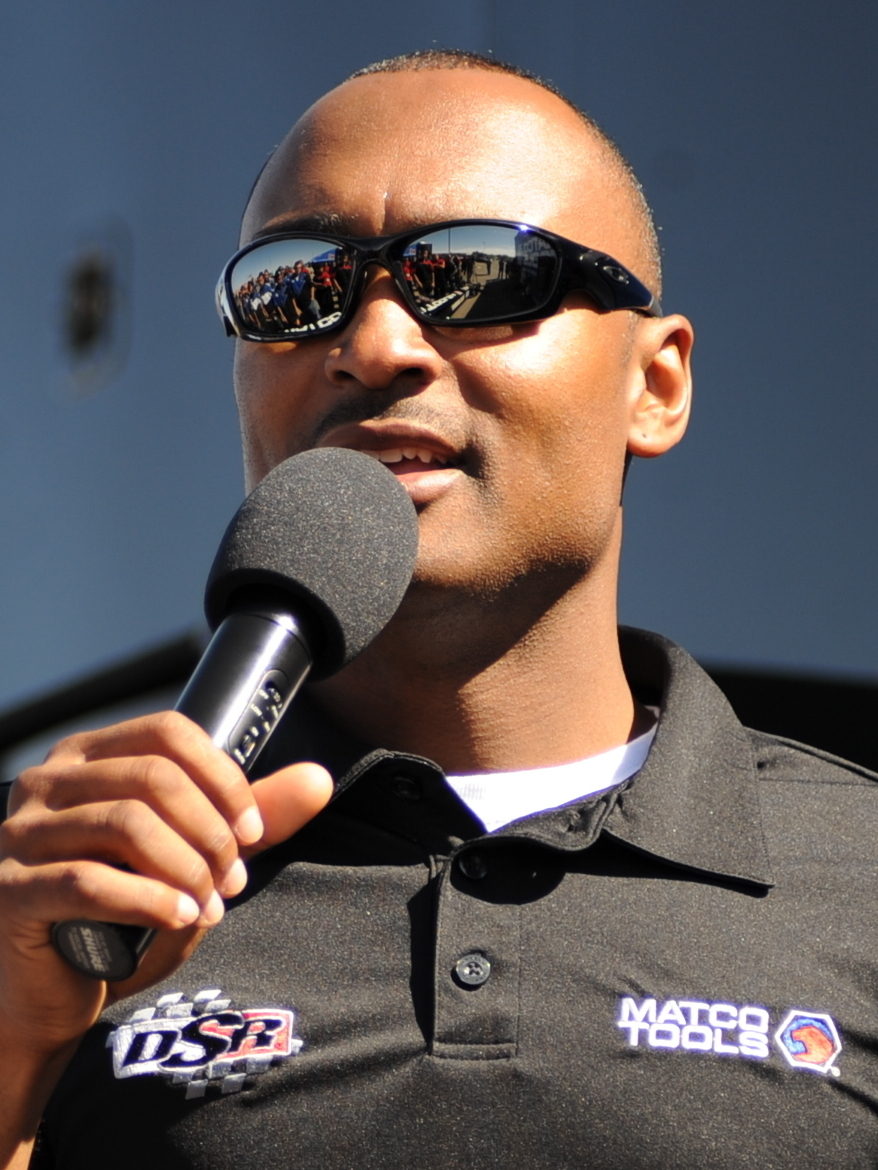
- Brown in 2013
- Nationality: American
- Born: March 1, 1976 (age 50) Trenton, New Jersey, U.S.

NHRA Mission Foods Drag Racing Series career
- Current team: AB Motorsports; Matco Tools Top Fuel Dragster
- Years active: 1998–present
- Crew chief: Brian Corradi
- Former teams: Team 23 Racing; David Powers Motorsports; Don Schumacher Racing
- Championships: 4 (TF)
- Wins: 81 (65 TF, 16 PSM)
- Fastest laps: Best ET; 3.655 seconds; Best Speed; 338.09 mph (544.10 km/h)

Championship titles
- 2012, 2015, 2016, 2024: NHRA Top Fuel Champion

Awards
- 1999: Auto Club Road to the Future Award
- Statistics up to date as of September 15, 2025.

Antron Brown (born March 1, 1976) is an American drag racing driver, currently driving the Matco Tools Top Fuel dragster for AB Motorsports in the NHRA Camping World Drag Racing Series. Brown is the first African American champion in drag racing and motorsports history, winning the Top Fuel dragster championship in 2012, 2015, 2016 and 2024.

== Early life ==
Brown lived in Trenton, New Jersey until age six, when his family moved to his grandmother's ten-acre farm in rural Chesterfield Township, New Jersey following the death of his grandfather. His father Albert ran a septic tank service, and was a drag racer at the sportsman level. Antron maintained the cars as a child and began racing motorcycles at age six and motocross at age 12, practicing on a course he built on the farm. He ran his first competitive drag race as a high school senior.

Brown studied at Northern Burlington County Regional High School before becoming a track star at Mercer County Community College in New Jersey as a sprinter and long jumper, graduating in 1997 with an associate's degree in business administration. After being offered a full scholarship to run track for Long Island University, he was contacted by football player Troy Vincent (married to Brown's cousin) who was starting a racing team.

== Racing career ==
Brown raced in the NHRA's Pro Stock Motorcycle division from 1998 to 2007, running his first three years with Vincent's Team 23 Racing. Brown won 16 events in the motorcycle division, and had a best finish of second in points in 2001 and 2006. In 2008, he switched to Top Fuel dragsters. Brown won the Top Fuel championship in 2012, 2015, 2016 and 2024. As of the end of the 2024 season, Brown has 80 NHRA wins.

== Personal life ==
Brown currently resides in Pittsboro, Indiana with his wife Billie Jo and three children, Anson, Adler, and Arianna. He is also an extremely devout Christian.

Notable: Ran quick enough in the 100-meter dash to qualify for the U.S. Olympic Trials in 1997.

== In popular culture ==
Brown had an appearance as an appraiser in episode 8 ("The Fast and The Curious") of the third season of the A&E reality show Storage Wars. He also appeared in episode 3 of Idris Elba: No Limits as Elba's drag racing instructor. He now co-hosts Top Gear America with Tom Ford and William Fichtner. Brown featured in the fifteenth season of Discovery's Wheeler Dealers, where he faced off against a 1965 Barracuda driven by Ant Antstead.

=== Crypto currency ===
On October 7, 2022, the NHRA Coin Antron Brown Edition NFT became available on the OpenSea NFT Marketplace.
