= Industrial Junkie =

British documentary television series

- Starring: Host: Jonny Smith
- Country of origin: United Kingdom
- No. of series: 1
- No. of episodes: 10

Production
- Running time: 30 minutes (with commercials)

Original release
- Network: Quest (United Kingdom)
- Release: 1 October – 3 December 2009

Industrial Junkie is a British documentary television series. The series premiered on 1 October 2009 on Quest in the United Kingdom. Each episode sees engineering enthusiast Jonny Smith experiencing the processes of a particular industry.

== Episodes ==
Season 1, Episode 1: Roads
Season 1, Episode 2: Rubber
Season 1, Episode 3: Explosives
Season 1, Episode 4: Coal
Season 1, Episode 5: Trucks
Season 1, Episode 6: Oil Rigs
Season 1, Episode 7: Glass
Season 1, Episode 8: Paint
Season 1, Episode 9: Packaging
Season 1, Episode 10: Steel

== See also ==
- Modern Marvels
- How It's Made
- How Do They Do It?
- Cool Stuff: How It Works
- HowStuffWorks
- Some Assembly Required
- How'd That Get On My Plate?
