= Rory Reid (journalist) =

British journalist

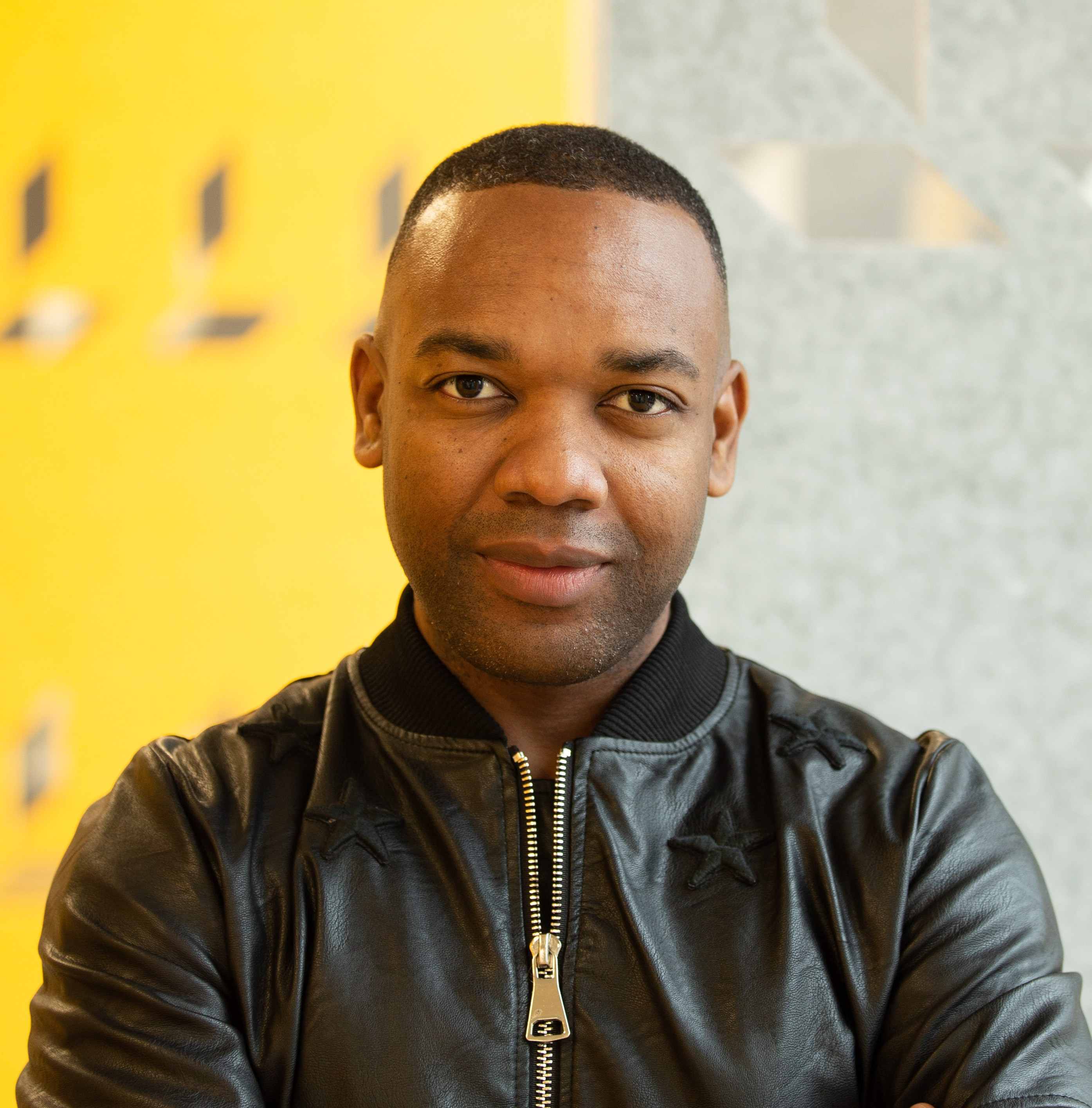
- Born: 12 October 1979 (age 46); South London, England
- Education: University of North London
- Occupations: Television presenter; journalist
- Presenting career
- Show: Fifth Gear Recharged
- Stations: Discovery+ and Quest
- Show: Auto Trader
- Station: YouTube
- Country: United Kingdom
- Previous shows: Top Gear, Extra Gear, Gadget Geeks and others
- Website: mrroryreid.com

Rory Reid (born 12 October 1979) is a British television presenter and journalist. He specialises in motoring and technology and currently works for Autotrader UK. He is best known for hosting Top Gear, Extra Gear, Gadget Geeks and several web series. Since 2019 he has served as Director of YouTube content at Auto Trader, where he also presents on the channel. Since 2021 he presents Fifth Gear Recharged on Discovery+ and Quest. He has been editor-in-chief for the website Recombu and has worked on BBC Radio 5 Live's Saturday Edition as a technology journalist.

== Early life ==
Rory Reid was born in 1979 in London, and grew up in the South London district of South Norwood. As a child he was fascinated by cars, and while his friends had posters of football players or Ninja Turtles on their bedroom walls, Reid "had every supercar poster on the wall". He began writing car reviews at a young age.

The first car he owned was a Ford Fiesta.

== Career ==
=== Journalism ===
Reid worked for the website CNET.com, where he was senior editor, and at Personal Computer World magazine. and as editor-in-chief for the Recombu, a review and comparison website covering cars, mobile phones, broadband and television, who he continues to work for as a brand ambassador.

Reid is a contributing editor to Top Gear magazine and has contributed to the BBC Online, The Telegraph, Bloomberg, CBS, Sky, and others.

=== Television and radio ===
Reid presented on Sky's Gadget Geeks in 2012, reviewing gadgets and technology, and worked on BBC Radio 5's Saturday Edition as a technology expert. He has also presented the ITV4 show, Speed Freaks, and is a regular contributor to BBC's The One Show.

==== Top Gear and Extra Gear ====
On 11 February 2016, during his Radio 2 breakfast show, Chris Evans announced that Reid will be one of the new presenters on Top Gear, joining Evans, Matt LeBlanc, The Stig, Sabine Schmitz, Chris Harris and Eddie Jordan. During his first series, Reid had a supporting role to the main presenters.

Reid was chosen by the show's producers after submitting a 30-second audition tape showcasing his skills as a presenter — and he was the only hopeful of the open audition to be picked, from more than 15,000 people who had applied. Evans said about Reid, “He's knowledgeable, funny cool and warm. That's not an easy combo. And he's a brilliant storyteller. His audition stuck out a mile.”

In an interview after his first series on the show aired, he described the experience as "pretty simple in terms of the job itself," but "the level of scrutiny that the show is under has just been absolutely immense." He also said joining the series had been "like being a soldier parachuted into a war" and the challenge of taking over from the previous presenters was "like the Wu-Tang Clan taking over from One Direction".

After that series, Evans resigned from the programme, with Reid and Harris joining LeBlanc as a trio of main hosts for the following three series. The Irish Times described Reid as "Top Gear's best 'find' since the Clarkson era", and "has an infectious schoolboy enthusiasm". He has also presented the ITV4 show, Speed Freaks.

In April 2016, it was announced that Reid would also present Top Gear's new sister show Extra Gear along with Harris. The pair presented the show for its first series, with comedian George Lewis joining them as a main presenter for the second series.

==== Speed Freaks and Fifth Gear Recharged ====
In 2021 Reid began hosting the newly renamed Fifth Gear Recharged on Discovery+ and Quest, along with Vicki Butler-Henderson, Jason Plato and Karun Chandhok. The show is a continuation of the original Fifth Gear series (which was created as a continuation of the original 1977 Top Gear series) but focuses purely on electric and hybrid drive vehicles.

=== Web ===
==== Auto Trader ====
In December 2019, Reid joined Auto Trader as Director of YouTube content. He serves as the main presenter on the channel, fronting car reviews, drag races and guides to help buyers choose a car. Reid said of his new role at the time, “Auto Trader has been a near-permanent fixture in my web browser for as long as I can remember, so having the opportunity to help others find their perfect car is a true career highlight.”

==== CNET and other channels ====
Reid launched and presented CNET's Car Tech channel, and was also the presenter on the YouTube channel Fast, Furious & Funny which features 'high octane car action', pranks and celebrity guests. He also fronted videos for Recombu, during one of which he damaged his knee by vaulting into a convertible. In a 2015 video for Recombu he performs a spoken word poetry review of a Rolls-Royce Ghost Series II, which was tweeted by Rolls-Royce and drew widespread positive attention.

In October 2020, Reid presented an episode of Fully Charged reviewing the Honda e electric car.

In January 2021 it was announced that Reid was to front an E-Sports series in a campaign with McLaren and British American Tobacco (BAT) in order to enable them to reach their customers "in new, exciting and engaging ways" to push the addictive nicotine pouch brand VELO. He appears in the series alongside other UK stars including Craig David.

== Filmography ==
Television
Year	Title	Role	Broadcaster	Notes
2012	Gadget Geeks	Himself	Sky TV	Presenter
2016–2019	Top Gear	Himself	BBC Two	Recurring Presenter (series 23); Co-Presenter (series 24-26)
2016–2019	Extra Gear	Himself	BBC Two	Presenter (series 1, 3–4); Co-Presenter (series 2)
2021-	Fifth Gear	Himself	Discovery+ and Quest	Presenter

Web
Title	Role	Website	Notes
Car Tech channel	Himself	CNET	Presenter of the section channel
Fast, Furious & Funny	Himself	YouTube	Presenter of the YouTube channel
Fully Charged	Himself	YouTube	Presenter
Auto Trader UK channel	Himself	YouTube	Presenter
