= Fifth Gear =

Television series

- Also known as: 5th Gear (2002–05); Fifth Gear Recharged (2021–2024)
- Genre: Motoring
- Directed by: Phil Hawkins
- Presented by: Tiff Needell; Vicki Butler-Henderson; Tim Shaw; Tom Ford; Adrian Simpson; Quentin Willson; Jason Plato; Jonny Smith; Jon Bentley; Rory Reid; Sid North; Grace Webb; Jimmy de Ville; Karun Chandhok
- Theme music composer: John F Calone
- Opening theme: "Prize Fight"
- Composer: David Lowe
- Country of origin: United Kingdom
- No. of series: 29
- No. of episodes: 271 (list of episodes)

Production
- Executive producer: Richard Pearson
- Producer: Jim McMullan
- Production locations: Ace Cafe (2006–08); Millbrook Proving Ground (2008–09); Various (2010–15)
- Editors: Mike Bloore; Mike Brown; Martin Dowell; James Hay; Steve Killick; Leigh Nicholls; Tony Quinsee-Jover; Peter Shannon
- Running time: 30 minutes (2002–05, 2010–11); 45 minutes (2005); 60 minutes (2006–09, 2012–15, 2018–)
- Production company: North One

Original release
- Network: Channel 5 (2002–11); Discovery (2012–14); History (2015); Quest (2018–2024)
- Release: 8 April 2002 – 17 October 2024

Fifth Gear is a British motoring television magazine series which has been broadcast since 2002. Originally shown on Channel 5 from 2002 to 2011 (and branded as 5th Gear until 2005), it began as a continuation of the original version of the BBC show Top Gear, which ran from 1977 until being cancelled in 2001. It moved to the Discovery Channel in 2012, then in 2015 to History; since 2018 it has been broadcast on Quest. The show is currently presented by Vicki Butler-Henderson and Jason Plato, with Rory Reid, Grace Webb and Jimmy de Ville featuring in some episodes. Its former presenters include Quentin Willson, Adrian Simpson, Jonny Smith, former racing driver Tiff Needell and Car SOS host Tim Shaw.

== History ==
Fifth Gear was first broadcast on 8 April 2002, featuring the same format and many of the same presenters, including Willson, Needell, Butler-Henderson and Simpson, as the BBC's Top Gear. Channel 5 originally wanted to carry on using the Top Gear name, but the BBC refused as it still operated the Top Gear magazine; the BBC relaunched Top Gear with a drastically revised format later in 2002, placing a strong focus on comedy and general entertainment. Fifth Gear has been referenced in Top Gear, such as when a barn fire damaged Top Gear property, host Jeremy Clarkson satirically claimed that Fifth Gear had "burned our furniture."

Needell announced Fifth Gear's cancellation on 24 May 2016. On 14 June 2018, Needell announced on his official Twitter account that he had been doing some filming work for a new series of Fifth Gear which aired in September 2018 on Quest, but by 2019 had left the show to join Lovecars.com and their ITV4 programme On the Road.

Following a 2021 relaunch, with an emphasis on electric cars, it was rebranded as Fifth Gear Recharged. Fifth Gear Recharged was presented by Vicki Butler-Henderson, Sid North, Karun Chandhok and Jason Plato with Grace Webb and engineer Jimmy de Ville also involved in reports.

In 2024, North One scrapped the all-EV format, with the programme reverting to being Fifth Gear and with Rory Reid rejoining the presenting line-up.

Repeats of Fifth Gear also started being broadcast on UKTV channel Dave in April 2008 and later on Discovery Turbo, with early episodes of the show being streamed '24/7' via the British feed of Pluto TV in 2019.

== Format ==
The first seven series consisted of a 23-minute programme, not including approximately seven minutes of adverts. The eighth series returned in the autumn of 2005 in a longer format of 45 minutes, and the ninth series (which went to a 13-week run) was increased to a one-hour airtime slot (approximately 46 minutes excluding adverts). For series 17, the show had reverted to the original format of 23 minutes, which including adverts takes the show to half an hour. In Series 21, the show reverted to the previous one-hour airtime slot.

=== Locations ===
At the start of series 10, the show introduced between-feature links filmed at the Ace Cafe in London. In previous series, these links were filmed at the production company offices in Birmingham. Originally produced by Chrysalis Television, the Birmingham offices were situated on the top floor of the headquarters of 100.7 Heart FM (also, at that time, a Chrysalis Radio company), near Birmingham's Five Ways area. The team moved out when Chrysalis sold its television division to All3Media in September 2003 (the section which later produced Fifth Gear is now known as North One Television, part of the All3Media group).

In series 14, a location change from the Ace Cafe meant link sequences were filmed instead at the Millbrook Proving Ground, along with some of the vehicle testing features.

=== Presenter line-up ===
- Vicki Butler-Henderson (2002–2016, 2018–present)
- Jason Plato (2004–2014, 2018–present)
- Rory Reid (2021–2022, 2024)
- Grace Webb (2021–present)
- Jimmy de Ville (2019–present)

=== Former presenters ===
- Tiff Needell (2002–2016, 2018)
- Tom Ford (2002–2009)
- Adrian Simpson (2002–2006)
- Quentin Willson (2002–2004)
- Jonny Smith (2006–2016, 2018–2019)
- Karun Chandhok (2021–2024, previously seen on the programme as a guest)
- Sid North (2023)

=== Short-lived stints ===
In 2005, the show's producer, Jon Bentley, also became a part-time presenter for a year before he went back to being solely the producer. Tim Lovejoy was hired in September 2006 for series 9 and 10. In August 2008, Tim Shaw became a presenter on the show for series 14. In October 2010, Ben Collins, formerly The Stig on BBC's Top Gear, came to Fifth Gear for series 18. Sid North, joined the presenting line-up for the all-electric Fifth Gear Recharged format in 2023, but was replaced by a returning Rory Reid in 2024.

=== Shoot-outs ===
Fifth Gear claimed to be 'world renowned' for its 'infamous' shoot-outs, between similarly priced, similarly powerful cars, or, recently, cars versus bikes. These shoot outs took place at the Anglesey Circuit on the Isle of Anglesey close to Aberffraw. During the refurbishment of Anglesey, shoot-outs were switched to Castle Combe Circuit.

==== 2002 (Series 1 and 2) ====
- Ford Focus RS vs. Honda Civic Type-R vs. Seat León Cupra R

==== 2003 (Series 3 and 4) ====
- BMW Z4 (E85) 3.0i vs. Porsche Boxster
- Radical SR3 vs. Ariel Atom
- Nissan 350Z vs. Audi TT 3.2 Quattro
- BMW M3 CSL vs. BMW M3

==== 2004 (Series 5 and 6) ====
- Citroën C2 GT vs. Ford SportKa
- Ford Transit 125 T280 vs. Mercedes-Benz Sprinter 213CDI
- Škoda Fabia vRS TDi vs. Mini Cooper
- Lotus Elise 111R vs. Vauxhall VX220 Turbo

==== 2005 (Series 7 and 8) ====
- Ducati 999 vs. Lamborghini Gallardo
- Honda Civic Type-R vs. Renaultsport Clio 182 Cup
- Vauxhall Monaro VXR vs. MG ZT260
- MINI Cooper S Convertible vs. Smart Brabus Roadster Coupe
- Mosler MT900S vs. Ducati 999
- Mercedes-Benz SL55 AMG vs. Mercedes-Benz SLK55 AMG
- BMW X5 4.8is vs. Porsche Cayenne S
- Noble M400 vs. Mitsubishi Lancer Evolution VIII MR FQ-400
- Porsche 911 Carrera S vs. Lotus Exige 240R
- Mitsubishi Lancer Evolution VI GSR vs. Mitsubishi Lancer Evolution IX FQ-320
- Westfield XTR4 vs. Suzuki GSXR1000
- Ford Fiesta ST150 vs. Mitsubishi Colt CZT
- Mazda RX-8 vs. Alfa Romeo GT 3.2 V6
- Nissan 350Z vs. Audi TT Sport Quattro 240
- Mercedes-Benz CLS55 AMG vs. Jaguar XJR
- Subaru Legacy 3.0 R spec. B Sports Tourer vs. Volvo V50 T5 SE AWD
- Lancia Delta Integrale vs. BMW M3 e30.

==== 2006 (Series 9 and 10) ====
- 2006 Mazda MX-5 vs. Mazda MX-5 MkI
- Subaru Impreza WRX STi Type-UK vs. Subaru Forester STi
- Vauxhall Astra VXR vs. Ford Focus ST
- Mercedes-Benz A200T vs. Toyota Corolla Verso T180
- BMW M6 vs. BMW M5
- Škoda Octavia vRS vs. Volkswagen Golf GTI
- Volkswagen Golf R32 vs. BMW 130i M Sport
- Nissan Navara vs. Mitsubishi L200
- Mitsubishi Lancer Evolution IX MR FQ-360 vs. Stunt Plane

==== 2007 (Series 11 and 12) ====
- Renaultsport Clio 197 vs. Vauxhall Corsa VXR
- Mini Cooper vs. Suzuki Swift Sport
- White van Megane shoot-out: Renaultsport Megane 230 F1 Team R26 vs. Ford Transit Connect X-press
- Hire car shoot-out: Vauxhall Astra 1.6 vs. Ford Focus 1.6 Zetec
- BMW 335i vs. Audi S5
- Honda Civic Type R (UK 198 bhp (148 kW) specification) vs. Honda Civic Type R (Japanese 222 bhp (166 kW) specification)
- Audi TT 2.0T S-tronic vs. Audi TT 2.0T manual
- Ford Gran Torino vs. Dodge Charger

==== 2008 (Series 13) ====
- Week 1: Lotus Exige S 240 vs. Caterham CSR 260 Superlight
- Week 2: Renaultsport Clio 197 vs. Rage Buggy R180RT
- Week 3: Vauxhall VXR8 vs. Lotus Carlton
- Week 4: VW Transporter Sportline vs. Mercedes-Benz Vito X
- Week 5: Fiat Panda 100HP vs. Renault Twingo GT
- Week 6: Mini One vs. Fiat 500 1.4
- Week 7: Ford Fiesta ST vs. Vauxhall Corsa SRi
- Week 8: Porsche Cayenne GTS vs. BMW X5 4.8i
- Week 9: Volkswagen GTI vs. Subaru Impreza WRX
- Week 10: Ford Escort RS Cosworth vs. Ford Focus RS

==== 2009 (Series 14) ====
- Week 1:Mitsubishi Evo X FQ300 vs Subaru Impreza WRX STi
- Week 2: Mazda RX-8 vs Nissan 350Z
- Week 3: Volkswagen Passat R36 vs Audi A4 3.0 TDI
- Week 4: Honda Civic Mugen RR vs Honda S2000
- Week 5: Vauxhall Astra Nurburgring vs Ford Focus ST
- Week 7: MCW Metrobus vs MCW Metrobus

==== 2010 (Series 17) ====
- Week 1: Ford Focus RS vs Renault Mégane Renault Sport vs VW Scirocco R
- Week 3: Citroën DS3 DSport vs. Alfa Romeo MiTo Cloverleaf
- Week 4: Nissan 370Z Roadster vs. BMW Z4
- Week 6: Mercedes-Benz E63 AMG (525 hp) vs. Audi RS6
- Week 8: Peugeot RCZ vs. Volkswagen Scirocco
- Week 9: Volkswagen Golf R vs. SEAT León Cupra R

==== 2010 (Series 18) ====
- Week 1: BMW M3 Competition Pack vs. Mercedes-Benz C63 AMG Development Pack
- Week 2: Porsche Cayman vs. Lotus Evora
- Week 4: BMW 320d vs. Alpina D3 BiTurbo
- Week 6: Audi S4 vs. Vauxhall Insignia VXR
- Week 9: Honda CR-Z vs. Citroen DS3 HDi

==== 2011 (Series 19) ====
- Week 1: BMW 535d M Sport vs. Jaguar XF diesel S
- Week 2: Aston Martin Virage, BMW M3 GTS, Citroen DS3. Tiff tries to break a record in a 911. Jason reviews a Saab 9–5.
- Week 3: Ferrari FF, BMW 535D M-Sport, Jaguar XF, Nissan Micra. Jason goes drag racing in Abu Dhabi.
- Week 4: Nissan GT-R vs. Porsche 911 Turbo S
- Week 5: Porsche 911 Carrera vs. Lotus Evora S
- Week 6: Mercedes-Benz SLS AMG, Aston Martin V8 Vantage S, Lexus CT200h. Tiff and Jason race in hovercraft.
- Week 7: BMW 1 M, Ford Focus Titanium, Jaguar E-Type, Allard J2X
- Week 8: McLaren MP4-12C vs. Ferrari 458 Italia
- Week 9: Lamborghini Gallardo Performante, Volkswagen Phaeton, Porsche Cayman R, Smart Roadster, Audi A2 TDi, Honda Insight. Jonny shows us 3 of the cheapest to run cars in existence.
- Week 10: BMW M3 GTS, Porsche 911 GT3 RS, Piaggo MP3 Yourban (three wheeled scooter). Highlights from the last 10 years.

==== 2011 (Series 20) ====
- Week 1: The presenters conduct a 120 mph (190 km/h) crash test. They also compare two of the most powerful Jaguars ever made. They also take a look at the Range Rover Evoque.
- Week 2: Tiff chats to British rally driver Mark Higgins. The presenters take a look at a new Mercedes convertible. Vicki races a new Ford Mustang around Le Mans. Jonny begins a journey of a lifetime in a very unlikely car.
- Week 3: Tiff test drives the Lamborghini's new Aventador hypercar. Vicki makes her way through Italy's snowy mountain roads in Mini's brand new coupe. Jonny finds out about vehicle wrapping.
- Week 4: Vicki makes her way to Italy to drive a new convertible version of the Ferrari 458. Tiff takes part in a shootout between two ultra-powerful coupes. The team test drive the most economical car available.
- Week 5: Tiff takes a look at the last ever Porsche 911. Vicki travels to Portugal where she takes on the role of a beach lifeguard in a brand new VW pick-up truck. Jonny attempts to make Renault's battery powered car go as far as possible on one charge.
- Week 6: Jonny finds the best driving road in the world. Vicki takes the new VW Amarok pick-up for a test drive on a beach in Portugal. The driving skills of Roy Keane are tested by Tiff at the Nürburgring. The presenters take a look at the new Volkswagen Golf Cabriolet.
- Week 7: Tiff takes a drive through France's Champagne region in Aston Martin's newest convertible. Vicki is the umpire in a race between two England cricket stars. Jonny takes a look at two off-road bargains to help see us through the winter.
- Week 8: The presenters get the chance to drive the latest version of the Jeep. Cricket legend Jimmy Anderson is put through his paces around the gruelling Nürburgring race track by Tiff.
- Week 9: Vicki drives through the Pyrenees in the new BMW M5. Jonny travels to Barcelona to take a look at the Seat's new city car. Tiff is joined by rally driver Mark Higgins to test drive Renault's new hatchback.
- Week 10: Jonny takes a look at some exciting cars at the LA Auto Show. Ian Botham is taught how to drive around the legendary Nürburgring racing track. Vicki learns some evasive driving techniques from the police who chauffeur the Royal Family.

==== 2012 (Series 21) ====
- Week 1: Tiff tests the Porsche 911 Carrera S. Jonny Smith gets a high-speed truck rally driving lesson and the team also test a Volkswagen Beetle. Jason invites Suzi Perry to test, if you tweak ECU, change tyres etc. have better time. Vicki is on a mission to refill during driving.
- Week 2: Jason and Tiff test Mercedes SLS AMG against an Aston Martin, a Jaguar and a Bentley. Johnny goes to Sweden to drive new Audi A1 quattro with Stig Blomqvist.
- Week 3: Vicki tests the dynamic performance management system in the Lotus Exige S against ex-Lotus F1 driver Karun Chandhok. Tiff conducts an investigation into the advantages of electronic stability control (ESC) and Jonny Smith recommends some used cars with ESC fitted as standard. Team test of the Suzuki Swift Sport. Jonny tests sat-navs at three price levels. Vicki attends the Monaco Motor Show and drives the Fisker Karma on the Grand Prix track as well as a Hunton XRS 43 powerboat.
- Week 4: Tiff takes to the Italian F1 circuit in the hope of qualifying for the Lamborghini Series, and the team reports whether different types of petrol affect a car's performance.
- Week 5: Team test: Mini Cooper convertible. Tiff tries drifting with new Bentley Continental GT. Vicki goes to Gordon Murray's home to see his history of designing and presents his first electric car, the T27. Jason goes to Iceland to drive formula off-road with 2009 champion Hafsteinn Thorvaldsson. Jonny learns how to wash a Rolls-Royce Ghost EWB.
- Week 6: Tiff celebrates the Ferrari F40's 25th birthday, Jason pits the Mercedes C63 AMG Black Series against its BMW rival and Vicki drives a new Land Rover.
- Week 7: Jonny takes a behind-the-scenes look at the Isle of Man TT motorcycle race with John McGuinness, and the Subaru BRZ sports car is tested around the circuit. Tiff searches for his top three car racing games, Vicki tests the Renault Twizy, and the team test the Ford Focus Ecoboost 1.0 to see if it's more powerful than the 1.6 version.
- Week 8: Jonny examines the new Ferrari California, while Vicki explores the world of motorbike speedway in Denmark.
- Week 9: Jonny heads to Sweden for an American car show, Tiff tests the KTM X-Bow R trackday car, Jason explores affordable ways to upgrade a car stereo for better sound, and Vicki relives her karting memories with a race.

==== 2013 (Series 22) ====
- Week 1: Vicki in the new Porsche Boxster S against a jet plane, Tiff tests the difference between used and new tyres. Jonny goes to Trollstigen to test Ford Focus ST. Jason tests Audi S8.
- Week 2: Jason tests the brand new Pagani Huayra, Tiff tests the new Porsche 911 cabriolet to find out if it's quicker than the Audi R8 Spyder. Vicki tests a super car off roader. Johny reveals the three classic cars that could be a better investment than gold.
- Week 3: Vicki in the brand new Porsche Panamera GTS against the all-new Mercedes CLS 63, both cars are tested to the limit. Jason tests a brand new supercar made in the Netherlands. Johny spends a night in the Swiss alps to demonstrate how your car can keep you alive. Tiff tests the Frontline MG LE50.
- Week 4: Tiff and rally driver Kris Meeke find the ultimate hot hatch (VW Golf GTI vs Renault Sport Megane vs Ford Focus ST vs Astra VXR), Vicki is in Germany to test the Audi RS 4, Jonny finds out how the world's most powerful simulator has become F1's secret weapon. Jason reveals the ultimate secondhand sports car you can buy on a budget.
- Week 5: Jonny jumps into the world of professional drifting, the team test the Audi S7 to the extreme, Vicki takes part in a world record attempt: the largest parade of Ferraris, Tiff tests filling tyres with nitrogen and Jason tests the new Mercedes SL.
- Week 6: Vicki races rally driver Andreas Mikkelsen in three speed challenges, Jason tests the new BMW M6, Tiff finds out what the ultimate small car is and Jonny shows the essential DIY skills that will allow you to save money.
- Week 7: Vicki tests the new Ferrari F12 Berlinetta, Jonny attempts to become the fastest drag race passenger, Tiff and Jason race each other in a dog fight find to find out which of the latest entry level hot hatches is the greatest, and the team test the latest car safety systems.
- Week 8: Vicki visits Pininfarina headquarters in Italy and tests the Maserati GranTurismo MC Stradale, Jonny tests the modern-day Morgan three-wheeler, while Jason looks for the best Bluetooth gadget to use while driving together with Suzi Perry.
- Week 9: Tiff takes on Sabine Schmitz in a battle between the Porsche 911 and the BMW M6, Jason tests the new Morgan Plus 8, Vicki goes off-road with the latest version of the Range Rover Evoque and Jonny is in the lab to test fuel saving gadgets.

==== 2013 (Series 23) ====
- Week 1: Tiff and Jason test the Mercedes-Benz SL63 AMG, the Audi R8 V10 Spyder and the Maserati GranCabrio to the limit to find out which is the best super cabrio on the market, the team test the new Range Rover Autobiography, Vicki races the BMW M135i against world super bike rider Chaz Davies on the BMW HP4 and Jonny drives 1000 km in Europe's cheapest car, the Dacia Sandero.
- Week 2: Vicki and Tiff go head to head with the Renault Sport Megane 265 vs the Toyota GT86. Jason turns car doctor for the day as he tries to bring a tired engine back to full health. Jonny tests the Jaguar F-Type in Spain. The team test the Mazda6.
- Week 3: Tiff tests the McLaren 12C Spider, Jonny investigates the secret world of crash testing, the team test the brand new Volkswagen Golf, Jason and Finnish double world champion rally driver Marcus Grönholm pitch two brand new Porsche Caymans head-to-head in an automatic vs manual gearbox battle.
- Week 4: Tiff is in Los Angeles to reveal the latest petrol head craze: "Restomodding" and tests Magnus Walker's 1972 Porsche 911 STR, an Icon Toyota Land Cruiser FJ, and a Singer Porsche 911, Jason tests the new Aston Martin Vanquish with Brazilian racing driver Bruno Senna, Vicki tests the latest safety gadgets: dashboard cameras and the team test the brand new Mercedes-Benz A-Class.
- Week 5: Jason and Tiff test three brand new hot hatches: the Renault Sport Clio 200, the Peugeot 208 GTi and the Ford Fiesta ST, Vicki tests the new Donkervoort D8 GTO, the team test the brand new Jaguar XF Sportbreak, Jonny is at Bentley's HQ and tests the Bentley Mulsanne.
- Week 6: Tiff and Sabine Schmitz test the Caterham 7 Supersport R, the Morgan three-wheeler and the Ariel Atom 3.5. Jason tests the Mercedes-Benz G63 AMG, Vicki competes in a track day with a Peugeot 205 GTi and the team test the new Hyundai Veloster Turbo.

=== Team Test ===
In Series 19, a new segment was introduced, called the Team Test. This is where Tiff, Jason, Jonny and Vicki all did a group test on an important new car. They all scored the car out of 10, and added their scores together to get the score for the car.

== Show history ==
=== 2009 cancellation and return ===
Channel 5 executives had been quoted as saying, "Five is proud of Fifth Gear's contribution to the channel but after 16 series, feels it's time to try something new." On 27 November 2009, Jeremy Clarkson mentioned on The Chris Moyles Show that it was a shame that Fifth Gear had been cancelled.

In late December 2009, however, presenter Jonny Smith suggested via Twitter that the show could return for another series early in 2010. On 8 January 2010, Smith tweeted: "Fifth Gear IS coming back!", and in his next tweet, he said "Wow, such quick responses! Basically, we all know there's room for two car TV shows. FG will simply be a reviews based visual car magazine." Tiff Needell also tweeted saying "Home to the news that, after much negotiating Fifth Gear looks like it will after all be returning to your screens sometime in the Spring!" and also hinted the show will have a new format in his next tweet "Glad so many of you are delighted by the Fifth Gear news — and, yes the format will be moving away from the stupid ... but still having fun!"

On 17 January 2010, Vicki Butler-Henderson and Tiff Needell confirmed at the Autosport International Show that Fifth Gear will be returning in Spring 2010. The pair featured a car shootout in Fifth Gear style in the live arena show and said several times to the audience that the show would be back on air in Spring and to ignore the cancellation rumours.

The series started on 3 June 2010. The series ran for 10 episodes and the first one had Lewis Hamilton as a guest. On 1 October 2010, it was announced that Ben Collins (who played the original White Stig on Top Gear) would join the show.

=== Second cancellation and return ===
On 14 May 2016, Tiff Needell announced the cancellation of Fifth Gear following its last episode repeat airing on ITV4. Following a three-year hiatus, Needell announced the show's return on 14 June 2018, having started filming for a new series to be aired in September 2018 on the Discovery-operated Quest TV channel.

Fifth Gear is now being broadcast in the United States on the MotorTrend channel. Season 27 started on February 15 (episode 2, but episodes 1 and 3 are scheduled on Feb. 22nd).

=== Fifth Gear Recharged ===
In 2021, the show was relaunched as an electric car show under the amended title of Fifth Gear Recharged. Former Top Gear presenter Rory Reid, joined the presenting team of Vicky Butler Henderson, Jason Plato and Karun Chandhok (with the former Formula One driver and Sky F1 pundit now being part of the core presenting team and not a guest), while consumer journalist Grace Webb and engineer Jimmy de Ville will contribute to the show in guest roles (Jonny Smith has left the series to present The Late Brake Show webshow). As well as testing purely electric cars such as the Cupra Born, Hyundai Ioniq 5, Polestar 2 and ATAE Munro Mark 1, the show will also feature hybrids such as the Peugeot 508 PSE.

== The Fifth Gear Awards ==
Each year for a few series, the programme gives out various Car of the Year type awards:

=== 2004 ===
- Best small car – BMW 1 series
- Best family car – Ford Focus
- Best fast car – Porsche 911 Carrera S
- Car of the year – Volkswagen Golf GTI

=== 2005 ===
- Best small car – Ford Fiesta ST
- Best family car – Honda Civic
- Best fast car – BMW M5
- Car of the year – Porsche Boxster

=== 2006 ===
- Best small car – Mini Cooper S
- Best family car – Ford S-Max
- Best fast car – Chevrolet Corvette Z06
- Car of the year – Audi TT

=== 2007 ===
- Best small car – Fiat 500
- Best family car – Ford Mondeo
- Best fast car – Audi R8
- Car of the year – Audi R8

== Accidents ==
During recording for Series 12, Episode 7, two accidents took place while on set.

- On 27 September 2007, Tom Ford broke his foot and several toes when he crashed a modified Bedford Rascal van. Tom Ford was recording a piece about drifting. He and co-host Jonny Smith were racing each other in a D1 Grand Prix style around a private track. After winning the event, Ford was performing a victory drift that went wrong, put his van (painted to resemble the A-Team GMC Van) up on two wheels and into a safety barrier.
- On 9 October 2007, BTCC driver Jason Plato suffered multiple burns when a Caparo T1 he was driving at Bruntingthorpe proving ground burst into flames. The car, capable of 200 mph (320 km/h), burst into flames at an estimated 150 mph (240 km/h). Plato said: "There was a slight loss of power, I looked in the mirror and saw some smoke, there was a slight smell of oil and then suddenly there was this intense heat. The car spontaneously erupted into a ball of flames and I was sat in the middle of a fireball." The presenter was initially taken to Market Harborough and District Hospital by former BTCC driver Phil Bennett before being treated at Kettering General Hospital. He later received specialist burns treatment at Stoke Mandeville Hospital. The incident was mentioned during Top Gear's discussion of the Caparo T1 the next year.

Both accidents were shown on the episode.

== International airings ==
Fifth Gear has been broadcast on the Speed Channel in the United States for a short period in 2004 to early 2007. It began airing on Velocity on Wednesdays after Wheeler Dealers as of 3 October 2012.

Fifth Gear began broadcasting in Australia in November 2009, on Seven Network's free-to-air digital channel 7mate (previously shown on 7two).

Fifth Gear started Canadian broadcast on Discovery Channel Canada in 2008, beginning with 2006 series. This version ran in half-hour format.

Fifth Gear was also telecasted in Asia-Pacific in Discovery Turbo. It aired the 60 minute version.

== See also ==
- Top Gear (1977 TV series)
- Top Gear (2002 TV series)
