= Jonny Smith (journalist) =

Automotive journalist

- Born: 24 February 1979 (age 47); Taunton, Somerset, UK
- Occupations: Journalist; television presenter
- Television: Fifth Gear

YouTube information
- Channel: The Late Brake Show
- Subscribers: 784 thousand
- Views: 177 million
- Last updated: March 2026
- Website: thelatebrakeshow.com

Jonathan Charles Smith (born 24 February 1979) is a British motoring journalist and television presenter. He was one of the presenters on Channel 5 motoring programme Fifth Gear and has since presented Mud, Sweat & Gears for BBC America and Motorheads for BBC Worldwide.

== Career ==
Smith first worked for a custom and vintage VW magazine, becoming the editor after three years. He went on to work for magazine publisher EMAP, where he wrote features for magazines such as Max Power, Car magazine, Revs and Classic Cars.

Smith appeared on Sky One's Movies' Greatest Cars in 2005, where he was noticed by North One Television, producers of Fifth Gear, and subsequently asked to attend a screen test. Smith hosted his own engineering-based documentary television series, Industrial Junkie. In March 2014, he began filming a series with Tom Ford called Mud, Sweat & Gears: this was broadcast on BBC America during February and March 2015.

Smith was a presenter of the web TV and podcast show Fully Charged until January 2020. He now creates videos for his YouTube channel, The Late Brake Show, which he describes as "a broad church of automotive appreciation", and presents the Smith and Sniff podcast with Richard Porter.

Smith remains a motoring journalist, concentrating on his YouTube channel, enjoying classic, unusual, and custom cars as a hobby, too. Whilst having owned over 130 cars, he once built a classic electric hot rod called 'Jonny's Flux Capacitor', for a time the world's quickest street-legal EV. His other cars include a '68 Dodge Charger, a modified, re-engined, Honda VTEC powered Austin Allegro (in build), a 1964 Chevrolet Impala SS lowrider, a Porsche Boxster, a Brabus Smart Roadster, a Citroen 2CV, a Honda Insight, a Tokyo Taxi, a Tesla Model S, a Matra Rancho/Subaru Impreza hybrid (in build), a Hillman Avenger classic rally car and a 1967 Volkswagen Beetle (his first car, owned since he took his driving test at 17). This variety of vehicles, their upkeep, restoration and modification form a foundation for a significant part of his broadcast and podcast content.
