= Mud, Sweat & Gears =

Television series

- Genre: Entertainment
- Presented by: Tom Ford; Jonny Smith
- Country of origin: United States
- Original language: English
- No. of seasons: 1
- No. of episodes: 9

Production
- Executive producers: Jane Tranter; Nathaniel Grouille; Trice Barto; Michael Brooks
- Production location: California
- Running time: 60 minutes
- Production company: BBC Worldwide

Original release
- Network: BBC America
- Release: 26 January 2015 – present

Mud, Sweat & Gears is a reality television series that premiered on 26 January 2015 on BBC America in the U.S. and BBC Brit internationally. The hosts, Tom Ford and Jonny Smith, and two teams of two car enthusiasts have a day to perform car stunts in California.

== Production ==
BBC America and BBC Worldwide announced it had given the green-light for the series on 27 February 2014, which will broadcast on its channels across the globe. It is the first commission for BBC Brit. The series was ordered by Perry Simon and Tracy Forsyth. The executive producers are Nathaniel Grouille, Trice Barto, Michael Brooks and Jane Tranter. Filming began in March 2014.

== Episode list ==
Season 1

- 1. Cops (aired 26 January 2015)

Jonny Smith and Tom ‘Wookie’ Ford lead two teams – the Perkins brothers from Detroit and racers Keith and Rob from California – in building the ultimate cop cars. In 24 hours they transform regular cars into crazy creations, before competing head-to-head in three fast and furious missions. The challenges put their vehicles to the ultimate test and once the winner is declared, the losers’ car gets, well, annihilated.

- 2. Demolition (aired 2 February 2015)

Jonny Smith and Tom ‘Wookie’ Ford lead two teams and build their versions of the ultimate demolition vehicle. Jonny is joined by two auto-obsessed brothers from LA, while Wookie enlists the help of two mustachioed car tuners from Wisconsin. Things get tense as they race their creations head-to-head in three dangerously destructive missions, the last of which ends in the mother of all crashes.

- 3. Delivery (aired 9 February 2015)

The mail must get through! Jonny Smith and Tom ‘Wookie’ Ford lead two teams and transform regular cars into high-speed delivery vehicles. Kim and Rich, two car lovers from Michigan, join Wookie, while Jonny is joined by father-and-son car restoration experts from North Hollywood, Julian Junior and Julian Senior. They compete head-to-head in three over-the-top missions – both teams almost wipe out twice, Wookie claims it’s the most scared he’s been in his life.

- 4. Truck O' War (aired 16 February 2015)

What makes a Truck O’ War? Why guns and armor, naturally. Jonny Smith and Tom ‘Wookie’ Ford compete to transform regular trucks into trucks of war. Jonny’s team is made up of the pride of the South, custom car builders PJ ‘The PJ’ Burchett and his trusty sidekick Brett Melancon. Wookie’s helpers are performance tuners from Detroit. Things come to a head when vehicles collide and an argument brews that pushes Jonny and Wookie’s friendship to the limit.

- 5. Car-Lympics (aired 23 February 2015)

Cars that jump, wrestle and roll! Jonny Smith and Tom ‘Wookie’ Ford lead two teams and renovate regular cars into vehicular athletes. Jonny’s team consists of Chris and Sean from Houston, a couple of car enthusiasts barely out of college, while Wookie has a team of auto mechanics, PA and Jesse from San Diego. Head-to-head challenges include a car-sumo ring, a car steeplechase and car gymnastics. Both teams may be going for gold, but every race only has one winner.

- 6. Off-Road (aired 2 March 2015)

Jonny Smith and Tom ‘Wookie’ Ford lead two teams and build their versions of the ultimate off-road vehicle from regular cars. Jonny is joined by John and Luccia from Colorado, a couple of lovers who love cars. Wookie’s team is made up of best buds Benny and Darren from California. They race them head-to-head in three bone-shaking, off-road missions including the Bog of Doom, which is a bog, only doomier.

- 7. Spy (aired 9 March 2015)

Jonny Smith and Tom ‘Wookie’ Ford lead two teams and build their visions of the ultimate spy cars. Jonny, joined by car-crazy fabricators Tino and Aaron from Colorado, is all about the style, power and mystique. Wookie, however, thinks that gadgets rule, which is perfect for his team of high-tech brainiacs Erica and Jeff from San Francisco. They race in three intense spy-themed missions, where Jonny takes the disguise and ambush theme to the extreme!

- 8. Carmageddon (aired 16 March 2015)

Jonny Smith and Tom ‘Wookie’ Ford reinvent regular cars into their visions of the ultimate survival vehicle. Wookie’s team, Ilya and Rob from LA, bend the rules creating their supposedly indestructible beast, while Jonny and his team, Rob and Mason from San Francisco, transform America’s least successful car, the Pontiac Aztek. They compete in three apocalyptic missions which end with a fiery finish.

- 9. Carcade (aired 23 March 2015)

Imagine a video game come to life. Jonny Smith and Tom ‘Wookie’ Ford lead two teams and transform regular cars into real-world arcade cars. Jonny is joined by two car-dealing brothers from the East Coast, Adam and Craig. Wookie’s team is VW-racing brothers from Utah, Trent and Eric. They compete in three zany missions inspired by games such as Donkey Kong, Pong and Frogger – the racetracks are littered with hazards.

== Broadcast ==
In Australia, Mud, Sweat & Gears premiered on BBC Knowledge on 2 February 2015. In the United States, the series premiered on BBC America on 26 January 2015. In the United Kingdom, it premiered on History on 13 August 2015.

== See also ==
- Top Gear
