= Gadget Geeks =

2012 British TV series

- Directed by: Jake Cardew; Gareth Cornick; Matt Gillbe; Ross Young
- Presented by: Emma Barnett; Rory Reid; Ian Morris; Colin Furze; Charles Yarnold; Tom Scott
- Narrated by: Julian Rhind-Tutt
- Country of origin: United Kingdom
- No. of series: 1
- No. of episodes: 13

Production
- Executive producers: Ed Crick; Mike Griffiths
- Producer: Jake Attwell
- Running time: 60 minutes (inc. adverts)
- Production company: Bullseye Productions

Original release
- Network: Sky1
- Release: 16 January – 9 April 2012

Gadget Geeks is a British television series that aired on Sky1, and focused on technology and gadgets. The series differed to the Channel 5 series The Gadget Show, in that it did not just feature commercially available technology, but also specially built items designed by the in-house "geeks" (Tom Scott, Colin Furze, and Charles Yarnold).

The show was commissioned by Sky in 2011. After the show was aired, it was not commissioned for another series.

== Format ==
The show is divided into two sections. One features gadgets and technology that are available commercially. These segments are presented by technology journalists Rory Reid, Ian Morris and Emma Barnett. The other is "builds" where a problem is solved by the three experts creating their own gadgets to help a member of the public with a specific challenge. The builds are presented by Colin Furze, Tom Scott and Charles Yarnold.

== Episodes ==
No.	Title	Original release date
1	"Episode 1"	16 January 2012
Emma Barnett and Ian Morris head to Ibiza to help a holiday rep find the best underwater camera, while Colin Furze, Tom Scott and Charles Yarnold create a portable time slice camera rig to capture parkour stunts and transform a Sinclair C5 into a `monster machine'. Plus, Ian and Rory help 2011 Got to Dance champions Chris and Wes find the perfect speakers for street dancing.
2	"Episode 2"	23 January 2012
The team takes a set of self-powered water skis for a trial run, and invents a new paintball game inspired by a milk float. Plus, the geeks test celebrity-endorsed cooking equipment, and enlist the help of a triathlete to review the latest sports watches.
3	"Episode 3"	30 January 2012
The team presents a fashion store manager with a machine that vends T-shirts, and helps a farmer get rich off his land with a robotic treasure-finder. Plus, the geeks assist a golfing prodigy in his hunt for the best slow-motion camera.
4	"Episode 4"	6 February 2012
Emma Barnett, Rory Reid and Ian Morris test a robotic jockey's ability to exercise a busy rider's horse, and propose a new cannon delivery system to improve a fast-food business. Plus, a classical musician recommends the best noise-cancelling headphones, and a motorist looks at the latest electric cars.
5	"Episode 5"	13 February 2012
The team test-rides electric bikes and helps a film fan find the best surround-sound system. Plus, a restaurant powered by chip fat, and a comedian performing a gig from hundreds of miles away via virtual technology.
6	"Episode 6"	20 February 2012
The team heads to Spain to test a mind-controlled parachute, before travelling to the Valley football stadium, where Charlton Athletic's matchday announcer reviews a selection of tablet PCs. They also help a club owner appraise the latest DJ equipment, and create a urinal-based video game.
7	"Episode 7"	27 February 2012
The team transforms a skate park into one big computer game for a roller-blader, before making a robot herder for a farmer whose dog has a fear of sheep. Ian Morris, Emma Barnett and Rory Reid join an explorer to sample a range of `rugged' laptops, and try to persuade a group of models to spend a night in the woods with the latest camping technology.
8	"Episode 8"	5 March 2012
Charles Yarnold, Colin Furze and Tom Scott create an automated Twitter account enabling people to keep track of their cats, and a pub landlady is presented with a wine-launching device. A skateboarder joins Emma Barnett, Rory Reid and Ian Morris to test the latest extreme sports toys, and a groundsman puts a selection of robotic lawnmowers through their paces.
9	"F1 Special"	12 March 2012
The presenters take part in a special Formula 1 edition of the show.
10	"Episode 10"	19 March 2012
Colin Furze, Tom Scott and Charles Yarnold invent a song-writing machine for a band, before helping a businessman fit in a round of golf before work. Plus, Emma Barnett, Rory Reid and Ian Morris put sat-nav technology to the test, and a comic-book fan (Lex Lamprey) gives the trio a lesson in crime-fighting.
11	"Episode 11"	26 March 2012
Colin Furze, Tom Scott and Charles Yarnold design a dating machine to help a single woman find a man, while Emma Barnett, Rory Reid and Ian Morris review the latest get-fit gadgets. Plus, a toy-shop owner receives an addition to her shelves, and the team goes star-gazing with the help of some hi-tech telescopes.
12	"Episode 12"	2 April 2012
Colin Furze, Tom Scott and Charles Yarnold invent a tattoo printer, while Ian Morris, Rory Reid and Emma Barnett review the latest remote control helicopters. A group of cyclists examines bike accessories, and a B&B owner gets help with the laundry.
13	"Episode 13"	9 April 2012
The Geeks help out a hotel and design a special window with a stunning view. They find out all there is to know about the latest range of eBook readers too.
