= Colin Furze =

British YouTube personality

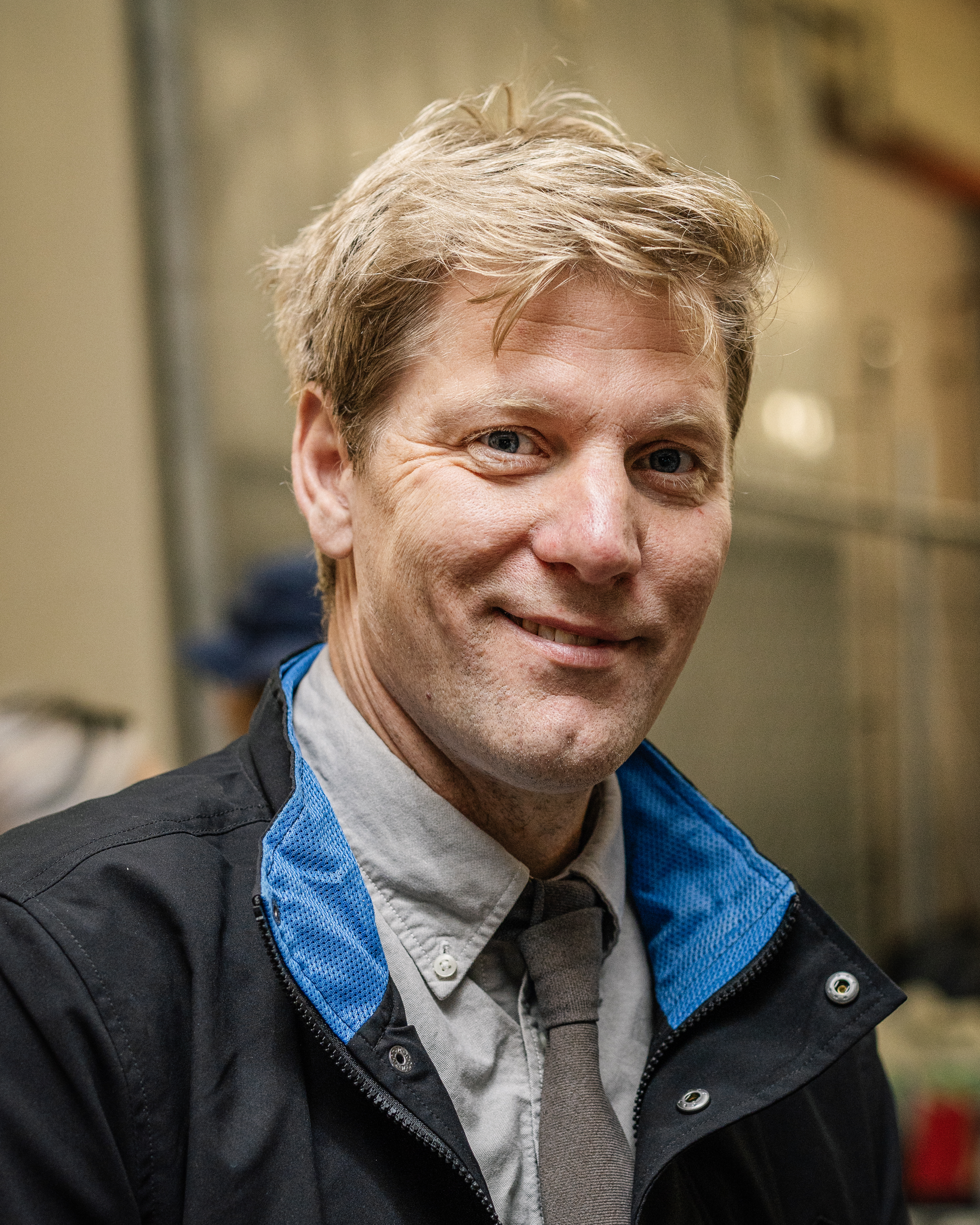
- Furze in 2024
- Born: 14 October 1979 (age 47); Stamford, Lincolnshire, England
- Occupations: YouTuber; stuntman; inventor; maker; filmmaker
- Years active: 2006–present

YouTube information
- Channel: colinfurze
- Subscribers: 13.2 million
- Views: 1.84 billion
- Last updated: 30 March 2025
- Website: colinfurze.com at the Wayback Machine (archived 2023-12-18)

Colin Furze (born 14 October 1979) is a British YouTuber, inventor, engineer, and television presenter from Stamford, Lincolnshire. He is best known for his eccentric engineering projects and DIY inventions showcased on his YouTube channel, which has over 13 million subscribers and more than 1.8 billion views. His notable creations include a working hoverbike, an underground bunker, the world's longest motorcycle, a 71 mph (114 km/h) mobility scooter, and a motorised pram, many of which have broken Guinness World Records.

Originally trained as a plumber, Furze began uploading videos to YouTube in 2006 and gained popularity for his inventive and often dangerous contraptions, many of which are built in his home workshop. He has collaborated with major franchises such as Assassin's Creed, X-Men, and Star Wars, and has made appearances on British and German television, including Gadget Geeks and Joko gegen Klaas – Das Duell um die Welt.

== Biography ==
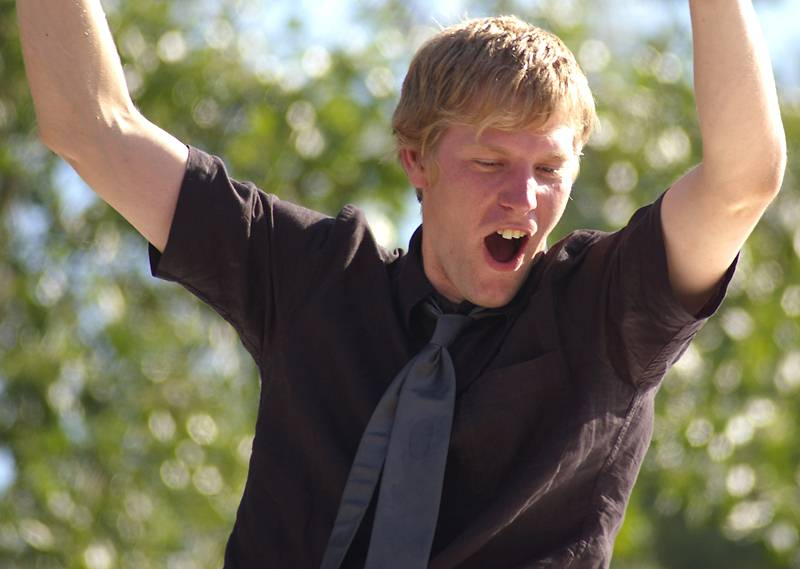
Furze in 2012

Furze has said that he attended Malcolm Sargent Primary School as a child until he entered secondary school. By then, he had already begun making underground dens and a few tree houses. He became a plumber after leaving school at 16, which allowed him to focus on creating tools, gadgets, and other engineering inventions. Shortly after the death of his father, he discovered the video-sharing website YouTube, on which he shared his inventions beginning with his wall of death ramp in 2007.

== Inventions ==
Furze's many contraptions are publicised on his YouTube channel. On 13 March 2010, he uploaded a video of his converted scooter, incorporating a flame thrower that could shoot flames up to 15 feet (4.5 m) in the air. On 25 March 2010, Furze was arrested by Lincolnshire Police, for possessing an object converted into a firearm (in UK law, a flame thrower is a type of firearm). He was released on bail without charge the next day. This was Furze's third attempt at producing such a device, as the first did not ignite and the second burst into flames.

On 5 May 2014, Furze posted a video to kick off his three-week-long X-Men characters special by designing a set of realistic Wolverine claws based on a pneumatic system. Within its first week it had received over three million views.

On 23 October 2015, Furze released a video showing off the start of a new multi-part build, in which he would construct a Hidden Blade to promote the new Ubisoft game, Assassin's Creed: Syndicate. Furze went on to make the Hidden Blade, a spring-loaded concealed blade that activates at the flick of the wrist with the help of a ring-triggered wheel mechanism, a rope launcher and a winch device, all built onto a frame that fit his wrist.

In November 2015, Furze constructed an underground bomb shelter beneath his garden, as part of a request by Sky1 to promote the series You, Me and the Apocalypse. The bunker contains a corridor and a large main room, as well as a fully functional air filtration system and has an entrance shaft concealed by a garden shed.

In 2016, Furze created a "hoverbike" using two paramotors.

Furze has completed three Star Wars themed challenges in partnership with eBay. In 2016, he completed a giant AT-AT garden playhouse, followed by a full size Kylo Ren Tie Silencer in 2017. In 2019, he completed a moving Landspeeder from Star Wars A New Hope. The vehicle was auctioned off on eBay, with all of the funds going to BBC Children in Need.

In May 2018, Furze completed a working life-size Hulkbuster armor in partnership with eBay, from which he sourced the parts. He also worked with YouTuber James Bruton, who made the control panel to operate the machine.

In December 2020, he created a 14-metre-high (46 ft) trebuchet capable of throwing a washing machine.

In March 2022, he announced the completion of a tunnel that links his house and his workshop. Lined with metal sheets and concrete, it took him three years to construct. Extensions towards the bunker and the driveway are planned next.

In April 2023, Furze constructed a machine that he said made him "weightless". It worked by having a pivot 3 metres in the air with a 7.5-metre (25 ft) extendable arm and seat on one side, and a 1-tonne concrete block as a counterweight on the other. This allowed him to jump higher, as the counterweight almost balances his weight.

His main YouTube channel has 13 million subscribers, while his second channel 2 much Colin Furze has 1,110,000 subscribers as of 28 June 2024.

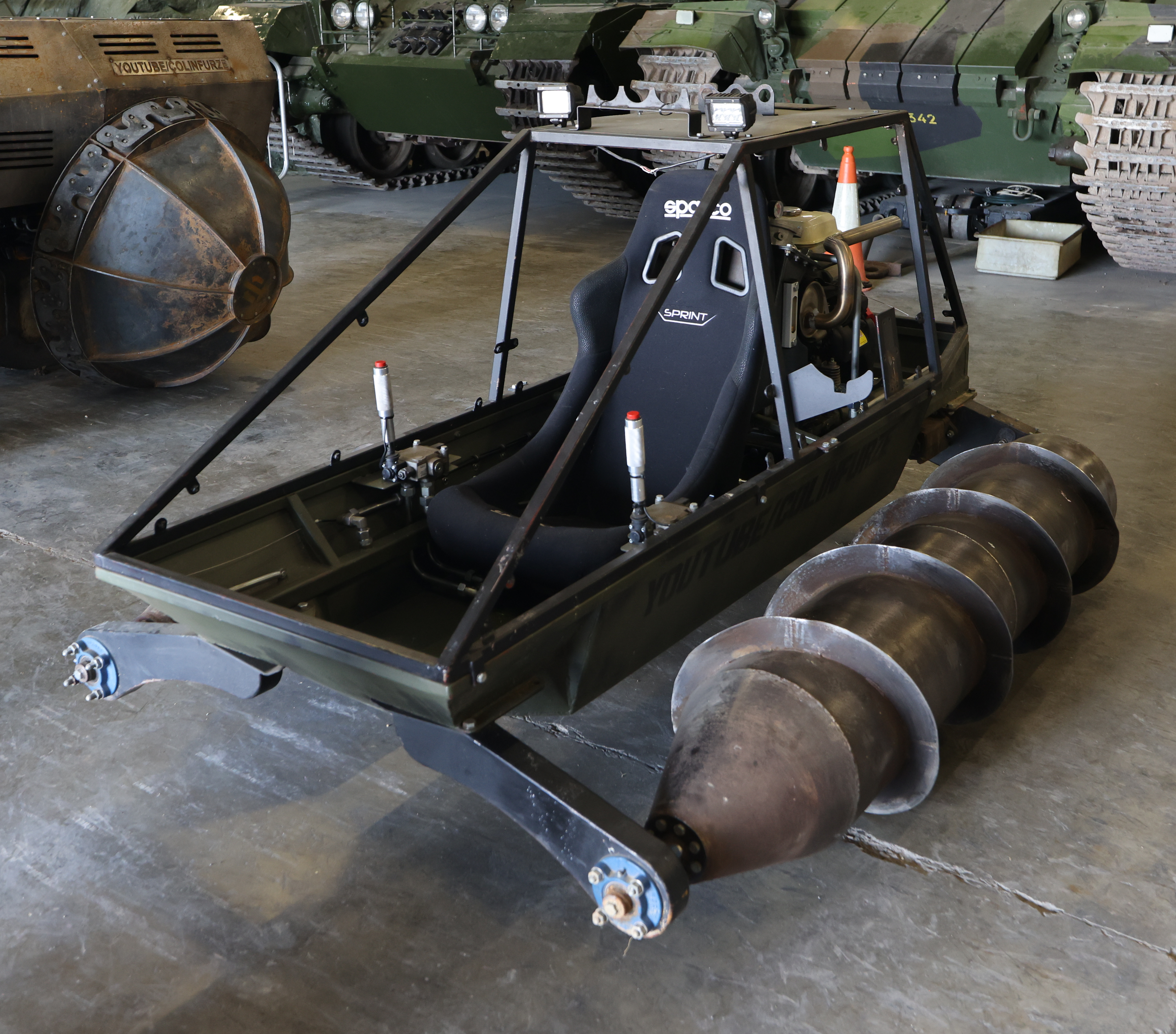
Colin Furze's Screw tank

== Achievements ==
On 24 October 2008, Furze revealed a 14.26-metre-long (46.8-foot) motorbike that he had built to break the world record of the longest motorcycle. This was done by attaching beams in place of the back. He completed the record by riding it a minimum of 100 m (330 feet).

On 14 October 2010, it was announced that Furze had modified a mobility scooter to give it the ability to reach 71 mph (114 km/h) in an attempt to enter the Guinness Book of Records. It took him nearly three months to build and has a 125 cc (7.6 cu in) motocross engine.

On 10 October 2012, Furze posted a video showing a pram fitted with an engine which, if it travelled over 30 mph (48 km/h), would make it the world's fastest pram. He succeeded in breaking the world record by achieving 53.46 mph (86.04 km/h). The pram was featured in the October 2013 copy of Popular Science Magazine, in which Furze was interviewed about his reasons for having modified the pram.

On 30 March 2017, Furze posted a video showing a restored 1960s dodgem fitted with a 600 cc (37 cu in) motor cycle engine producing around 100 bhp (75 kW). The dodgem achieved a top speed of 107.390 mph (172.827 km/h), with an average speed of 100.336 mph (161.475 km/h) from a run in each direction – making it the world's fastest bumper car, as approved by Guinness World Records. BBC Worldwide asked Furze to complete the project for The Stig to drive.

== Honours ==
In summer 2025, Furze was awarded an honorary Doctor of Science (DSc) degree by the University of Warwick for his contributions to engineering education and for inspiring public interest in STEM through his inventive and widely viewed online content.

== Television ==
Furze made his television debut by appearing as the 'Mystery Guest' in Episode 1, Series 3 of Russell Howard's Good News, where he showed off his mobility scooter project. The scooter was damaged in transit and was unable to work properly on stage, but Russell got on the scooter regardless and Furze pushed him around on it.

Furze appeared as one of the experts on Gadget Geeks, the short-lived Sky1 series, in which the trio of experts would consult a member of the British public to test an invention idea in the workplace, along with the journalist Tom Scott and Charles Yarnold. Furze has been 'number one' multiple times on the Science Channel show Outrageous Acts of Science and has appeared on the E4 show Virtually Famous twice, demonstrating his wolverine claws on 28 July 2014 and again, the following year, showcasing the "toaster knife". He went further afield, appearing on German television with his toaster knife.

He appeared as a guest and "challenge" in the third season of the German TV game show Joko gegen Klaas – Das Duell um die Welt. One of the contestants had to be Furze's assistant for a day and had to test any invention he presented.

Furze's inventions were featured on 11 February 2020 episode of Great British Inventions hosted by David Jason.

== Books ==
Furze authored This Book Isn't Safe, a collection of projects intended for children and adults to recreate at home and spur an interest in engineering.
