= Cool Stuff: How It Works =

Documentary television mini-series

Cool Stuff: How It Works is a multi-part documentary television mini-series that premiered in 2007 on the Discovery Channel. The program is based on an existing book about how "Modern Marvels" actually work. The show is hosted by Steve Truitt.

The mini-series was produced by Beyond International Group, the creator of the successful Discovery Channel series MythBusters and Prototype This!, amongst other production credits.

== See also ==
- List of Australian television series
