= Sarah Barnett =

Sarah Barnett is a British media executive. She was president and general manager at AMC Networks, Sundance TV and BBC America.

== Career ==
Barnett was the eldest daughter of six children. When she was 10, her mother died. Her father worked for an advertising agency, and commuted 70 miles to London every day. An art history graduate of the University of Warwick, Barnett worked for the BBC in London for 12 years. She began working for the corporation two years before her graduation, and remained there as a way to pay off her student debt.

Barnett joined AMC Networks in 2008 as senior vice president of marketing and was promoted to president and general manager the following year. She launched a strategy of scripted programming, including Carlos. Carlos, a biopic of Carlos the Jackal by French director Olivier Assayas, was the first scripted original of Barnett's tenure; the rights were also desired by IFC, a channel under the same ownership, and a compromise was reached by CEO Josh Sapan for it to debut as a miniseries on Barnett's Sundance TV before being shown in full on IFC.

As president and general manager at Sundance TV, Barnett developed programmes such as Rectify, Top of the Lake and The Honourable Woman. While Rectify, about a man released from death row, did not attract large audiences, it was critically acclaimed; AMC Networks CEO Ed Carroll credited its success to Barnett's work with writer-director Ray McKinnon.

In November 2014, Barnett was appointed president and general manager at BBC America. At BBC America, she developed Killing Eve, which was a commercial and critical success. Barnett had analysed audience research on BBC America's popular broadcasts of Doctor Who and found that its success was not due to being science fiction but for its story, characters and societal themes, which were also found in Killing Eve. The Walking Dead showrunner Angela Kang credited Barnett with supporting the series into its tenth season.

In November 2018, AMC Networks promoted Barnett to oversee the channels AMC, Sundance TV, BBC America and IFC. She announced in July 2020 that she was leaving this role as entertainment president.
