= Tom Ford (presenter) =

British motoring journalist & TV presenter (b.1976)

- Born: 3 January 1976 (age 49); Leicestershire, England
- Occupations: Journalist; presenter
- Television: Fifth Gear; Top Gear America

Tom Ford (born 3 January 1976) is a British motoring journalist and television presenter. He was the co-host of Five motoring television series Fifth Gear from 2002 until 2009. In 2017, he began presenting Top Gear America for BBC America.

== Education ==
While studying for his philosophy degree at Essex University Ford joined a performance art group called Kiss My Axe, before a brief time with a circus. He later returned to education and obtained another degree in journalism.

== Journalism ==
Ford's writing includes a stint at Car magazine where he rose from staff writer to road test editor. He currently writes for Top Gear magazine as a contributing editor for the publication, having previously been Deputy Editor for the publication. He also regularly writes for the Sunday Times motoring section.

In March 2014, he began filming Mud, Sweat & Gears.

== Fifth Gear ==
Ford became a presenter of Fifth Gear for Channel 5 in 2002. The show was planned to be cancelled in 2009, however it did return in 2010 but without Ford.

In autumn of 2007 he crashed heavily during the filming of episode 7 of series 12 which resulted in broken toes. After winning a drifting competition on Bedford Rascal van against his colleague, Ford went for a glory run; however, during the power slide he put the car on two wheels and ended up in the barrier. After experience of rolling over in Reliant Robin in a similar event earlier in the series, he was wearing a substantial amount of protective gear, and his only major injuries were three broken toes.

== Top Gear America ==
Ford was announced as one of the presenters of BBC America motoring television series, Top Gear America, an American version of Top Gear. It began airing on July 30, 2017.
