= Top Gear series 24 =

Top Gear
- Series 24
- Starring: Matt LeBlanc; Chris Harris; Rory Reid; Sabine Schmitz; Eddie Jordan; The Stig
- No. of episodes: 7

Release
- Original network: BBC Two
- Original release: 5 March – 23 April 2017

Series chronology
- ← Previous; Series 23 Next → Series 25

Series 24 of Top Gear, a British motoring magazine and factual television programme, was broadcast in the United Kingdom on BBC Two during 2017, consisting of seven episodes between 5 March and 23 April; due to the BBC's live coverage of the Masters Tournament on 9 April, the series took a break between its fifth and sixth episodes. This series' highlights included road trip across Kazakhstan in high-mileage cars, a race between a car and several high-value forms of transportation, and the presenters converting a car into a yacht.

Following the negative feedback on the previous series, and the resignation of Chris Evans a day after its conclusion, production staff decided on the remaining presenter Matt LeBlanc being joined by Chris Harris and Rory Reid as his co-hosts full time, with occasional appearances by both Sabine Schmitz and Eddie Jordan. To improve the programme's viewing figures, staff opted for a revamp of Top Gear's studio, logo and opening titles, while restoring its celebrity segment to its previous format, but with minor changes to the name and style when they opted for the use of a fast car.

== Production ==
Following the mixed to negative feedback for the previous series from critics and viewers, and the resignation of Chris Evans, the show underwent a revamp, with the creation of a brand new studio, complete with new seats, a racing tyre designed table and new screens, along with a brand new logo design and opening titles. In addition, along with continuing to host BBC Three companion show, Extra Gear, the BBC decided to reassign both Chris Harris and Rory Reid as Top Gear's main hosts alongside Matt LeBlanc. In February 2017, it was confirmed that comedian George Lewis would be joining the spin-off programme as a presenter alongside Harris and Reid. It was also announced that the format of the Star in a Reasonably Priced Car segment would return for Series 24, after the BBC dropped the controversial Star in a Rally-Cross Car segment that had replaced it due to the negative feedback it received. As the previous car for the segment, the Vauxhall Astra Tech Line, had been sent back to Vauxhall and auctioned off for charity, a brand new car was provided for the segment, the Toyota GT86, leading to the segment being renamed as Star in a Reasonably Fast Car.

=== Marketing ===
On 4 February 2017, BBC Two began showcasing trailers for the new series, with the caption "Top Gear: Coming Soon". On 24 February, Top Gear's official Twitter page confirmed that the twenty-fourth series would premiere on 5 March 2017, broadcasting seven weekly episodes.

== Episodes ==
No. overall	No. in series	Reviews	Features/challenges	Guest(s)	Original release date	UK viewers (millions)
186	1	Ferrari FXX-K	Race across Kazakhstan in three high-mileage cars: (Volvo V70 • Mercedes-Benz E-Class (W210) • Black Cab)	James McAvoy	5 March 2017	3.77
LeBlanc, Harris and Reid head to Kazakhstan with three cars that have done 480,000 miles, to see which is the most reliable - Harris opts to prove reliability will come from the Volvo V70, LeBlanc believes it will come from the Mercedes-Benz E-Class (W210), and Reid seeks to prove that London's famous Black Cab will outdo the other two. Starting from Turkistan, the trio have two days to make it to the Baikonur Cosmodrome, where along the way their cars will face a series of challenges to see how reliable they really are. Elsewhere, Harris heads for the Daytona International Speedway in Florida to test out the new, truly exclusive Ferrari FXX-K, while James McAvoy is the star taking on the new reasonably fast Toyota GT86. Note: Footage of other celebrities that timed laps in the Toyota GT86, before James McAvoy's turn, were showcased on Extra Gear following this episode.
187	2	Alfa Romeo Giulia Quadrifoglio	US road trip in two convertible supercars: (Porsche 911 Turbo S Cabriolet • Lamborghini Huracán Spyder)	David Tennant	12 March 2017	3.60
LeBlanc and Harris head to the US for a road trip through hot deserts and snowy mountains, to try out the latest convertible supercars on the market - LeBlanc selecting the Lamborghini Huracán Spyder and the Harris choosing the Porsche 911 Turbo S Cabriolet - where along the way, their cars will be subjected to challenges based on each season of the year. Meanwhile, Harris finds out if the Giulia Quadrifoglio can bring back the good times of classic Alfa Romeos, even if Reid insists on putting it through a tough test at the track, and David Tennant joins the hosts in the studio to see how fast he was in the Reasonably Fast Car.
188	3	Aston Martin DB11 • Volkswagen Golf GTI Clubsport S • Abarth 124 Spider	DB11 vs Mercedes-AMG S63 Coupé Bond Style • Clubsport S: "Supercar hunting" at the Nürburgring	Tamsin Greig	19 March 2017	3.13
LeBlanc is out on the Test Track with the brand new Aston Martin DB11, the first turbocharged Aston Martin and the first DB to reach 200 mph, before heading to the Baltic mountains as "LeBond" for a race against "Dr No-Hair" Harris in his Mercedes-AMG S63 Coupé, and the local police force. Elsewhere, Reid and Sabine take to the Nürburgring in the new Volkswagen Golf GTI Clubsport S to see if it can overtake £1 million worth of supercars, LeBlanc questions if the magic of Italian sports cars of the 60s has been revived in the Abarth 124 Spider, and Tamsin Greig copes with a wet track in the GT86.
189	4	Bugatti Chiron • Renault Twingo GT	Epic race across Arabian Peninsula: Chiron vs. alternative "money-no-object" transportation • Twingo arcade game challenge	Tinie Tempah	26 March 2017	3.17
Harris heads out to Dubai to find out how fast and elegant the new Bugatti Chiron is compared to its predecessor, the Veyron, before later engaging it in a race that begins in the city and finishes at a hotel resort in the mountains of Oman, with LeBlanc attempting to beat him through a variety of "money-no-object" transportation options, including a motorboat, luxury car, private jet, and the new Ducati 1299 Superleggera. Meanwhile, Rory test drives the Renault Twingo GT to find out how nimble a hatchback it is by using it in a special version of a classic arcade video game with help from Harris and Sabine, and rapper Tinie Tempah discusses about why he shot a music video in South Africa and not Dunsfold before seeing how good he was in the Reasonably Fast Car.
190	5	Ford GT	Extreme off-road buggy race on the California desert	Chris Hoy	2 April 2017	3.27
To settle a dispute about who is the fastest racing driver on the team, Harris and Sabine head to California to compete in an extreme off-road motorsport event - "King of the Hammers". Assisted by Eddie and LeBlanc as their personal race managers, the pair take part in an eight-lap race, driving off-road buggies against veteran drivers, while contending with tough obstacles, including a difficult rock climb. Elsewhere, LeBlanc gets to be the first to drive the new Ford GT and see how much of a supercar it is on both a coastal highway and the Laguna Seca circuit, while former British Olympic cyclist Chris Hoy discusses his new life as a racing driver, before seeing if he is the fastest around the track in the GT86.
191	6	Mercedes-AMG GT R	Road trip across Cuba with second-hand sports cars: (Maserati Biturbo • Chevrolet Camaro)	Ross Noble	16 April 2017	2.40
Harris and Reid head to Cuba to kickstart a new revolution with some second-hand, western sports cars, hoping to show the country's inhabitants that there are better models than the American classics they've relied upon since the 60s - Harris believes his Maserati Biturbo will inspire the people, while Reid hopes his Chevrolet Camaro will turn heads. Taking them on a road trip across the island nation from the Bay of Pigs to Havana, the pair put them through their paces, including a series of racing challenges against the local competition. Meanwhile, LeBlanc gets to grips with a contender for his favorite Porsche, by heading to the track in the new Mercedes-AMG GT R and seeing how it fares, while comedian Ross Noble is the latest star to have a go in the Reasonably Fast Car. Note: David Schwimmer was the intended guest for this episode, but had to pull out due to complications in his private life, effectively leading to Ross Noble's appearance in the series being brought forward much earlier than planned.
192	7	Porsche 718 Cayman S • Avtoros Shaman	Turning a SsangYong Rodius into a luxury yacht	Jay Kay	23 April 2017	2.69
Harris heads to the track, where he finds issues in the new Porsche 718 Cayman S, despite it being faster and nicer to drive than the previous Cayman S. Meanwhile, LeBlanc heads out to the countryside to try out the extraordinary Avtoros Shaman, an 8x8 rescue vehicle from Russia; Reid attempts to see if an ugly SsangYong Rodius can be transformed into a luxury yacht, including putting his creation to the open waters with help from Harris and LeBlanc and showing off their creation to Eddie; and Jay Kay talks about his car collection, his new album with Jamiroquai, and how well he did when he drove in the GT86. Note: Jay kay's appearance in the episode was due to its intended guest, Ross Noble, having to appear much earlier in the series than planned.
