= Top Gear series 27 =

Top Gear
- Series 27
- Starring: Freddie Flintoff; Chris Harris; Paddy McGuinness; Sabine Schmitz; The Stig
- No. of episodes: 5

Release
- Original network: BBC Two
- Original release: 16 June – 14 July 2019

Series chronology
- ← Previous; Series 26 Next → Series 28

Series 27 of Top Gear, a British motoring magazine and factual television programme, was broadcast on BBC Two during 2019, consisting of five episodes between 16 June and 14 July. Following the previous series, production staff discontinued Extra Gear, while both Matt LeBlanc and Rory Reid left the programme, leaving Chris Harris to be joined by two new co-hosts: Paddy McGuinness and Freddie Flintoff. The new line-up proved popular with viewers, effectively improving the programme's viewing figures after the previous two series. This series' highlights included a road trip across Ethiopia, converting a hearse into a family car, and the presenters creating their own budget electric sports cars.

== Production ==
On 31 May 2018, Matt LeBlanc announced that he would leave Top Gear after the completion of the twenty-sixth series.

On 22 October 2018, it was confirmed that Freddie Flintoff and Paddy McGuinness would join a returning Chris Harris in the forthcoming series, replacing both LeBlanc and Rory Reid, while Sabine Schmitz continued her recurring presenting role.

During an interview on BBC Radio 1 in January 2019, Harris revealed that filming for this series had commenced.

== Episodes ==
No. overall	No. in series	Reviews	Features/challenges	Guest(s)	Original release date	UK viewers (millions)
204	1	Ferrari 488 Pista • McLaren 600LT	Ethiopian adventure in the presenters' first cars (Mini • Porsche Boxster • Ford Escort Mk2)	None	16 June 2019	4.81
205	2	Tesla Model 3	Building budget battery powered sports cars (Triumph Spitfire • Subaru Brat • Nissan Leaf)	Danny Boyle • Himesh Patel	23 June 2019	4.64
206	3	Dallara Stradale	Turning a Daimler Hearse into the ultimate family car	Damon Hill • Zara Tindall • Mike Tindall	30 June 2019	4.44
207	4	Rolls-Royce Cullinan	Rare cheap cars across Borneo (Austin Allegro • Matra Bagheera)	Bob Mortimer	7 July 2019	4.63
208	5	Toyota Supra	Iceland's Formula Off Road • Tribute to the Lotus 79	Will Young • Peter Wright • Mario Andretti • Clive Chapman	14 July 2019	3.77
