= Top Gear series 26 =

Top Gear
- Series 26
- Starring: Matt LeBlanc; Chris Harris; Rory Reid; Sabine Schmitz; The Stig
- No. of episodes: 5

Release
- Original network: BBC Two
- Original release: 17 February – 17 March 2019

Series chronology
- ← Previous; Series 25 Next → Series 27

Series 26 of Top Gear, a British motoring magazine and factual television programme, was on BBC Two during 2019, consisting of five episodes between 17 February and 17 March. Although Sabine Schmitz would continue to make appearances as a guest star, Eddie Jordan discontinued his involvement following the previous series. This series' highlights included a journey across Sri Lanka in a Tuk-Tuk, presenters conducting challenges with second-hand luxury cars and a compilation of outtakes in the final episode. The twenty-sixth series attracted the lowest viewing figures in the programme's history, achieving an average of 2.35 million viewers during its broadcast.

This series was the last to feature Matt LeBlanc, and Rory Reid as the programme’s presenters.

== Production ==
Production on the series began in 2017 with a trip to Norway and concluded in 2018.

== Episodes ==
No. overall	No. in series	Reviews	Features/challenges	Guest(s)	Original release date	UK viewers (millions)
199	1	Suzuki Ignis	Fast Estate Cars in Norway: (Porsche Panamera Turbo Sport Turismo • Ferrari GTC4Lusso) • Ignis vs Fiat Panda Cross up Gurlet Hill	James Marsden	17 February 2019	2.61
Harris and LeBlanc head to Norway to look at alternative Estates to the Class Leading Skoda Superb - Harris brings the Porsche Panamera Turbo Sport Turismo and LeBlanc takes the Ferrari GTC4Lusso. They put them through as series of challenges testing the speed, practicality and capability of their choices. Meanwhile, Reid attempts to prove the Suzuki Ignis is all the car one needs by climbing and christening Gurlet Hill with assistance from Sabine, and actor James Marsden has a go in the GT86.
200	2	BMW M5 • Mercedes-Benz E63 AMG S	Tuk-Tuk Trip across Sri Lanka	Professor Green	24 February 2019	2.27
Heading to Sri Lanka, Harris attempts to prove to LeBlanc that the Tuk-Tuk is "the most versatile vehicle in the world" through a road trip with several challenges along the way. Meanwhile, at the Track, Harris compares the new BMW M5 to the Mercedes-Benz E63 AMG S to see which is the best alternative to HS2, and rapper Professor Green sets a lap in the Reasonably Fast Car.
201	3	Bentley Continental GT • Mégane Renault Sport • Porsche 911 GT2 RS	Continental GT vs Speed 8	Gregory Porter	3 March 2019	2.28
Harris and LeBlanc head to Spain for a dual review of the latest Bentley Continental GT driving it through many roads and conditions before racing it against the 2003 Bentley Speed 8 at the Ascari Race Resort. Meanwhile, at the Track, Harris reviews the new Porsche 911 GT2 RS questioning if it's the best 911, Reid wonders if the latest Mégane Renault Sport captures the Magic of old Renault Hot Hatches, and singer Gregory Porter sees how fast he is in the GT86.
202	4	None	Second Hand Luxury Car Challenge: (Rolls-Royce Silver Shadow • Mercedes-Benz 600SEL • Bentley Turbo R)	Matt Baker	10 March 2019	2.20
The presenters attempt to prove that Second Hand Luxury Cars are better than an equivalently priced Dacia Sandero - LeBlanc purchases a Bentley Turbo R, Reid buys a Rolls-Royce Silver Shadow and Harris acquires a Mercedes-Benz 600SEL. After several comparison tests against the Sandero at the Track, they modify their cars for racing at the 6 Hour Birkett Race at Silverstone. Meanwhile, presenter Matt Baker challenges LeBlanc to a digger contest before setting a lap in the Reasonably Fast Car.
203	5	Aston Martin V8 Vantage • Rolls-Royce Phantom • Ford Fiesta ST	Fiesta ST vs. Lamborghini Aventador S • Automatic Brake Testing	Stephen Mangan	17 March 2019	2.40
Harris tests the new Ford Fiesta ST in Wales and proves through many thorough tests that it's better than a Lamborghini Aventador S before showing the best ordinary cars one can buy. Elsewhere Reid sees if the newest Rolls-Royce Phantom is "the best car in the world" and tests automatic braking using a Volkswagen Arteon. Meanwhile, LeBLanc is at the Track to review the latest Aston Martin V8 Vantage questioning if it is better than equivalent sports cars and Stephen Mangan attempts to drive the GT86 faster than LeBlanc drove a Kia Cee'd. The presenters end their final series by showing many outtakes.
