= Top Gear series 23 =

Top Gear
- Series 23
- Promotional poster
- Starring: Chris Evans; Matt LeBlanc; Sabine Schmitz; Chris Harris; Rory Reid; Eddie Jordan; The Stig
- No. of episodes: 6

Release
- Original network: BBC Two
- Original release: 29 May – 3 July 2016

Series chronology
- ← Previous; Series 22 Next → Series 24

Series 23 of Top Gear, a British motoring magazine and factual television programme, was broadcast in the United Kingdom on BBC Two during 2016, consisting of six episodes between 29 May and 3 July; an additional four episodes were planned but not produced. Following the dismissal of Jeremy Clarkson, and the subsequent departures of Richard Hammond and James May in the previous series, the BBC hired Chris Evans and Matt LeBlanc as the new hosts, with Sabine Schmitz, Chris Harris, Rory Reid and Eddie Jordan as their co-presenters, but appearing only when required for an episode.

The twenty-third series saw the discontinuation of segments used by the previous presenters, modifying the celebrity segment to involve a timed lap on a newly designed rallycross circuit with a Mini Rallycross Car - the Vauxhall Astra Tech Line was sent back following the previous series - and a redesign of the programme's studio at Dunsfold. In addition, the programme received a spin-off show titled Extra Gear, which was presented by Harris and Reid and broadcast on online channel BBC Three, with each episode airing after those of the main programme. This series' highlights included a competition between British and American cars, and a race from London to Venice between cheap cars and a luxury train.

Although it was met with some positive praise, particularly with LeBlanc as one of the new presenters, viewers mostly gave negative feedback on the changes, criticising the new format of the celebrity segment and the presentation style of Evans. Viewing figures weakened over the series' broadcast, with the final episode drawing in the lowest overnight viewing figures ever in the show's history; both these and the negative feedback to his involvement led to Evans resigning the day after the last episode's broadcast, and forced a rethink by production staff on the show's future.

== Production ==
Following Jeremy Clarkson's dismissal from the show on 25 March 2015, after the BBC decided not to renew his contract, and the subsequent resignations of his co-hosts Richard Hammond and James May and executive producer Andy Wilman the following month, the broadcaster began work looking for a new production team and a new set of hosts for the next series of the show, as well as making changes to the show's format. People who were in the running to replace Clarkson included Jodie Kidd, John Bishop, Suzi Perry, Adrian Chiles, Vicki Butler-Henderson, Chris Evans, Steve Coogan, Tiff Needell, Eddie Jordan, Eddie Irvine, Dermot O'Leary, Ant and Dec, Guy Martin and Rowan Atkinson. On 16 June later that year, Evans was confirmed as one of the new hosts for the show, with it announced in October that filming of the series had commenced and that the series was set to be broadcast in May 2016. Following news that the BBC had decided to make savings by discontinuing coverage of future F1 seasons, speculation was made that former Formula 1 driver David Coulthard would be joining the show, but these were dismissed when Coulthard was revealed to be the host of Channel 4's coverage for the 2016 F1 season in January 2016. Carl Fogarty, Chris Harris and Sabine Schmitz were all reported to be in the running to present the show alongside Evans; Fogarty subsequently ruled himself out of the running. News of who else was to join remained a mystery, with Evans even commenting that he could be left hosting the show himself, but on 4 February 2016, American actor Matt LeBlanc was officially announced as part of the hosting line-up to work with Evans. A week later on 11 February, during his BBC Radio 2 Breakfast Show, Evans confirmed that he and LeBlanc would be joined by The Stig, along with four other new presenters who had each won an open audition to be part of the show – Eddie Jordan (who split with doing F1 Coverage following the BBC's decision over the sport's coverage), Harris, Schmitz, and motoring journalist and Sky television presenter Rory Reid. Of the relationship between the six new presenters, Evans stated in an interview with BBC News that it was decided that only he and LeBlanc would front the show weekly in the studio segments, whilst the other presenters would "come and go as and when required".

Production on the series, alongside filming, included dropping the Cool Wall and News segments, while overhauling the celebrity segment after the abrupt end of Series 22 had led to the subsequent decision sending the Vauxhall Astra Tech Line back to its manufacturer, where it was later auctioned off on 27 December 2015 for £17,800. Renamed as Stars in a Rallycross Car, the segment featured a longer interview process, with two celebrities invited to the show for each episode (as had happened before in Series 11), before taking to a new circuit in a modified Mini Cooper that had been prepared for rallycross driving. The new rallycross circuit provided for the remade segment, incorporated parts of the existing Top Gear Test Track, such as the use of "Gambon", but included two new off-road sections, which featured a water splash obstacle and a jump; the existing circuit received a cosmetic update to the line markings – still used for "Power Laps". A revamp of the studio at Dunsfold was also conducted to match the new look of the show, with work including providing more space for the audience, relocation of the stage area, and less use of monitors and light scaffolding around the rest of the studio. In addition, the revamp also saw the removal of the plinths used by the former hosts' cars (including the one for Toyota Hilux) as well as the cars used on them, but retaining the banner for The Stig. In addition to work being done to create the new series, the BBC announced on 27 April 2016, that production of a spin-off show called Extra Gear for BBC Three, was also being worked on, which was to feature additional clips and behind-the-scenes look at some of the films shown on each episode that was broadcast of Series 23, with both Rory Reid and Chris Harris announced as the presenters for it.

== Episodes ==
No. overall	No. in series	Reviews	Features/challenges	Guest(s)	Original release date	UK viewers (millions)
180	1	Ariel Nomad • Chevrolet Corvette Z06 • Dodge Viper ACR	UK vs USA Challenge: (Reliant Rialto • Land Rover Mk1 • Willys Jeep)	Jesse Eisenberg • Gordon Ramsay • Alistair Brownlee • Jonathan Brownlee	29 May 2016	6.42
New hosts Evans and LeBlanc head to Blackpool for a competition between British and American cars, with challenges including a timed speed test, a game of "car tug-of-war", a race involving each towing an ice cream van and transporting drag queens, before concluding with an off-road race with a difficult condition. Elsewhere, Evans tests out the new Dodge Viper ACR at NAS Fallon in Nevada, pitting it in a challenge against a Chevrolet Corvette Z06 driven by Schmitz, while LeBlanc heads to Morocco to see how good the Ariel Nomad is on and off the road. Finally, the hosts pit actor Jesse Eisenberg and chef Gordon Ramsay at being the first stars to each do a lap on the programme's new rallycross circuit and setting a time in the new rallycross car.
181	2	McLaren 675LT	Ultimate SUV test: (Jaguar F-Pace • Porsche Macan • Mercedes-Benz GLC)	Jenson Button • Damian Lewis • Seasick Steve • Tinie Tempah • Sharleen Spiteri	5 June 2016	4.06
Evans, LeBlanc and Jordan head to South Africa for a road trip, to determine which is the best SUV out of the latest offerings – Evans believes it is the new Jaguar F-Pace, LeBlanc feels that the Porsche Macan is the better SUV, while Jordan reasons that the Mercedes-Benz GLC will be top dog. Starting at Durban, the trio find themselves ferrying a musical act to the highest pub in Africa, in Lesotho, where along the way they each set a fast lap on an improvised street circuit to see which SUV is fastest, race up a dirt track while carrying some large cocktails in their cars, and delicately film nature with the reversing cameras of the SUVs. The road trip ends with a race up a dirt track in the Drakensberg Mountains to see who can get to the pub first, with the winner's act performing, while the losers and their acts serve drinks and wash up. Meanwhile, Evans is on the track to try out the latest McLaren, the McLaren 675LT, while Damian Lewis finds himself competing against Sharleen Spiteri with setting a fast time in the Mini on the rallycross circuit. Note: Tinie Tempah was unavailable to be in the studio with the other musical acts from the 'Ultimate SUV' film, for unspecified reasons.
182	3	Audi R8 • Ferrari F12 TDF • SuperHatches: (Ford Focus RS • Honda Civic Type R • Mercedes AMG A45)	London tour in Ken Block's Hoonicorn	Ken Block • Anthony Joshua • Kevin Hart	12 June 2016	3.44
Evans tests out the new Audi R8 on the track before taking it to Laguna Seca to see how fast Schmitz is with it on two laps – one with the driving aids on, and one with them off. Meanwhile, Harris takes the new Ferrari F12 TDF for a test at Circuit Paul Ricard, Reid tries out the Ford Focus RS against its competitors in the cutthroat hot hatchback market, the Honda Civic Type R and the Mercedes AMG A45, while LeBlanc takes a tour of London with Ken Block and his Hoonicorn, and Anthony Joshua and Kevin Hart see which is the fastest on the rallycross circuit with the Mini.
183	4	Tesla Model X • Aston Martin Vulcan	Venice "cheap car vs. luxury train" race: (Jaguar XJ Exec • Honda Gold Wing • Audi A8)	Darren Turner • Tom Kerridge • Tom Kitchin • Ollie Dabbous • Oliver Peyton • India Fisher • Bear Grylls • Brian Cox	19 June 2016	3.22
In a two-day race from London to Venice, Jordan competes against three other presenters with the Venice-Simplon Orient Express, each of whom purchase a vehicle on a budget of £3,660, the price for a one-way ticket on the train - Evans uses a 2002 Jaguar XJ Exec, Schmitz gets a 2002 Audi A8, and LeBlanc opts for a 1989 Honda Gold Wing. While Jordan relaxes in comfort, the others tackle a tough race challenge, before seeing who can reach the finish line at a hotel. Elsewhere, Harris drives the Aston Martin Vulcan at the Yas Marina Circuit in Abu Dhabi, Reid heads to the US state of New York to see how good the Tesla Model X can be, and survival expert Bear Grylls pits himself against physicist Brian Cox, as they become the latest stars in the rallycross car.
184	5	BMW M2 • Zenos E10 S • Rolls-Royce Dawn • Jaguar F-Type SVR	Modern Rolls vs. Classic Rolls: People of Dingle vote on best: (Rolls-Royce Corniche • Rolls-Royce Dawn) • Delivering the F-Type SVR to the Geneva Motor Show	Jennifer Saunders • Paul Hollywood • Norman Dewis	26 June 2016	3.57
LeBlanc heads to Ireland to try out the latest offering from Rolls-Royce, the Rolls-Royce Dawn, to see how it looks, yet Evans thinks its too flashy like all new, moderns Rolls, so the presenters see what the people of Dingle will vote for – the Dawn or the 1976 Rolls-Royce Corniche. Elsewhere, Evans takes to the track to see how good the Zenos E10 S is, Harris tries out the BMW M2 to see if its worthy of being based on BMW's M Car, Reid recreates the journey of Jaguar's former chief test driver, Norman Dewis, by trying to get the Jaguar F-Type SVR Convertible to the Geneva Motor Show on time, and Jennifer Saunders discusses the new Absolutely Fabulous film while Paul Hollywood discusses his new cookbook, before the pair see who was fastest in the rallycross car.
185	6	Ford Mustang GT • Ford Mustang EcoBoost • Honda NSX • Porsche 911 R	Classic cars with modern technology (Aston Martin DB5 • Eagle E-Type • MGB Roadster)	Patrick Dempsey • Greg Davies	3 July 2016	2.64
Harris sees how good Honda has done with resurrecting a legend, with the brand new Honda NSX, while Reid heads to Scotland to try out the latest generation of Mustangs being released with right-hand drive – the Ford Mustang GT and the Ford Mustang EcoBoost. Elsewhere, LeBlanc gets his first chance on the test track by seeing how good the Porsche 911 R is against its rival, the Porsche 911 GT3 RS, Evans reveals the extensive costs involved in restoring British classics with modern technology, such as the Aston Martin DB5, the Jaguar E-Type, and the MGB Roadster, and Patrick Dempsey competes against comedian Greg Davies to see who was fastest in the Mini. Finally, as a series finale treat, all six presenters see if they can do better jumps than their celebrities on the rallycross circuit's jump, with the losers getting a soaking by the winner.

== Criticism and controversy ==
=== Cenotaph stunt filming ===
During filming of the 'Ken Block's Tour of London' film for the show, complaints were made that the show was being disrespectful when it was revealed that Ken Block performed doughnuts around the Cenotaph monument, while taking presenter Matt LeBlanc on a tour of London. Following the complaints, both Chris Evans and the BBC apologised greatly for the anger that it caused, stating that the monument was not intended to appear in the film. The filmed scene was cut from the segment when it was broadcast as part of the third episode of Series 23, which garnered approval by viewers on Twitter, although bosses on Top Gear later revealed that policing costs for the filmed scene were around £6,500. In an article for The Guardian, former Top Gear presenter James May commented that the controversial filming had been "ill-advised" and "unwise". Further investigation into the matter by the BBC Trust ended on 14 July 2016, despite complaints that the broadcaster had given people nothing more than a "cut and paste" apology.

=== Presenting style and behaviour of Chris Evans ===
During the earlier months of 2016, Evans' behaviour behind the scenes became a central focus by media websites and newspapers, who were quoted as claiming that he was "out of control" with the work of revamping the show. This came after Lisa Clark, an executive producer brought in to replace Andy Wilman following his resignation from Top Gear, quit the show in December 2015, a few months after being assigned to assist in the new format. Also leaving the show during this period were script editor Tom Ford and the then boss of BBC Two, Kim Shillinglaw. His behaviour was considered problematic, most particularly with Clark, after a source claimed that Evans felt undermined by her during a meeting he attended, when she pointed out that he still had more films to complete than just the one he had done with Jenson Button, while another source revealed that the choice of Matt LeBlanc being Evans' co-host was down to Clark and not Evans, who simply uttered when hearing the choice from her: "He's old hat, what do we want him for?" On his Twitter account, after hearing the news of Clark's sudden departure, comedian Bob Mortimer commented on whether Tony Hall would live up to a promise to clamp down on BBC stars that were abusing their power following the stories emerging on Evans' behaviour. Rumours also emerged that LeBlanc was clashing with his co-host behind the scenes because they did not get on well, to the point that he threatened to leave unless Evans went, but these were dismissed by him as being rubbish during an interview with Radio Times, who claimed they were made by the "ruthlessness" of British media.

During his tenure as a host for the show, Evans was criticised greatly by viewers and media critics for his "shouty" presenting style, which many viewers did not like, and the fact that he wore the same clothing during the studio segments of the series, which involved a yellow "Carfest" T-shirt that he wore on TFI Friday beneath a black top. In July 2016, having presented just one series of the show Evans stepped down from his presenting role on Top Gear posting on social media "Stepping down from Top Gear. Gave it my best shot but sometimes that's not enough.

== Reception ==
Feedback of Series 23 and the new, revamped format of Top Gear was mixed amongst viewers; while many praised the inclusion of Matt LeBlanc, Chris Harris, and Rory Reid, most gave negative tweets in regards to some of the changes made and of Chris Evans, widely deeming the new look as sub-standard. Newspapers and news media site were just as critical, focusing on the show's low Overnight figures, with some re-branding the show as "Flop Gear" due to the low ratings it got, although Evans rebutted their findings by stating that they were not taking into account the Catch-Up figures that would make up the overall ratings for the show, and that newspapers preferred "to live in the past" with their focus on Overnight numbers. Despite his defence, the show received fewer viewers throughout the series, with the final episode achieving overnight figures of around 1.9 million viewers, a new recorded low in the show's history compared to that made by an episode featuring the former hosts, which attracted 2.36 million on 15 June 2003.

Part of the problem with its viewing figures was attributed to it being broadcast at the same time as the UEFA Euro 2016 tournament; newspapers stated that viewers tended to focus more on live events, and UEFA was thus competing with Top Gear in attracting the young male demographic. Clashing with the tournament was unavoidable due to the show's finalised premiere date; initial plans were for it to premiere on 8 May 2016 with ten episodes, but delays in production and concerns on the length of the series, which would have caused it to clash with both Euro 2016 and the 2016 Summer Olympics, led to the date being pushed back to 22 May and the series revised to contain six episodes, before a further scheduling conflict emerged, when it was discovered that the new premiere date would lead to the show clashing with the first semi-final of the tenth series of ITV's Britain's Got Talent, forcing bosses of BBC Two to move back the premiere date a further week. The contributing factor of the final episode's low overnight figures was ITV's live broadcast of the Euro 2016 quarter-final match between France and Iceland on the same day; had England won against Iceland in their Round of 16 match, the BBC would have pushed the final episode to an earlier slot on 3 July.
