= Top Gear series 4 =

Top Gear
- Series 4
- Starring: Jeremy Clarkson; Richard Hammond; James May; The Stig
- No. of episodes: 10

Release
- Original network: BBC Two
- Original release: 9 May – 1 August 2004

Series chronology
- ← Previous; Series 3 Next → Series 5

Series 4 of Top Gear, a British motoring magazine and factual television programme, was broadcast in the United Kingdom on BBC Two during 2004, consisting of ten episodes between 9 May and 1 August; a compilation episode featuring the best moments of the series, titled "Best of Top Gear", was aired on 8 August. This series saw the introduction of elements that would become a key part of the programme's formats, including races and special motoring budget challenges.

This series' highlights included a fuel endurance test between London and Edinburgh, the first major race between a car and public transport, and the presenters conducting their first budget car challenge. After the series concluded, a special edition for Sport Relief, titled "Stars in Fast Cars", was aired on 1 August, which later spawned a spin-off series for the BBC.

== Episodes ==
No. overall	No. in series	Reviews	Features/challenges	Guest(s)	Original release date	UK viewers (millions)
30	1	Lotus Exige • Rover CityRover • Aston Martin DB9	Epic race: Aston Martin DB9 vs. Eurostar and TGV fast trains – Surrey to Monte Carlo • Apache Gunship helicopter vs. Lotus Exige – can the helicopter get missile lock? • James attempts to record a review of the CityRover during a test drive	Fay Ripley	9 May 2004	3.28
The presenters conduct a race to Monte Carlo, with Hammond and May travelling via the Eurostar and the TGV, and Clarkson racing against them in the Aston Martin DB9. Meanwhile, Clarkson sees if the super-lightweight Lotus Exige can evade missile lock-on from an Apache attack helicopter, and May goes undercover to see how rubbish the CityRover is. Finally, Fay Ripley steps in the Suzuki Liana to set a lap time on a mildly moist track.
31	2	Mercedes-Benz SLR McLaren • Alfa Romeo 166 • Cadillac Escalade • Ford FAB-1	A nun in a monster truck • Hammond gets hypnotised	Paul McKenna	16 May 2004	3.31
Clarkson reviews the Alfa Romeo 166 and the Mercedes-Benz SLR McLaren, while assessing how the Volvo XC90 compares with the Land Rover Discovery. Meanwhile, May takes a drive in the 2004 Thunderbirds movie version of FAB 1 to see how it fares on the road, and a nun attempts to prove they can drive a monster truck. Finally, hypnotist Paul McKenna has a go in the Liana before causing mischief for one of the presenters.
32	3	Porsche 911 GT3 RS • Ferrari 360 Challenge Stradale • Dodge Charger R/T	£100 car challenge. (Volvo 760 • Audi 80 • Rover 416GTi)	Jordan	23 May 2004	3.36
The presenters each buy a road-legal car for less than £100 - a Volvo 760, a Rover 416GTi and an Audi 80 1.8E - and put them through their paces with a series of challenges to see who got the better deal. Meanwhile, Hammond reviews the 1968 Dodge Charger 440 R/T, and Clarkson tries out the Porsche 996 GT3 RS against the Ferrari 360 Challenge Stradale with a track day. Finally, supermodel Jordan is the latest star in the Liana to do a lap.
33	4	Porsche Carrera GT • Audi A8 4.0 TDI • Ford SportKa	'Car darts' • Audi A8 4.0 TDI endurance challenge (London to Edinburgh and back on one tank) • Ford SportKa vs. racing pigeons • Evo vs. STi battle revised	Ronnie O'Sullivan	30 May 2004	3.24
Clarkson sees if an Audi A8 4.0 TDI can do a drive from London to Edinburgh and back on one tankful of fuel. Meanwhile, there is a race between the Ford SportKa and a flock of racing pigeons, a review of the Porsche Carrera GT, the Mitsubishi Lancer Evolution VIII MR FQ320 and the Subaru Impreza STI WRX WR1, and a game of "car darts" between Hammond and May. Finally, snooker player Ronnie O'Sullivan does a lap in the Liana.
34	5	MG ZT 260 • Hatchbacks: (Vauxhall Astra • Mazda3 • Volkswagen Golf)	Shootout: Performance sport coupes (Jaguar XK-R • BMW 645Ci • Porsche 911 Carrera 2) on the Pendine Sands • Volkswagen Golf gets electrocuted	Johnny Vaughan • Denise van Outen	6 June 2004	3.39
The trio head to Pendine Sands to conduct a comparison challenge between the BMW 645Ci, the Jaguar XK-R, and the Porsche 996 Carrera 2. Meanwhile, Hammond sees how a safe a car if it is struck by lightning, and there are reviews of the Vauxhall Astra, the Mazda 3, and the MG ZT 260. Finally, Johnny Vaughan is driving in the Liana this time, with Denise Van Outen tagging along.
35	6	Renault Clio RenaultSport • Jaguar XJS • Cadillac CTS • Nissan Cube	Can you run a car on poo? Hammond Investigates.	Sir Terry Wogan	13 June 2004	3.19
The presenters review two cars not available in Britain - the Nissan Cube, and the Cadillac CTS - and determine which other vehicles they want in the country. Meanwhile, May sees how a modernised version of the Jaguar XJS compares to the original, Clarkson reviews the Renault Clio 182, and Hammond sees if a car can run on "poo". Finally, broadcaster Terry Wogan sees whether he can be good around the track in the Liana.
36	7	Spyker C8 Spyder • Mercedes-Benz CL 65 AMG	MPVs as minicabs: (Renault Scénic • Ford C-Max)	Lionel Richie	11 July 2004	3.47
Clarkson pits the Mercedes-Benz CL 65 AMG in a drag race against the Bentley Continental GT and the Aston Martin DB9, before reviewing the Spyker C8 Spyder to see how good it drives. Elsewhere, Hammond and May test out the Renault Scénic and the Ford C-MAX with a unique challenge - to see how well they fare as minicabs. Finally, Lionel Richie breaks a wheel off the Liana when he takes to the track.
37	8	Ford GT • Maserati Quattroporte	Diesel versus Petrol hot hatch race • Blowing over cars using Boeing 747 jetblast • Tribute to the Rover V8 engine	Martin Clunes	18 July 2004	4.01
Hammond pays tribute to the Rover V8 engine, and tests a Boeing 747's engine jetblast against two unmanned cars - a Ford Mondeo and a Citroen 2CV. Meanwhile, Clarkson gets to grips with the Ford GT, May questions what type of car the Maserati Quattroporte wants to be, and a diesel Škoda Fabia VRS races against a petrol Mini Cooper. Finally, Martin Clunes takes the Liana around the track.
38	9	Two Seater Roadsters: (Mazda MX-5 • Toyota MR2 • Fiat Barchetta • Mercedes-Benz SL600) • Convertibles: (Mini Cooper Cabriolet • Vauxhall Tigra • Mercedes-Benz SLK350 • Audi S4 Cabriolet) • Jaguar X-Type Estate	Can you parachute into a moving car?	Sir Ranulph Fiennes	25 July 2004	4.01
There are comparison tests between two seater roadsters - the Mercedes-Benz SL600, the Mazda MX-5, the Fiat Barchetta and the Toyota MR2 - and between cabriolets - the Mini Cooper Cabriolet, the Vauxhall Tigra, the Mercedes-Benz SLK350, and the Audi S4 Cabriolet. Clarkson reviews the Jaguar X-Type estate, while May sees if you can parachute into a moving car. Finally, Sir Ranulph Fiennes tackles driving the Liana around the Test Track.
39	10	Volvo V50 • Peugeot 407 • BMW X3 • Chevrolet Corvette	Hammond drives the Peugeot 407 as a pace car	Patrick Kielty	1 August 2004	3.54
Hammond tests to see if the Peugeot 407 works a pace car, and compares the Chevrolet Corvette C6 to older models in the Corvette range. Meanwhile, May tests the boot space of the Volvo V50 by seeing what he can get into it from an antique sale and Clarkson reviews the BMW X3. Finally, Patrick Kielty sees if he can put in a fast lap with the Liana.

=== Spin-Off Special ===
Title	Guest(s)	Original air date
Stars in Fast Cars	Jodie Kidd, Patrick Kielty, Jimmy Carr and Darren Jordon	10 July 2004
Hammond and May host a special edition of Top Gear, in which several well-known celebrities take on each other in a series of challenges to see who is best. The show's competitors included Clarkson, Jodie Kidd, Patrick Kielty, Jimmy Carr and Darren Jordon.
