= Top Gear series 25 =

Top Gear
- Series 25
- Starring: Matt LeBlanc; Chris Harris; Rory Reid; Sabine Schmitz; Eddie Jordan; The Stig
- No. of episodes: 6

Release
- Original network: BBC Two
- Original release: 25 February – 1 April 2018

Series chronology
- ← Previous; Series 24 Next → Series 26

Series 25 of Top Gear, a British motoring magazine and factual television programme, was broadcast in the United Kingdom on BBC Two during 2018, consisting of six episodes between 25 February and 1 April. No changes were made to the line-up, which was considered an appropriate success to improving the programme, despite the series' viewing figures not averaging more than 3.15 million viewers. This series' highlights included a road trip across Japan in second-hand sports car, the presenters making their own home-made tractor, and a tribute to the Citroën 2CV.

== Production ==
On 26 April 2017, the controller of BBC Two, Patrick Holland, announced confirmation that the programme would be returning for a new series in 2018, following "healthier" viewing figures than those made from the twenty-third series. Holland revealed in his announcement, that Matt LeBlanc, Chris Harris and Rory Reid would return for their second consecutive series as the three main presenters, with Sabine Schmitz and Eddie Jordan to continue making occasional appearances. Holland attributed the success of the show's previous series to it being led by LeBlanc and making it his own, alongside the assistance of Harris and Reid, but stated there was no comparisons between this show and that presented by Clarkson, Hammond and May, stating that viewers were "looking at two completely different shows" in that regard.

Filming for the series was confirmed on 22 June 2017, beginning with the presenters heading to Norway to record footage for an upcoming episode. LeBlanc was later spotted filming new scenes for the series in the Isle of Man in October 2017.

== Episodes ==
No. overall	No. in series	Reviews	Features/challenges	Guest(s)	Original release date	UK viewers (millions)
193	1	None	Road trip across Utah's Wild West in V8 sports cars: (Hennessey Ford Shelby Mustang GT350 R • Jaguar F-Type SVR • McLaren 570GT)	Rob Brydon • Ken Block	25 February 2018	3.50
To celebrate the 116th Anniversary of the V8, the presenters head to Utah to see which of their brand new V8 sports cars is the best - LeBlanc believes his tuned Ford Shelby Mustang GT350 R is the likely winner, Reid proves his Jaguar F-Type SVR is the top car of the three, while Harris argues that the technical and practical McLaren 570GT is the finest of the lot. Travelling across the US state, the trio compare their cars in a series of challenges, culminating in a combined race against The Stig in a Ford GT40. Meanwhile, Rob Brydon proves he can be serious when he does a lap in the GT86.
194	2	McLaren 720S	720S v. McLaren P1 • Off road toys in California to find Bigfoot • Racing in Reverse	Lee Mack	4 March 2018	3.04
Hoping to prove that BigFoot exists, LeBlanc takes Harris with him to the Californian Woods to search for him, utilising a selection of brand-new off-road toys. Elsewhere, Harris tries out the new McLaren 720S in Portimao and then sees how it compares to its P1, before finding himself undergoing a new game made by Reid - "Racing in Reverse". Finally, Lee Mack attempts to see how fast he can drive the Reasonably Fast Car around the Test Track.
195	3	Lexus LC500 • Honda Civic Type R	Second-hand sports cars across Honshu: (Nissan Skyline GTT • Mazda RX-7) • Weirdest Japanese car culture	None	11 March 2018	2.93
Harris and LeBlanc are in Japan to see who can get the better deal at a Japanese car auction - Harris opts for a Mazda RX-7, while LeBlanc attempts to win with a Nissan Skyline GTT. To see which is the best, the pair engage in a series of tests with their cars involving sumo wrestlers, and a visit to the region surrounding the Fukushima Daiichi Nuclear Power Plant, before finding themselves racing to see which car will return to the UK. Meanwhile, Reid takes a look at the various forms of car culture within Japan, while Harris reviews the new Honda Civic Type R, and races it against The Stig's Japanese Cousin in a Lexus LC500.
196	4	Dodge Challenger Demon • Kia Stinger GT-S • Hyundai i30N	Harris' tribute to the Citroën 2CV	Dara Ó Briain • Ed Byrne	18 March 2018	3.26
Harris pays tribute to the Citroën 2CV by seeing how he can prove it was most important car ever made, despite the tests devised for it being made by LeBlanc. Meanwhile, Reid takes a look at some good Korean cars on the track - the Kia Stinger GT-S and the Hyundai i30N - while LeBlanc reviews the Dodge Challenger Demon and sees how useful it can be by undergoing a special challenge to assist NASA with a special project. Finally, comedian friends Dara Ó Briain and Ed Byrne compete to see who is faster in the GT86.
197	5	Ferrari 812 Superfast • Chevrolet Camaro ZL1 1LE	Building the world's fastest tractor	Vicky McClure	25 March 2018	2.97
Fed up with how slow tractors are on British roads, LeBlanc decides to show the world they can be made faster by building a new one - the "Trak-tor". Joined by Harris, the pair put LeBlanc's creation through its paces by seeing how fast it goes, and then taking on a series of farming-related tests. Meanwhile, Reid is joined by Sabine in his review of a muscle car banned from Europe, the Chevrolet Camaro ZL1 1LE, by seeing how fast it can be driven around Willow Springs International Motorsports Park, LeBlanc heads to Italy to celebrate Ferrari's 70th birthday by trying out the Ferrari 812 Superfast on the road and the Imola racetrack, while Vicky McClure is the latest star to have a go in the Reasonably Fast Car.
198	6	Alpine A110	Best Modern SUV: (Alfa Romeo Stelvio • Range Rover Velar • Volvo XC60)	Jason Manford	1 April 2018	2.97
The presenters head to Burghley House to put a series of modern SUVs through a special series of car-trails - LeBlanc believes it to be the fast and vibrant Alfa Romeo Stelvio, Harris opts for the sensible and practical Volvo XC60, and Reid chooses the stylish and capable Range Rover Velar. After each takes a turn in a special version of horse trialling, towing horseboxes, the trio finish with a race between their SUVs around the manor's grounds. Elsewhere Harris tests out the new Alpine A110 at the track, before heading out to the Monte-Carlo Rally with Eddie to put the car through its paces, while Jason Manford attempts to lap the reasonably fast GT86.
