= Extra Gear =

British online television series

- Genre: Motoring
- Created by: Chris Evans
- Directed by: Richard Down; Simon Staffurth; Toby Baker
- Presented by: Rory Reid; Chris Harris; George Lewis
- Country of origin: United Kingdom
- Original language: English
- No. of series: 4
- No. of episodes: 24

Production
- Executive producer: Martin Dance
- Producers: Richard Down; Stephanie Fox; Toby Brack
- Running time: 30 mins
- Production companies: BBC / BBC Studios; BBC America

Original release
- Network: BBC Three; BBC iPlayer; BBC Two (2017–2019)
- Release: 29 May 2016 – 17 March 2019

Related
- Top Gear

Top Gear: Extra Gear, known simply as Extra Gear, is a British online television series, broadcast by BBC Three, which is online only and is available on on-demand service BBC iPlayer in the United Kingdom; the series serves as a spin-off show to Top Gear. In the first series, the main presenters were Top Gear co-presenters Rory Reid and Chris Harris. After Reid and Harris were appointed as main presenters to the parent show, comedian George Lewis was announced as the new lead presenter for series 2. Following Lewis’ departure, Reid returned as the presenter of the show for the third series.

== Production ==
On 27 April 2016, it was announced that BBC Three had commissioned a spin-off programme to BBC Two motoring series Top Gear, entitled Extra Gear, presented by Top Gear co-presenter Rory Reid. The series is released online immediately following episodes from the twenty-third series of the main show, and features exclusive new footage, interviews, specially-recorded films and behind-the-scenes access to Top Gear.

Following his appointment, Reid stated that "Top Gear fans are some of the keenest in the world and with this show I’m giving them a chance to really get a peek behind the curtain. I’m looking forward to showing them how the show is made and what goes on behind the scenes, giving viewers a different perspective on some of the coolest cars on the planet." Reid won his place on the show after submitting a thirty-second audition video to a BBC open audition for the role.

On 24 May 2016, a behind-the-scenes trailer revealed that Reid would be joined by fellow Top Gear presenter Chris Harris, who would act as his co-presenter. Harris' addition was confirmed on 29 May 2016.

In 2017, the BBC announced following Harris and Reid's promotion to the main show, that comedian George Lewis would become the main presenter alongside the two. Reid would return, without Harris, for series 3.

After Series 4, the BBC confirmed that the show would not return.

== Episodes ==
Season	Episodes	Originally released		
Season	Episodes	First released	Last released	Network
1	6	May 29, 2016	June 3, 2016	BBC Three
2	7	March 5, 2017	May 23, 2017	BBC Three; BBC Two
3	6	February 25, 2018	April 1, 2018	BBC Three; BBC Two
4	5	February 17, 2019	March 17, 2019	BBC Three; BBC Two

=== Series 1 (2016) ===
Total	Episode	Reviews	Guest(s)	Original release date
1	1	Ariel Nomad • Mini Cooper • Porsche GT3R	Chris Evans • Sabine Schmitz • Chris Ramsey	29 May 2016
2	2	McLaren F1 • Volvo XC90 T8 • Glickenhaus P45C Competizione	Chris Evans • Stephen K. Amos • Eddie Jordan	5 June 2016
3	3	Audi R8 • Ferrari F12 TDF • Ford Focus RS • Mercedes AMG GTS • Hoonicorn	Sabine Schmitz • Zoe Lyons • Chris Evans • Matt LeBlanc • Ken Block	12 June 2016
4	4	Tesla Model X • Aston Martin V12 Vantage S	Eddie Jordan • Elis James • John Robins	19 June 2016
5	5	Rolls-Royce Dawn • Porsche 911 GT3 RS • Jaguar E-type	David Coulthard • Daniel Ricciardo • Norman Dewis • Chris Evans	26 June 2016
6	6	BMW i8	Sabine Schmitz • Matt LeBlanc	3 July 2016

=== Series 2 (2017) ===
Total	Episode	Reviews	Guest(s)	Original release date
7	1	Ferrari FXX-K • Volvo V60 Polestar	Frankie Dettori • Shazia Mirza • Max Whitlock • Jon Culshaw • Ore Oduba	5 March 2017
8	2	Alfa Giulia • BMW M3 Competition Package	David Tennant	12 March 2017
9	3	Aston Martin DB11 • Ford Fiesta • Toyota GT-86	Sabine Schmitz • Tamsin Greig	19 March 2017
10	4	Renault Twingo GT • Bentley Mulsanne Speed	Sabine Schmitz • Tinie Tempah	26 March 2017
11	5	Ford GT • Hammer Kings	Sabine Schmitz • Eddie Jordan • Chris Hoy	2 April 2017
12	6	Mercedes-AMG GT R • Nissan GT-R Nismo	Ross Noble	16 April 2017
13	7	Porsche 718 Cayman S • Avtoros Shaman • Audi TT RS	Jay Kay	23 April 2017

=== Series 3 (2018) ===
Total	Episode	Reviews	Guest(s)	Original release date
14	1	Mk1 GT40 • Vauxhall VXR8 GTS R	John Hennessey • Sabine Schmitz • Jackie Oliver	25 February 2018
15	2	McLaren 720S • McLaren 570S Spider	Marino Franchitti • Rob Bell	4 March 2018
16	3	Nissan Fairlady Z432 • Nissan 370Z NISMO	Jann Mardenborough • Matt Richardson	11 March 2018
17	4	Kia Stinger • Hyundai i30 • Citroen 2CV	Colin Turkington • Brennan Reece	18 March 2018
18	5	Lamborghini Countach • Chevrolet Camaro ZL1 1LE • Porsche 911 GT3	Alex Kersten • Mark Wynne	25 March 2018
19	6	Division 1 Superkart	Craig Breen • Enaam Ahmed	1 April 2018

=== Series 4 (2019) ===
Total	Episode	Reviews	Guest(s)	Original release date
20	1	Suzuki Ignis • Porsche Panamera Turbo S Sport Turismo	Jonny Smith • Duncan Barbour	17 February 2019
21	2	Ford Focus RS • Mercedes-Benz E63 AMG S • Jaguar XJR 575	Paul Wallace • Henry Catchpole • Paul "Smokey" Smith	24 February 2019
22	3	Bentley Continental GT	David Brabham • David Lapworth • Akira Nakai	3 March 2019
23	4	Team BRIT Fun Cup Beetle	Bruno Senna • Al Locke • Ash Hall	10 March 2019
24	5	Lamborghini Aventador S • Audi R8 V10 RWS	Kevin Eriksson • Vicky Parrott	17 March 2019

== Broadcast ==
In the United States, Extra Gear is presented on BBC America immediately following the first airing of Top Gear. In Australia, the show is available (not broadcast) on on-demand service 9Now.

From series 2 onwards, reruns are broadcast on BBC Two, the broadcaster of parent show Top Gear.
