= Top Gear series 3 =

Top Gear
- Series 3
- Starring: Jeremy Clarkson; Richard Hammond; James May; The Stig
- No. of episodes: 9

Release
- Original network: BBC Two
- Original release: 26 October – 28 December 2003

Series chronology
- ← Previous; Series 2 Next → Series 4

Series 3 of Top Gear, a British motoring magazine and factual television programme, was broadcast in the United Kingdom on BBC Two during 2003, consisting of nine episodes between 26 October and 28 December; a compilation episode featuring the best moments of the series, titled "Best of Top Gear", was aired on 4 January 2004.

This series saw racing driver Ben Collins replace Perry McCarthy - which included a change of clothing to create White Stig - with McCarthy performing his last role in the first episode. It is also notable for a feature involving the fourth generation Toyota Hilux being put through a series of destructive tests of its engineering strength; this later garnered criticism from a local council for the damage it caused during filming of the segment. For this series the insider dealing segment seen in the first two series was dropped with further emphasis placed on challenge segments.

== Episodes ==
No. overall	No. in series	Reviews	Features/challenges	Guest(s)	Original release date	UK viewers (millions)
21	1	Ford GT • BMW 5 Series • Porsche 911 GT3	Can the diesel Volkswagen Lupo get better mpg than the petrol version? • Can The Stig reach 100 mph on an aircraft carrier?	Martin Kemp	26 October 2003	3.32
Clarkson reviews the heavily anticipated Ford GT against its competitors in Detroit, before racing a diesel Volkswagen Lupo against its petrol version on fuel economy with a lap of the M25. Hammond tests out the Porsche 911 GT3, May reviews the BMW 5 Series, and singer Martin Kemp performs a lap in the Liana. Finally, the Stig attempts to reach 100mph in the programme's modified Jaguar XJS on board HMS Invincible with disastrous results. Note: The final appearance of the original Stig, portrayed by Perry McCarthy, was a scripted scene by the production staff.
22	2	BMW M3 CSL • BMW M1 • BMW M3 • BMW M5 •	Volvo 240 attempts to jump four caravans • Best 2 seater sportscar: (Porsche Boxster • BMW Z4 • Honda S2000)	Stephen Fry	2 November 2003	3.41
The trio head to the Isle of Man to compare three old BMW sports cars, as well as find the best three two seater convertibles - the BMW Z4, the Porsche Boxster and the Honda S2000. Elsewhere, the BMW M3 CSL is road-tested before Top Gear's new White Stig puts in a power lap with it, while a Volvo 240 tries to jump five caravans side-by-side. Finally, Stephen Fry talks about his London Taxi before seeing how he fared in the Liana.
23	3	Bentley Continental GT • Subaru Legacy Outback	Saab 9-5 Aero versus a BAe Sea Harrier • How to Escape from a Sinking Car • Top Gear Survey	Rob Brydon	9 November 2003	4.02
Hammond investigates the dangers of being in a car that is sinking in water and the best way to escape such a scenario. Meanwhile, Clarkson reviews the Bentley Continental GT and Saab 9-5 Aero, the latter raced by Stig against a Harrier jump jet, May questions if the aristocracy will go for the Subaru Legacy Outback, and the results of Top Gear Survey are unveiled. Finally, Rob Brydon becomes the first Welshman to do a lap in the Liana.
24	4	Lamborghini Miura • Lamborghini Countach • Mini Cooper S Works • Lamborghini Gallardo	Lamborghini Tribute	Rich Hall	16 November 2003	4.59
To celebrate the 40th anniversary of the Lamborghini, the presenters take a look back at some classics - the 1967 Lamborghini Miura, an improved 1971 SV, and the Lamborghini Countach - while Clarkson road tests the Lamborghini Gallardo. Elsewhere, Hammond reviews several versions of the Mini Cooper S, while American comedian Rich Hall sees how he fares in the reasonably priced car.
25	5	Mazda RX-8 • Fiat Panda	Is the Toyota Hilux really indestructible? • Hammond searches for future classic cars	Simon Cowell	23 November 2003	4.80
Clarkson determines how tough a Toyota Hilux pick-up truck truly is by putting it through a series of destructive tests around Bristol and the Test Track. Meanwhile, there are reviews of the Mazda RX-8, may takes the Fiat Panda for a drive in Hertfordshire, while Hammond looks up potential future 'classic' cars. Finally, Simon Cowell judges how well he fared in a lap with the Liana.
26	6	Citroën C2 • Renault Mégane CC • Peugeot 307 CC • Aston Martin V8 Vantage (1977) • Holden Monaro	Is a Toyota Hilux really indestructible? – Part 2	Sanjeev Bhaskar	7 December 2003	5.40
May continues Clarkson's testing of the Toyota Hilux's toughness by seeing if it can survive on top of a tower block due for demolition. Meanwhile, Hammond reviews the Renault Mégane CC and the Peugeot 307 CC convertibles, Clarkson tests out the Citroën C2 and the Holden Monaro, and May tries out the Aston Martin V8 Vantage. Finally Sanjeev Bhaskar is the latest star to drive in the reasonably priced car.
27	7	MG XPower SV • Porsche Cayenne Turbo • Mercedes-Benz SLR McLaren	Which professor can do the best burn-out • What is the best British car: (Rover 75 • Morgan Plus 8 • Noble M12)	Rory Bremner	14 December 2003	3.35
The trio argue over which British car is the best in their eyes from amongst the Noble M12, the Morgan Plus 8 and the Rover 75. Meanwhile, Clarkson reviews the unimpressive MG XPower SV and tests the off-road abilities of the Porsche Cayenne Turbo, Hammond road tests the Mercedes-Benz SLR McLaren in South Africa, and three professors compete in a burn-out contest. Finally, comic impersonator Rory Bremner does a lap in the Liana.
28	8	Mercedes-Benz 280SL • Nissan Micra • Aston Martin Lagonda • Audi TT	Top Gear Generation Game	Johnny Vegas	21 December 2003	3.15
Hammond and Clarkson argue over modern cars and classic cars and settle the matter with a drag-out drag race between five of each group. Meanwhile, there are reviews of the Nissan Micra and the Audi TT V6, an investigation into car design with a '60s Mercedes-Benz 280SL, and May drives the bold 1970s Aston Martin Lagonda. Finally, comedian Johnny Vegas proves he can drive fast in the Liana without a driving licence.
29	9	Chrysler Crossfire • Smart Roadster (Brabus V6 Bi-Turbo) • Jaguar XJ6 • Honda Civic Type R • Honda NSX Type R	Top Gear Awards 2003	Carol Vorderman	28 December 2003	4.24
With the budget exhausted for the final episode, the trio shoulder on by conducting reviews of the Chrysler Crossfire, a Smart Roadster Brabus V6 Bi-Turbo, the Honda Civic Type-R, the Honda NSX Type R, and the Jaguar XJ6. Meanwhile, the presenters hosts the Top Gear Awards for 2003, and Carol Vorderman sees if she can be fast when she does a lap in the Liana.

== Best-of episodes ==
Total	No.	Title	Feature	Original air date
S2	CE	The Best of Top Gear: 2003	Best moments from Series 3	4 January 2004
A look back at some of the best moments from Series 3, including how much was done to the Indestructible Toyota Hilux, and the demise of the Original Stig.

== Criticism ==
Following the broadcast of the fifth episode of the 3rd series, the BBC was contacted by the Churchill Parish in Somerset in regards to the tree that featured in the segment where Clarkson was proving the sturdiness and reliability of the Toyota Hilux. Up until the episode had been broadcast, villagers had presumed that the damage had been done accidentally or by vandals, until they watched what had happened on the show. After the BBC was contacted, the director of Top Gear admitted guilt and the broadcaster paid compensation.
