= Aurora Mulligan =

Irish television producer

- Born: 1984 (age 41–42)
- Education: University of Liverpool
- Occupations: Television producer; director

Aurora Mulligan (born 1984) is an Irish television producer and director. She is known for her work on Top Gear.

== Early life and education ==
Mulligan grew up in County Fermanagh, Northern Ireland. She studied politics and political philosophy at the University of Liverpool.

== Career ==
Mulligan was a producer for the BBC and in 2015 became the first female producer on its long running motoring show Top Gear. Later, she joined the cast of the programme and took on the role of a bride whose wedding at St Paul's Cathedral was crashed.

In 2016, Mulligan produced a segment in the Isle of Man in which an eight-wheeled all-terrain vehicle rescued some naked ramblers. In 2018, Mulligan moved to Los Angeles and joined Lionsgate's Pilgrim Studios as the executive director of documentaries.

In 2019, Mulligan worked on the 100th Isle of Man TT Races.

Previously, Mulligan was a producer at Big Earth Productions, a production company known for producing travel series Long Way Round and Long Way Down. Mulligan also worked as an assistant director on EastEnders, Holby City, and The Bill. She specialises in car and motorbike-related programming.

== Personal life ==
Mulligan was in a relationship with American TV actor Matt LeBlanc for six years until 2022.

In 2021, an internet meme known as Irish Uncle went viral and it was widely reported that Mulligan's influence was responsible for the look.

== Filmography ==
- Top Gear
- Long Way Round
- Long Way Down
- EastEnders
- Holby City
- The Bill
