= The Stig =

Driver in TV motoring show Top Gear

- Top Gear character
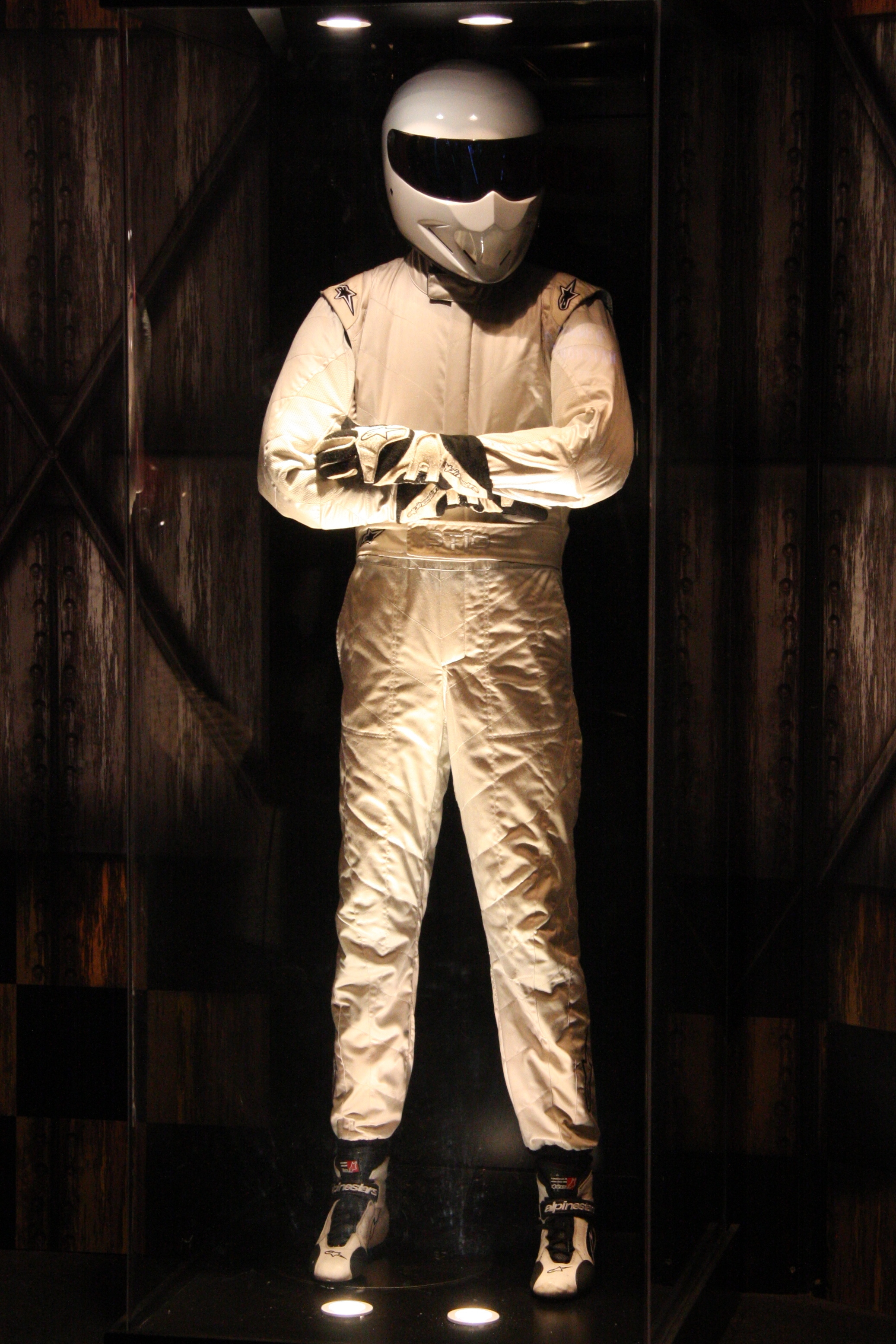
- The Stig costume on display at the National Motor Museum, Beaulieu
- First appearance: 20 October 2002
- Created by: Andy Wilman; Jeremy Clarkson
- Portrayed by: Perry McCarthy (2002–2003); Ben Collins (2003–2010); Phil Keen (2010–2019); Paul Rees (2019-2022)

In-universe information
- Occupation: Test driver and trainer for celebrity guests

The Stig is a character from the British motoring television show Top Gear. Created by former Top Gear presenter Jeremy Clarkson and producer Andy Wilman, the character is a play on the anonymity of racing drivers' full-face helmets, with the running joke that nobody knows who or what is inside the Stig's racing suit. The Stig's primary role is setting lap times for cars tested on the show. Previously, he would also instruct celebrity guests, off-camera, for the show's "Star in a Reasonably Priced Car" segment.

The identity of the original "Black" Stig, Perry McCarthy, was exposed by a Sunday newspaper in January 2003, and confirmed by McCarthy later that year. The black-suited Stig was subsequently "killed off" that October in the series 3 premiere, and replaced in the following episode by a new White Stig who lasted through to the end of series 15.

In series 13 episode 1, the show jokingly unmasked the Stig as seven-time world champion F1 driver Michael Schumacher. In the hiatus following series 15, racing driver Ben Collins was revealed to be the Stig in a court battle over Collins's impending autobiography, titled The Man in the White Suit. In series 16, debuting in December 2010, Collins was replaced by a second White Stig, who was revealed by Clarkson in 2024 to be racing driver Phil Keen. Keen left the role in 2019; racing driver Paul Rees revealed in 2026 that he played the third White Stig from 2019 until the show's indefinite hiatus in 2022.

== Creation and name ==
The idea for the character was part of former host Jeremy Clarkson and former producer Andy Wilman's concept for the relaunched Top Gear show, bringing a new format to the original version of Top Gear which ceased production in 2001. The relaunched show introduced a live studio audience, the Stig, a racetrack, and madcap stunts. Clarkson is credited with having come up with the original idea for the Stig.

Clarkson and Wilman wanted to have a professional racing driver as part of the show's cast, but ran into difficulty finding a driver sufficiently adept at speaking on-camera. Clarkson then asked Wilman why the driver needed to speak at all, and they decided that the Stig's role would be silent.

The name Stig derives from Wilman and Clarkson's time at Repton School, where new boys had always been called "Stig". "Stig" is a pejorative referring to someone from a poor background with a poor dress sense (originating from the eponymous character in the children's book Stig of the Dump).

According to the original Stig, Perry McCarthy, speaking in 2006, the producers had first wanted the anonymous driver to be called "The Gimp", referring to the use of gimp suits in BDSM sexual role-playing. After McCarthy objected, they settled upon the name Stig. McCarthy had said of the idea at the time that "I don't want to be forever remembered as the Gimp". This was later confirmed by Andy Wilman.

== Characteristics ==
=== Anonymity and silence ===
When introducing the Stig in the Top Gear premiere, Clarkson said, "We don't know its name, we really don't know its name, nobody knows its name, and we don't want to know, because it's a racing driver."

According to a 2006 article in The Sunday Times, most of the Top Gear crew did not know the Stig's identity; one camera assistant reportedly observed the Stig eating his lunch in the back of an ambulance to avoid being spotted. In 2009, another Times article reiterated that only a few production staff, the show's presenters and other BBC journalists knew the Stig's true identity.

Former Stig Perry McCarthy described in 2009 how, to maintain his anonymity, he would put on the Stig's helmet while going through the Top Gear security gates, and then change into his racing overalls in a special room behind the gatehouse before driving into the studio areas. He would speak as little as possible in the backstage areas, and put on an accent which some mistook as French. McCarthy also explained that hiding his identity while coaching the celebrities for "Star in a Reasonably Priced Car" proved difficult. He said that he did reveal his true identity while coaching Ross Kemp and David Soul, as he had previously known them and they promised that they would be silent about his role. For other drives, if celebrities asked if he was a particular person, he would just say "How did you know?", adding that more often than not, the suggestion was Michael Schumacher.

The Stig is never shown talking on screen, although he does talk with celebrities off-camera while training them to drive around the track. Clarkson has joked that he is "not a very talkative chap". When asked about his identity in a rare spoken interview for the show Veronica Vibes of a Dutch channel, the Stig reportedly said, "I don't remember; my memory was erased when I got the job." The Stig's muteness has extended to appearances in other media, such as the "Brain Stig" video released by the BBC on YouTube in 2009.

Clarkson has written in his newspaper column that the Stig is not permitted to talk or comment on the cars he is given to drive because "the opinions of all racing drivers are completely worthless", going on to explain that, because of their familiarity with cars equipped for track racing, racing drivers believe any and all road cars are inferior to racing cars.

=== Driving ability ===
The show has often compared the Stig's driving ability to others, particularly Formula One drivers. When Jeremy Clarkson said that the Stig believed that the Suzuki Liana, the show's Reasonably Priced Car at the time, could do a lap time of 1:44.0, former F1 driver Nigel Mansell, appearing as a guest on the programme, duly obliged by posting a time of 1:44.6; the Stig then posted a time of 1:44.4. After Rubens Barrichello became the first person to beat the Stig's time (coming in at 1:44.3), the show repeatedly referred to a jealous rivalry between the Stig and Barrichello. Sebastian Vettel then further beat this time by posting a time of 1:44.0. A while later, Lewis Hamilton did a second lap and got a 1:42.9. Clarkson has often mentioned that F1 drivers seem to take a different racing line on the test track than the Stig, such as on Jenson Button's drive; however, during Barrichello's and Lewis Hamilton's visits to the show, Clarkson observed that they took the same line around the track as The Stig. F1 driver Mark Webber's appearance on the show was marked at the conclusion of his lap with Clarkson presenting him with an "I AM THE STIG" T-shirt.

=== Introductions ===
The Stig's introductions on the show have underlined his in character oddness. Initially the presenters heralded his appearance with simple humorous introductions, such as "His Holiness, the Stig!" Beginning in series 6, the introductions followed a format of, "Some say that [two bizarre characteristics]. All we know is, he's called the Stig.” Some introductions referred to current events and stories in popular culture relevant to the time of recording.

=== Other characteristics ===
Richard Porter, Top Gear's script editor, described the in universe persona of the Stig as "single minded, stubborn and hilariously petulant; specifically, a mix of Kimi Räikkönen, the keyboard player from Pet Shop Boys, and a 15-year-old boy forced to go on holiday with his parents."

In 2008, the Stig appeared in character at the National Television Awards, where he silently accepted an award and handed award presenter Griff Rhys Jones a letter from the Top Gear hosts, which instructed Jones 'to give the Stig the award in his left hand, as his right one is magnetic, and cautioning organisers that he wasn't to be seated near the cast of Coronation Street, as he's decided all northerners are edible'. This was in keeping with the Stig in universe character.

== Role ==
In the Top Gear end credits, the Stig is credited alongside Jeremy Clarkson, Richard Hammond, and James May as a presenter. The Stig's primary role on the show is at the Top Gear test track at the show's base at Dunsfold Aerodrome, Surrey. His two main functions are to post lap times for featured performance cars in the "Power Laps" segment, and to train celebrity guests to set lap times in the "Star in a Reasonably Priced Car" segment,

The Top Gear website described the Stig's test-driving role as follows:

When first introduced, the Stig was described as the resident test driver, as the presenters could not consistently post fast times themselves. His stated mission was to "just go out there and drive fast". The original Stig, Perry McCarthy, described in 2006 how a racing driver was intended to be used as part of the presenting team in order to produce definitive fastest lap times for tested cars.

== Identity ==
- Perry McCarthy – (2002–2003)
- Ben Collins – (2003–2010)
- Phil Keen – (2010–2019)
- Paul Rees – (2019–2022)

=== Black Stig / Perry McCarthy (2002-2003) ===
The Stig (Black)
- Top Gear character
- Portrayed by: Perry McCarthy, occasionally others
- Duration: 2002–2003
- First appearance: 20 October 2002 (Series 1; Episode 1)
- Last appearance: 26 October 2003 (Series 3; Episode 1)

Racing driver Perry McCarthy appeared in 22 Top Gear episodes as the black-suited, original Stig.

McCarthy was cast as the Stig following a chance meeting with Jeremy Clarkson at the 2002 launch party for McCarthy's autobiography, Flat Out, Flat Broke: Formula 1 the Hard Way!. This led to an audition as a regular presenter, before the production team decided the racing driver would be anonymous. (Contradicting this, McCarthy said in 2008 that Clarkson had mentioned the idea of a "top secret" racing driver at their first meeting.)

After the first series ended, an article in The Sunday Mirror on 12 January 2003 named McCarthy as the Stig. The newspaper quoted a show insider as saying, "Just a handful of the crew know that he is actually Perry." McCarthy responded at the time, "I do know who the Stig is but I cannot comment any further." After the second series ended, McCarthy published the second edition of his autobiography, in which he confirmed that he was the Stig. McCarthy was then "killed off" in the first episode of the third series.

The scene which saw Black Stig "killed off", nicknamed "Top Gun vs Top Gear", was an attempt to race to 100 mph (160 km/h) and then come to a halt on the 200-metre (660 ft) long flight deck of HMS Invincible, a Royal Navy aircraft carrier on which British Aerospace Sea Harrier jump jets reach 100 mph (160 km/h) before take-off. He would be using the "old Top Gear Jag", a white Jaguar XJS bought for a "couple of hundred quid", stripped of its fittings and fitted with nitrous injection to take it to 500 bhp (370 kW). The Stig accelerated along the deck, and an on-screen speedometer indicated 109 mph (175 km/h) before a cutaway shot saw the car flying off the end of the runway ramp and into the sea. Clarkson then revealed in the last scene of the episode that a glove floating on the sea was all that divers had found. According to McCarthy, "We tried to make it as much like a scene out of James Bond as possible."

The explanations for McCarthy's exit vary. While McCarthy described the parting as amicable in 2008, The Times claimed in 2009 that he had fallen out with producers. In 2010, McCarthy said he had become tired of the job, which he claimed paid £700 a week, and that part of his annoyance stemmed from an attempt by a car owner to sue him for ruining his car and the BBC's refusal to defend him due to his anonymity. He said the BBC chose not to renew his contract and had him written out of the show.

Although McCarthy said in 2006 that, following his exit from Top Gear, he harboured ambitions of re-entering racing in the Grand Prix Masters series, he went on to run an investment company and appear as an after-dinner speaker.

According to The Sunday Times, writing in 2009, McCarthy revealed in his book that there had always been more than one Stig, and that then 47-year-old Julian Bailey, a former Formula One driver, had acted as a stand-in for McCarthy.

=== First White Stig / Ben Collins (2003-2010) ===
The First White Stig
- Top Gear character
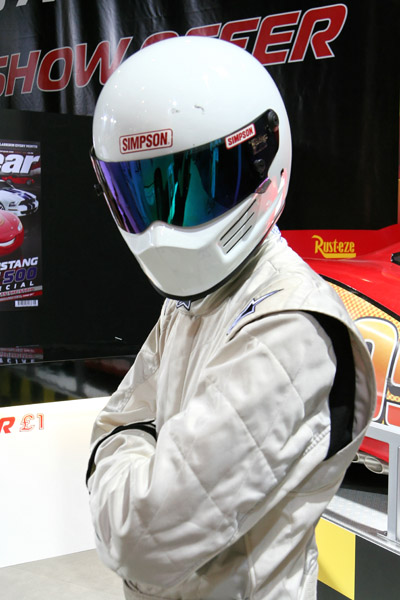
- The First White Stig in 2006
- Portrayed by: Ben Collins, occasionally others
- Duration: 2003–2010
- First appearance: 2 November 2003 (Series 3; Episode 2)
- Last appearance: 1 August 2010 (Series 15; Episode 6)

The first White Stig was introduced in November 2003, following the Black Stig's exit in the prior episode. His identity remained secret until it was revealed as Ben Collins in August 2010. During this Stig's time on the show, the character's role expanded from Power Lap times and "Reasonably Priced Car" training to include appearances in other show segments, such as producing timed runs in the Isle of Man road test; driving a Caterham Seven from Caterham to Knockhill; riding a London Bus, the DLR and the Tube across London; jumping a snowmobile off a ski-jump in Lillehammer, Norway; and playing a police pursuit driver in the White Van Man challenge.

==== Speculation ====
After the White Stig's debut, there was widespread speculation over his identity. Various sources claimed him to be a number of different racing drivers, including Collins, Damon Hill, Julian Bailey, Russ Swift, Darren Turner and Tim Schrick, as well as former Top Gear presenter Tiff Needell. Several people, including Hill and musician Jay Kay, claimed to be the Stig themselves. It was also speculated that the Stig was played by multiple drivers, a theory hinted at by original Stig Perry McCarthy. After observing the Stig's charity drive around the Silverstone Circuit just before the July 2008 British Grand Prix, former Formula One World Champion Fernando Alonso remarked, "Whoever's in that car is a seriously good driver. ... I've no idea who he is, but he's definitely ex-F1."

In January 2009, rumours about the Stig's identity were stoked, in part by a News of the World article alleging to have discovered the Stig to be a married man in his 30s, living in a £300,000 home and driving a £15,000 car, on an income of around £150,000 from his Top Gear job and some stunt and test driving. In the same month, an art gallery owner reported that the Stig had revealed his identity to the gallery owner and his son, after contracting with them (under the guise of a BBC executive) for a series of signed and limited prints of the Stig. In the latter instance, the Stig was alleged to be Ben Collins. It was also reported that a builder doing work at Collins's home had found the Stig's trademark suit and gloves on display there.

As these rumours were ongoing, the Top Gear blog published three entries on 21 January revealing the Stig to be, respectively, Damon Hill's deceased father Graham Hill; Royal Bank of Scotland chairman Sir Tom McKillop; and newly inaugurated U.S. president Barack Obama.

When Richard Hammond crashed a jet-powered car, the accident report into the crash described Ben Collins as someone "who worked closely with Top Gear as a high performance driver and consultant".

==== Michael Schumacher ====
On 20 June 2009, Clarkson announced in his newspaper column that the Stig would show his face in Top Gear's series thirteen premiere, airing the next day. According to Clarkson, the Stig was "fed up with newspapers speculating that he's a photocopier salesman from Bolton, or lives in a pebble-dashed house in Bristol".

The episode showed the Stig driving a black Ferrari FXX around the test track for a record-setting time of 1:10.7 (which was later disqualified as an official lap because it was driven on slicks), before walking into the studio and sitting down. As the audience shouted "Off! Off!" the Stig removed his helmet to reveal himself as seven-time world champion F1 driver Michael Schumacher. In the subsequent interview, Schumacher exhibited some of the Stig's supposedly defining character traits, such as knowing only two facts about ducks (both "facts" being wrong).

Following the revelation, the Stig alleged to be Schumacher was shown driving the Suzuki Liana but did not set a lap time; instead, video clips showed the Stig exhibiting very poor car control, striking a camera tripod, and eventually getting lost. Clarkson closed the segment by observing that possibly, Schumacher was not truly the Stig after all. While the BBC initially would not confirm whether Schumacher's revelation was a stunt, The Telegraph reported the next day that a Top Gear spokesman confirmed Schumacher had played the Stig, due to Ferrari only allowing Schumacher to drive the FXX, but that "the identity of the driver at other times would remain 'a mystery'."

==== The Man in the White Suit ====
On 19 August 2010, it was reported that a legal dispute was developing between the BBC and publishers representing the Stig, over plans by the Stig to release an autobiography revealing his identity. A BBC spokesman said, "The BBC is in a legal dispute over the publication of a book relating to Top Gear as this breaches agreed contractual and confidentiality obligations relating to the show." The Stig was reportedly unhappy that he had been unable to profit from his Top Gear role to the same degree as the other presenters.

Around the same time, The Sunday Times claimed that financial documents for Ben Collins's company, Collins Autosport, provided evidence that he was the Stig. The Times stated that beginning a month after the White Stig's first appearance, the company had experienced an increase in profits ascribed to "driving services provided for the BBC, mainly in the Top Gear programme." Collins did not comment on this story; the BBC said it was "no surprise" as Collins had appeared several times on the show as well as provided other services.

On 23 August 2010, the BBC and the Stig's publisher, HarperCollins, appeared in court. HarperCollins confirmed that it was being sued by the BBC over the autobiography's publication, stating, "We are disappointed that the BBC has chosen to spend licence fee payers' money to suppress this book and will vigorously defend the perfectly legitimate right of this individual to tell his story." The BBC said, "This situation has come about as a result of an attempt by an external party to profit from unauthorised use of the Top Gear brand, one of the BBC's biggest and most watched shows in the UK and around the world. As a result, it is important that the BBC does all it can to uphold confidentiality clauses that have been agreed to in relation to the show."

In a 27 August 2010 entry on the Top Gear blog, executive producer Andy Wilman attacked HarperCollins for attempting to reveal the Stig's identity: "The whole point of the Stig is the mystique – the bizarre characteristics he has, the wonderment created about what he might think, feel, do or look like. ... HarperCollins have decided none of that is as important as their profits." He also clarified that half of the BBC's legal costs were being funded by BBC Worldwide, their commercial arm.

On 29 August, the Daily Mirror claimed that photos of Collins at his England home on the same day that the Stig had appeared at a Top Gear event in Germany proved that Collins had already been fired from the Stig role. When asked about the ongoing High Court action, Collins stated, "I am not allowed to talk about it."

On 1 September 2010, the case was decided against the BBC, as the High Court refused to grant an injunction blocking the publication of the autobiography now acknowledged to be authored by Collins. Collins was in court for part of that day's hearing, but neither he nor the BBC confirmed afterward that he was the Stig; a BBC spokesman said, "The BBC brought this action as we believe it is vital to protect the character of The Stig, which ultimately belongs to the licence-fee payer. Today's judgment does not prevent the BBC from pursuing this matter to trial and it will not be deterred from protecting such information from attack no matter when or by whom it should arise." On 3 September 2010, the BBC News website published a profile of Collins that began: "Former Formula Three driver Ben Collins has won a legal fight to publish an autobiography in which he claims to be The Stig."

Collins's book, The Man in the White Suit, was published on 16 September 2010.

==== Aftermath ====
Immediately following the High Court's decision, Top Gear presenter James May commented, "Obviously I'm now going to have to take some legal action of my own, because I have been the Stig for the past seven years, and I don't know who this bloke is, who's mincing around in the High Court pretending it's him." He expounded on the pretence in a newspaper column the next day, describing his dual life as the Stig and "Captain Slow".

Speculation about the future of the Stig character began immediately. On 3 September 2010, May told a radio show that the Stig would be "dealt with" in a similar manner to how the Black Stig was eliminated. On the same day, The Telegraph reported that the BBC would not be renewing Collins's contract and that Collins would be soliciting offers to star in his own programme. (A month later, he joined the show Fifth Gear for its eighteenth series; he then became a co-presenter on the Polish programme Automaniak.) Clarkson advertised for a new driver in his 4 September newspaper column, noting the successful applicant must know that "no one, under any circumstances, should ever rat on their friends". In a 7 September interview, Clarkson said that Collins was "history as far as we are concerned. He's sacked."

Bookmakers' favourites to become the new Stig included Anthony Davidson, Damon Hill, Russ Swift, Heikki Kovalainen, and an unspecified female driver.

On 1 October 2010, it was announced that Collins would join Five's Fifth Gear motoring show, where he was introduced by Vicki Butler-Henderson as someone whose name "rhymes with The Twig". Collins appeared unmasked, saying "Yes, I can speak. It's a massive pleasure to do so."

On 5 November 2010, the Top Gear website released a video clip about its "Stig Farm", the end of which introduced a new Stig for the travelling stage show Top Gear Live. The video also featured a Stig attempting to write a book on a computer, and correcting one of its many mistakes with Tippex.

In the "USA Road Trip" special (debuting 21 December 2010), the presenters branded the Stig a traitor; May declared his true name to be Judas Iscariot. In a challenge mimicking a drive-by shooting, the targets used were cardboard representations of the Stig (with Hammond taking special care to shoot the Stig in the back).

During Collins's appearance with a military amputees rally team, broadcast in July 2011, he was introduced by Hammond as "romantic novelist and ex-Stig, Ben Collins". Collins returned to Top Gear in the series 18 special "50 Years of Bond Cars", where Hammond interviewed him on his work as a stunt driver in the film Skyfall. Hammond again introduced him as an ex-Stig and referred several times during the interview to Collins's departure. Collins wore a T-shirt during the interview which read "I am the Stig."

=== Second White Stig / Phil Keen (2010-2019) ===
The Second White Stig
- Top Gear character
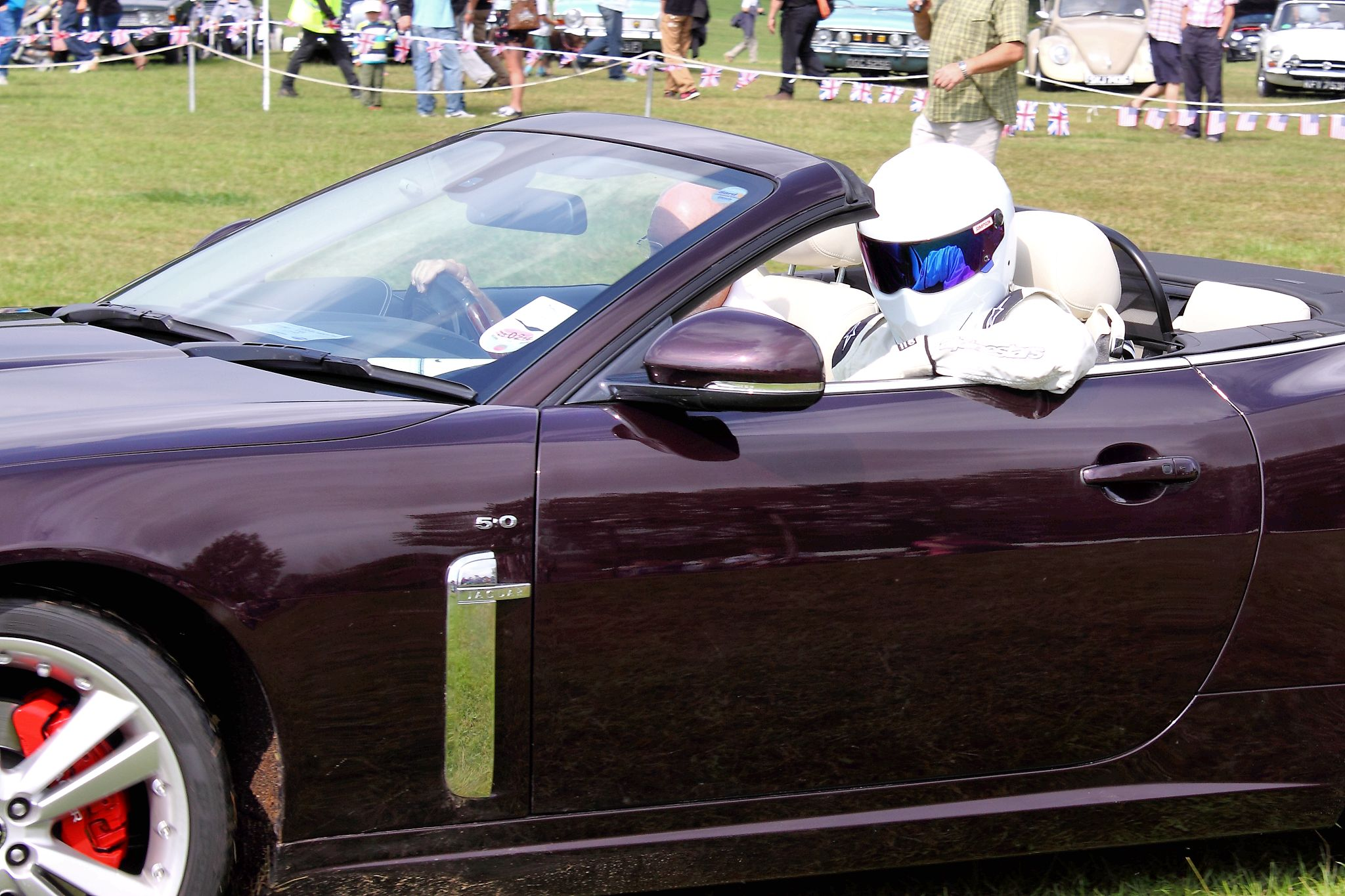
- The Second White Stig in 2013
- Portrayed by: Phil Keen
- Duration: 2010–2022 (after Top Gear hiatus)
- First appearance: 26 December 2010 (Series 16; Episode 1)
- Last appearance: 17 March 2019 (Series 26; Episode 5)

On 26 December 2010, five days after the "USA Road Trip" special, Top Gear aired a "Middle East Special" in which the presenters re-enacted the journey of the Three Wise Men to Bethlehem. At the episode's conclusion, they discovered a manger cradling not Jesus, but a baby Stig.

In the series 16 premiere a month later, the presenters made an in universe explanation 'that Stigs grow very quickly, and the new Stig was thus already fully grown. Aside from a slightly different helmet and overalls, this Stig closely resembles the previous Stig.'

In his first episode, he set a speed record around the track (1:15.1) in an Ariel Atom V8 – Clarkson commenting that this Stig posted times "broadly comparable to those of Sacked Stig". The same Stig was retained following the departures of Clarkson, Hammond and May in 2015 following Clarkson's suspension and dismissal from the BBC due to a fracas that occurred during filming of series 22.

His identity remained secret until 2024, when Clarkson revealed it was endurance racing driver Phil Keen. His identity was also confirmed by Andy Wilman in his book Mr. Wilman's Motoring Adventure.

=== Third White Stig / Paul Rees (2019-2022) ===
After the conclusion of Series 26 in 2019, Phil Keen left Top Gear for reasons unknown to the public. British racing driver Paul Rees took over the role of The Stig from 2019 for the remainder of the show's run, during the transition in which Paddy McGuinness and Freddie Flintoff became presenters.

Unlike previous mantel changes of The Stig, this change was never acknowledged or mentioned on-air. This change was only made public when Rees, in an interview with The Telegraph in July 2026, revealed that he played the role. Rees stated that he was a passenger when presenter Freddie Flintoff was involved in a serious car crash during filming in December 2022, with both suffering from serious injuries.

== Cousins and other family members ==
Various episodes have featured cousins and other relatives of the Stig, often when the show is filming outside the United Kingdom or require a specific driving skill, such as the lorry-driving "Rig Stig". These individuals dress in different attires, but always wear the Stig's helmet, and continue the tradition of remaining silent.

"Big Stig"
US Special (2007)
The US Special featured a portly American cousin nicknamed "Big Stig". He raced the presenters' cars around the Palm Beach International Raceway track. Clarkson stated he had a "relaxed driving style".
"African Cousin"
Botswana Special (2007)
The Botswana Special featured the Stig's African cousin, with dark skin, wearing just Puma shoes, a loincloth, white racing gloves and the iconic white helmet. He raced two of the presenters' chosen cars around an improvised rally track; Clarkson's Lancia Beta refused to start. According to the special's DVD commentary, this cousin was "...an incredibly well-respected driver".
"Rig Stig"
Series 12; Episode 1 (2008)
"Rig Stig" sports a suntanned right sleeve and glove in reference to his supposed job as a lorry driver. He appeared powersliding a Team Oliver racing truck to show to the presenters that a lorry could drift.
"Communist Cousin"
Vietnam Special (2008)
A version of the Stig that rode a motorbike and wore a red racing suit. Although featured in a montage compiled at the beginning of Series 12 showing a preview of the episodes to come, his feature did not air in the original broadcast of the special. The footage was however included in a later DVD release. Top Gear hired a local motorcycle stunt rider.
"Janet Stig-Porter/Eco Stig"
Series 14; Episode 2 (2009)
The Stig's vegetarian cousin, nicknamed "Janet Stig-Porter", appeared. He wore green overalls, Birkenstock sandals with socks, and a solar-powered helmet. He drove the presenters' "Hammerhead Eagle i-Thrust" hybrid around the MIRA test circuit to see how long it would last, but was incapacitated by the car's diesel fumes. Ben Collins later revealed that he played Eco Stig.
"Herr Stig/Stiggy Ray Cyrus"
Series 15; Episode 2 (2010)
The Stig's German cousin was also nicknamed "Herr Stig" and "Stiggy Ray Cyrus". He was almost identical to the main Stig, the main difference being a mullet haircut. He drove the presenters' cheap sports saloons around EuroSpeedway Lausitz. This Stig was also portrayed by Ben Collins.
"Bunga-Bunga Stig"
Series 18; Episode 1 (2012)
The Stig's Italian cousin, "Bunga-Bunga Stig", was introduced during the final leg of the Italian Road Trip at Imola Circuit. He came out of a motor-home dressed in a suit, followed by three glamorous women, to set a lap time in a Ferrari 458 Italia.
"Attack Stig"
Series 18; Episode 2 (2012)
The Stig's Chinese cousin, "Attack Stig", made his dramatic arrival by kung fu–kicking through a door at a local race track. While in appearance he looks the same as the normal Stig, this Stig indiscriminately used Bruce Lee–esque martial arts moves on anyone. His unruly behaviour caused problems not just for the presenters but also for the filming crew, flag-bearer and a nearby track marshal, who this Stig even interrupted his timed lap of the Roewe 350 to fight. After the timed laps, he walked on-screen and kicked James "in the plums". Clarkson's remark on Attack Stig was: "That's the worst Stig we've ever had."
First "Teenage Cousin"
Series 21; Episode 1 (2014)
The Stig's teenage cousin has headphones, a low waist line allowing his underwear to be seen and a phone he seldom stopped looking at. He drove a SEAT León hatchback to set a hill run time against the presenters's classic hot hatchbacks. He also appears in advertisements promoting the mobile game Top Gear: Race the Stig.
"Australian Cousin"
Series 22; Episode 2 (2015)
The Stig's Australian cousin was introduced during a hill-climb track in the Australian outback, placed in an open-cut iron ore mine and setting a benchmark time in an HSV Maloo Ute. He looks similar to the ordinary Stig, except for dusty, white overalls with flip-flops, a large "gentleman sausage" and muscular upper body.
"Leisure Stig"
Series 22; Episode 8 (2015)
The Stig's leisure activity cousin is also known as Top Gear's top-secret Leisure Stig. He is only used for testing caravans and is an otherwise useless driver. He appears identical to the ordinary Stig, but is notably slower.
"Teenaged Cousins"
Series 24; Episode 4 (2017); Series 25; Episode 4 (2018) Series 29; Episode 2 (2020)
The Stig's three Teenaged Cousins sported the same appearance as the previous Teenage Cousin, each sporting smartphones and headphones of different colours. They drove the Renault Twingo GT, the Smart Fortwo Brabus, and the Volkswagen Up on the Top Gear track, in a race against each other. Two Teenaged Stigs appear again in Series 25, this time racing the Hyundai i30 N against the Volkswagen Golf GTI Mk7 on a wet Top Gear track.
"Emirati Cousin"
Series 24; Episode 4 (2017)
The Stig's Emirati cousin drove host Matt LeBlanc through downtown Dubai in a Bentley Mulsanne. He looks similar to the ordinary Stig, except for wearing a ghutrah on top of his helmet, and a diamond watch on his wrist.
"StigFoot"
Series 25; Episode 2 (2018)
StigFoot appears briefly at the end of the episode having been pursued by LeBlanc and Harris as they search for Bigfoot.
"Ninja Stig"
Series 25; Episode 3 (2018)
The Stig's Japanese ninja cousin appears during Harris's visit to Japan, where he raced Harris in a drifting duel. He wore a black helmet, black ninja outfit and a katana strapped to his back.
"Business Stig"
Series 26; Episode 2 (2019)
The Stig's business cousin appears during Harris's review of the BMW M5 and Mercedes-AMG E63 S. He wears a red tie and a set of braces.
"Stig's dad"
Series 30; Episode 1 (2021)
The Stig's dad appears during a rally challenge in the episode's main feature which deals with the main presenters commemorating their dads' cars, setting the benchmark time the presenters then try to beat. He wears a tank top and flare trousers.

=== Other Stigs ===
The Australian, French, Finnish, Korean, Russian, Chinese and U.S. adaptions of Top Gear also feature their own versions of The Stig. The Top Gear Australia Stig was wheeled on screen, upside down in a delivery crate for the UK-Australian "Top Gear Ashes" episode. Additionally, when Top Gear Australia visited New Zealand (in series 3 episode 2), they introduced their Stig's Kiwi cousin, "The Stug" (referencing New Zealand English's centralised short-"i" sound). When Top Gear U.S. drove a modified off-road racer through Colorado against a kayak, they introduced "Backwoods Stig", who wears a white racing overall with torn off sleeves. The Stig was rarely used in the US version as presenter Tanner Foust is himself a professional racing driver, but was portrayed by Paul F. Gerrard. The Korean version of the Stig is reportedly portrayed by Bil Li-ship.

In the DVD Top Gear: The Worst Car in the History of the World, the Stig's Yorkshire cousin, nicknamed "T'Stig" (a reference to the Yorkshire accent), was featured. Alongside his trademark racing outfit, he had a flat cap on his helmet and two whippets by his feet. He was involved in driving a BMW around a Gymkhana course to show how it is done for when James and Jeremy attempt to do so with two of the worst American cars. He was also prompted to drive a Peugeot 308 – one of the cars that was the candidate for the title, but he fled.

== Temporary Stigs ==
For Jimmy Carr's first appearance on the show, Ben Collins was unavailable so former Formula 1 driver Julian Bailey stepped in to coach him.

The Renault R24 set a lap time of 59.0 seconds, the fastest ever at the time. Later, it was revealed that Heikki Kovalainen, drove the car as The Stig. The record stood for 21 years.

In the Winter Olympics special Top Gear used Dan Lang, a Swedish snowmobile champion, to jump a snowmobile.

In the "USA Road Trip" (aired 21 December 2010), Tiff Needell was brought in as an "Emergency Stig" to train Danny Boyle on the track, filling the void between the sacking of the original White Stig and the arrival of his replacement.

== Other appearances ==
In June 2008, the Stig drove a passenger in a two-seat Formula One car at speeds up to 178 mph (286 km/h) for three laps around the Silverstone Circuit in wet conditions, hours before the start of the 2008 British Grand Prix. The drive was the prize in a charity auction held in aid of Great Ormond Street Children's Hospital where the winning bidder paid £35,000 for the privilege. The Stig appeared at the 2008 October National Television Awards to accept Top Gear's third award for best factual programme, as the other presenters were ostensibly busy filming the new series. The Stig also appears at Top Gear Live events, such as the August 2010 Stunt Show at the Nürburgring in Germany, in which he is billed as the star of the show alongside the other stunt drivers and cars, with the other Top Gear presenters not playing a part. The Stig has appeared outside Top Gear in Clarkson's motoring DVDs since 2005. He also appeared before the BBC's 2011 British Grand Prix coverage when Clarkson and Hammond gave the camera crew a tour of the Top Gear studio.

In February 2009, a YouTube video emerged which suggested the Black Stig had survived his accident. Still wearing his iconic black overalls, helmet and only one glove, he is witnessed to emerge from the waves by a group of men playing frisbee on the beach at Walton-on-the-Naze in Essex, where he initially mistook their frisbee for a steering wheel, before running away.

In the 2011 X Games 17, the Stig can be seen walking in the background during one of Brian Deegan's interviews during Rallycross. Tanner Foust, one of the presenters of Top Gear U.S., was competing in the event.

Google Street view of the Dunsfold track shows the Google Camera car being paced by The Stig driving a Mercedes SLS coupe.

In 2016, he was a part of The Getaway Car presented by Dermot O'Leary along with his two "nephews" simply called "Red Stig" and "Blue Stig".

On 8 December 2016, the Stig appears for a short moment in a segment from series 23, where he is seen reading a paper while Ken Block zooms past in his Hoonicorn Mustang along with Matt LeBlanc.

On 30 March 2017, the Stig appeared on Colin Furze's World's Fastest Bumper Car YouTube video, which featured a modified 1960s bumper car and a 600cc 100bhp engine.

For a period, the Stig, along with the Top Gear presenters, appeared in miniature at Legoland Windsor, arranged around a model of a Caterham sports car.

== Cultural impact and merchandising ==
The Scotsman described the Stig in 2008 as a "real-life James Bond able to tame the most powerful cars, while possessing all the mystique of Zorro". The Sunday Times in 2009 described the Stig as "not a man but an idea, possibly an extraterrestrial", speculating that, along the lines of the Spartacus mythology, the more people that were linked with the character, the stronger the mystery would become. It paid tribute to how long the show had actually kept the secret.

The question of "Who is the Stig?" has been described as one of the most-asked queries on the Internet. The Sunday Times reported that online and text-answering services rated it as one of the most popular questions of all time, along with the meaning of life.

The Stig has been notionally "spotted" in the wild in images collected for Google Street View. He was photographed by a Street View car standing on the side of the A82 road in Loch Ness, Scotland. He was also captured by a Street View tricycle in three locations within Legoland Windsor in Berkshire, including riding a go-kart and sitting on a camel. A Street View image taken from the A40 Westway of the Stig apparently standing in a window of the Top Gear office was reportedly just a cardboard cut-out.

The BBC has capitalised on the mystery behind the Stig by marketing "I AM THE STIG" T-shirts and variants through the Top Gear shop. Other Stig merchandise has included bubble wash, pens, keyrings, soap on a rope, lunchbags and a "sonic toothbrush".

Through a partnership with Polyphony Digital, the Stig's helmet and overalls are available for virtual purchase in the videogames Gran Turismo 5 and Gran Turismo 6. The Stig has also appeared several times in the Forza Motorsport series, including as avatar items in Forza Motorsport 4, one-on-one racing challenges against "The Stig's Digital Cousin" in Forza Motorsport 5 and Forza Motorsport 6, and as a driver outfit in an add-on for Forza Motorsport 7 and as a reward in Forza Horizon 4.

In 2018, Piccadilly Press (under licence from BBC Worldwide) published The Stig Plays a Dangerous Game, the first in a series of children's books featuring The Stig as the silent 'secret weapon' of a group of friends who become 'the Top Gear Gang'. The Stig Drives Again was published later the same year and the third in the trilogy, The Stig and the Silver Ghost, came out in October 2019. The books feature in a joint venture with the School Libraries Association to promote school literacy whereby initial copies of each book, plus support materials, are provided free of charge to requesting schools.
