= Rory Reid =

Rory Reid may refer to:

- Rory Reid (politician) (born 1963), American attorney and politician
- Rory Reid (journalist) (born 1979), English television presenter

== See also ==
- Rory Read, American businessman
