= Avtoros Shaman =

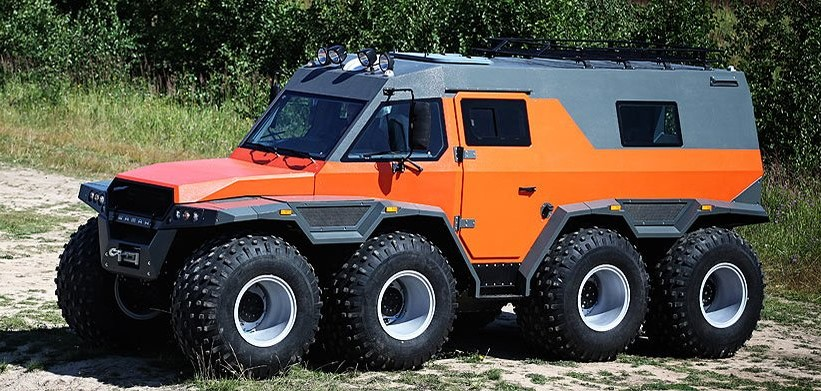

Overview
- Manufacturer: Avtoros
- Production: 2014-present (2926)
- Assembly: Russia

Powertrain
- Engine: Iveco F1C 3.0TD, 176 CV
- Transmission: ZF 400 6-speed manual

Dimensions
- Length: 6.3 m (20 ft 8 in)
- Width: 2.64 m (8 ft 8 in)
- Height: 2.95 m (9 ft 8 in)
- Curb weight: 4.8 tonnes (11,000 lb; 4,800 kg)

The Avtoros Shaman is a four cylinder diesel engine 8x8 all-terrain vehicle, built by Russian company Avtoros. The vehicle can seat eight passengers. It features low pressure tyres, an optional extra that allows it to navigate on water, a "captain's chair" driving position, and three drive modes. It has both on and off-road capabilities, and a "crab" mode that allows the car to move sideways. Its design was intended to allow it to navigate all forms of terrain and be an ideal choice for outdoor driving, with each vehicle costing over €250,000. The vehicle takes several months to be manufactured.

== Specifications ==
| Top Speed | 70 km/h (43 mph) |
| Transmission | ZF 6 S 400 |
| Engine | Iveco F1C 3.0TD, 176 CV |
| Horsepower | 176 hp (131 kW) |

== Operators ==
- Haiti: 4 Shamans were delivered to the Defence Force of Haiti in March 2018.

== See also ==
- TREKOL, another Russian manufacture of large ATVs

== Links ==
- Official website
