= Matt LeBlanc =

American actor (born 1967)

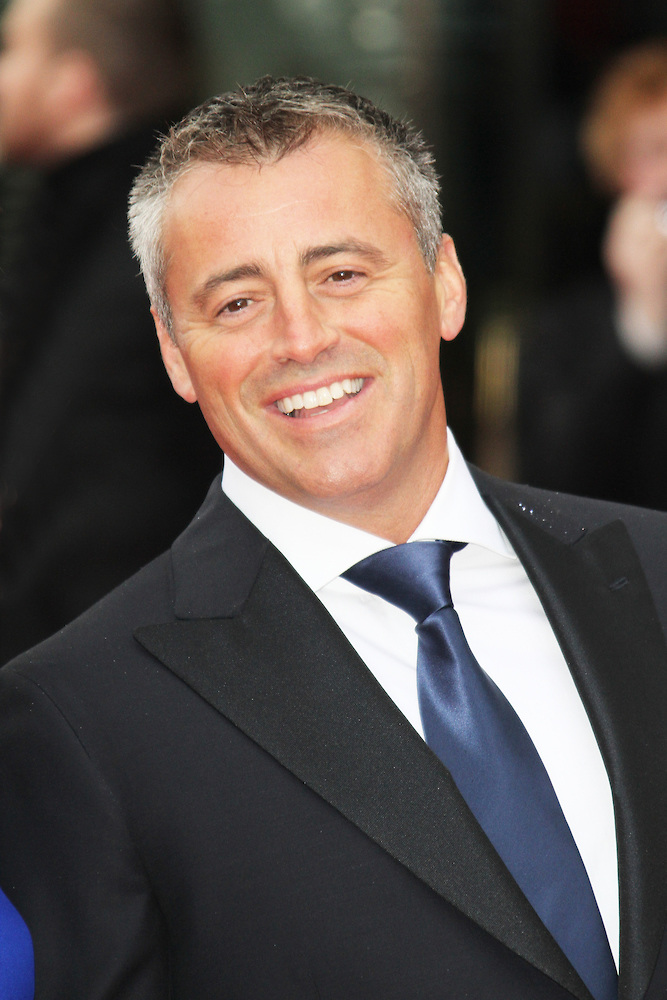
- LeBlanc in 2013
- Born: Matthew Steven LeBlanc; July 25, 1967 (age 59); Newton, Massachusetts, U.S.
- Education: Wentworth Institute of Technology (dropped out)
- Occupation: Actor
- Years active: 1987–present
- Known for: Friends (1994–2004); Joey (2004–2006); Episodes (2011–2017); Man with a Plan (2016–2020); Top Gear (2016–2019)
- Spouse: Melissa McKnight (m. 2003; div. 2006)
- Partner: Andrea Anders (2006–2014)
- Children: 1

Matthew Steven LeBlanc (/ləˈblɑːŋk/ lə-BLAHNK; born July 25, 1967) is an American actor. He gained global recognition with his portrayal of Joey Tribbiani in the NBC sitcom Friends (1994–2004), and in its spin-off series Joey (2004–2006). For his work on Friends, LeBlanc received three nominations at the Primetime Emmy Awards. He has also starred as a fictionalized version of himself in Episodes (2011–2017), for which he won a Golden Globe Award and received four additional Emmy Award nominations. He co-hosted Top Gear from 2016 to 2019. From 2016 to 2020, he played patriarch Adam Burns in the CBS sitcom Man with a Plan.

== Early life ==
Matthew Steven LeBlanc was born at Newton-Wellesley Hospital in Newton, Massachusetts. His mother, Patricia (née Di Cillo), was an office manager; his father, Paul LeBlanc, was a mechanic and a veteran of the Vietnam War. He has a brother named Justin LeBlanc. His father is of French-Canadian descent and his mother is of Italian ancestry, the daughter of immigrants from Arce, Lazio. He attended Newton North High School, where he graduated in the same year as future comedian Louis C.K. After high school he attended college at Wentworth Institute of Technology in Boston. He dropped out shortly after starting his second semester.

LeBlanc moved to New York at the age of 17 to pursue a career in modeling, but he was told he was too short to be in the industry. His acting career began after a woman invited him to accompany her to an audition, where he ended up getting signed by her manager. Although he had booked commercials and television and film roles before Friends, he was reportedly down to his last eleven dollars before landing the role of Joey Tribbiani.

== Career ==
=== 1987–1994: Early career ===
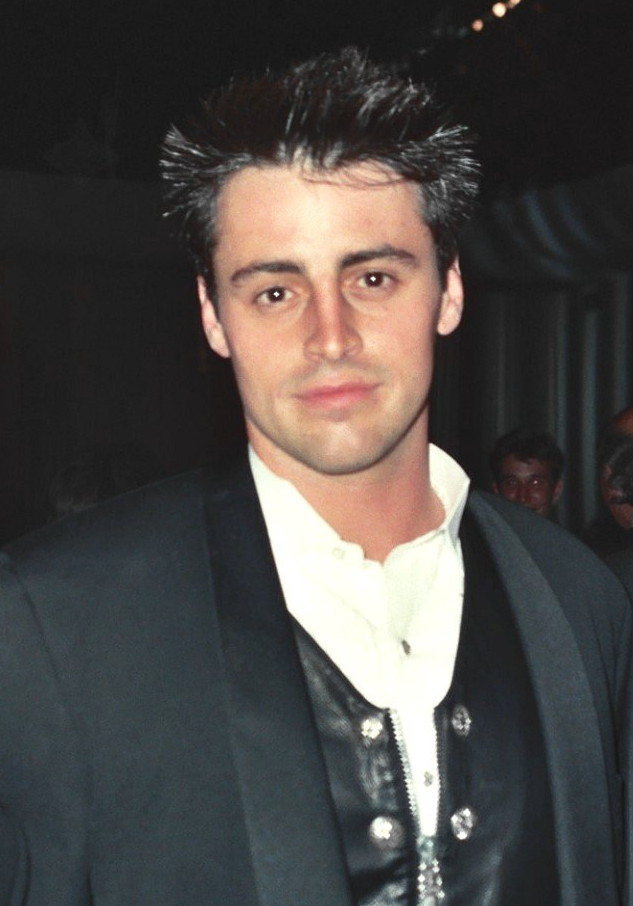
LeBlanc at the 47th Primetime Emmy Awards, 1995

LeBlanc first appeared in a 1987 Heinz Tomato Ketchup commercial. In 1988, he starred in the television drama TV 101 for one season. In 1991, he had a recurring role on the hit Fox sitcom Married... with Children. He played Vinnie Verducci, a family friend of protagonist Al Bundy (Ed O'Neill) who briefly dates his daughter, Kelly (Christina Applegate). He also guest-starred in the first season of Red Shoe Diaries. LeBlanc starred in two short-lived Married... with Children spin-offs: Top of the Heap (1991) and Vinnie & Bobby (1992).

He appeared in two Bon Jovi music videos: "Miracle", from the Young Guns II soundtrack in 1990, and "Say It Isn't So" in 2000. He also appeared in videos for Alanis Morissette's single "Walk Away", Tom Petty and the Heartbreakers's "Into the Great Wide Open" and Bob Seger's "Night Moves".

=== 1994–2006: Friends, Joey and film roles ===
LeBlanc found success as Joey Tribbiani on Friends; he played this character for 12 years—10 seasons of Friends and two seasons of Joey. Friends was wildly successful, and LeBlanc (along with co-stars Jennifer Aniston, Courteney Cox, Lisa Kudrow, Matthew Perry, and David Schwimmer) gained wide recognition among viewers. This ensemble situation comedy became a major hit for NBC, airing on Thursday nights for ten years.

For his performance, LeBlanc received three Primetime Emmy Award nominations, three Golden Globe award nominations, and one Screen Actors Guild Award nomination. During this time he also appeared in the films Lookin' Italian (1994), Ed (1996), Lost in Space (1998), Charlie's Angels (2000), and its sequel, Charlie's Angels: Full Throttle (2003).

Following the cancellation of Joey, LeBlanc announced that he would be taking a one-year hiatus from acting on television, which eventually turned into five years.

=== 2011–present: Career revival ===
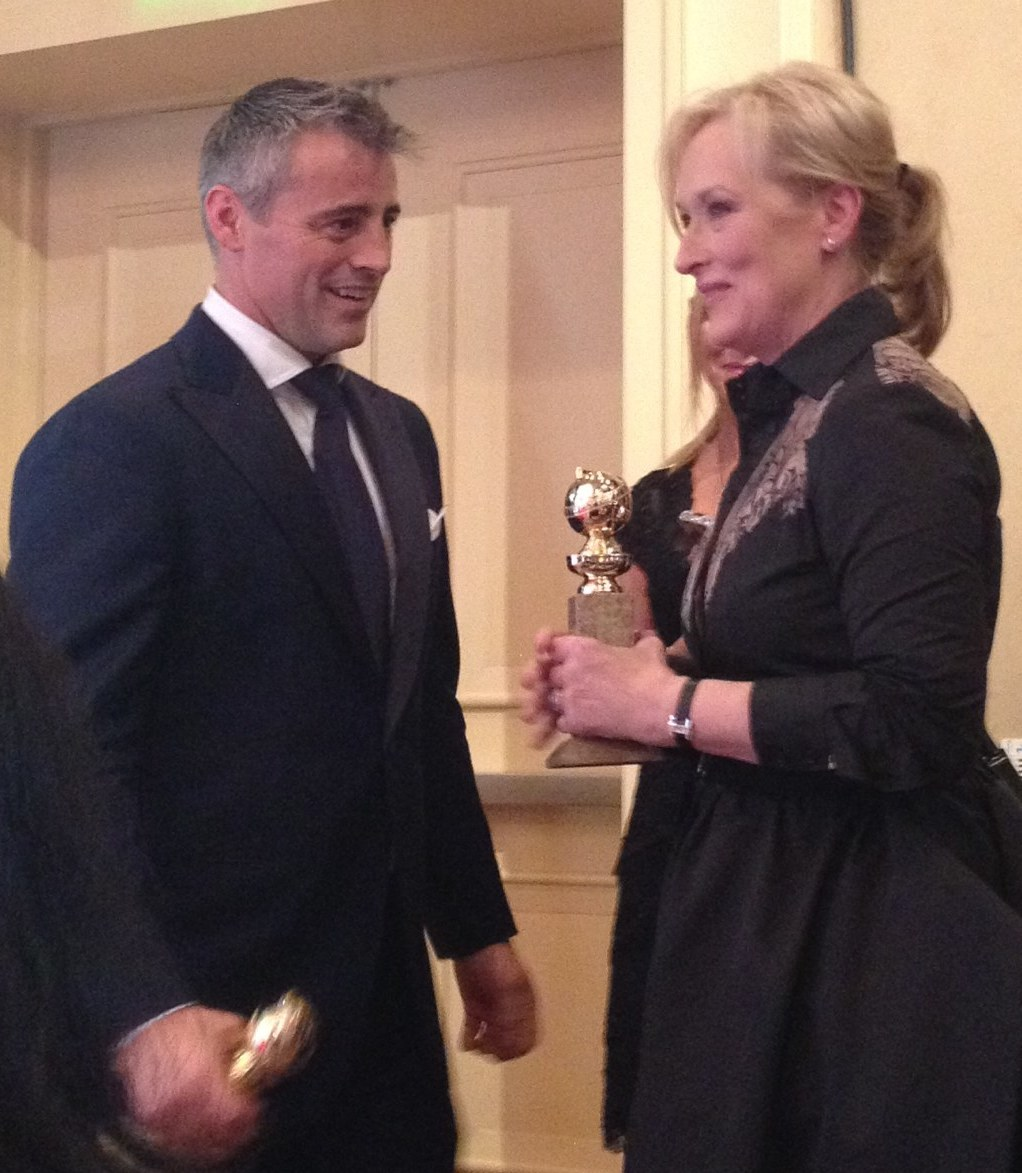
LeBlanc at the Golden Globes with Meryl Streep, 2012

From 2011, LeBlanc appeared as a fictionalized version of himself in Episodes, a television series about an American remake of a fictional British television series. The series is written by Friends co-creator David Crane and his partner Jeffrey Klarik. The role was nominated for a Primetime Emmy Award four times and, at the 69th Golden Globe Awards in 2012, LeBlanc was awarded Best Actor – Television Series Musical or Comedy of 2011.

In February 2012, LeBlanc appeared in the second episode of the eighteenth series of Top Gear, where he set the fastest lap time in the "Star in a Reasonably Priced Car" segment in a Kia Cee'd. Lapping at 1:42.1, he beat the show's previous record-holder, Rowan Atkinson, by 0.1 seconds. He later appeared in the fourth episode of the nineteenth series to race the new Kia Cee'd, with which he beat his previous time.

In February 2016, the BBC announced LeBlanc had signed on to become one of the new Top Gear hosts, signing a two-year deal later that year. In May 2018, he announced that he was leaving the series in order to spend more time with his family and friends in the US. He and Rory Reid were replaced by new co-hosts Paddy McGuinness and Andrew Flintoff for the twenty-seventh series in June 2019.

LeBlanc played the lead role in the CBS sitcom Man with a Plan, which began airing in 2016 until it was cancelled in 2020.

LeBlanc will star in and serve as executive producer for a police drama titled Flint that is planned for the 2027-2028 season on CBS.

== Personal life ==
LeBlanc has an extensive interest in cars, and worked as a carpenter before acting. In the mid-1990s, he dated actress Kate Hudson. He married Melissa McKnight, a British-born American model and a divorced single mother of two children, in May 2003. They had been introduced to each other in 1997 by McKnight's friend, Kelly Phillips (wife of actor Lou Diamond Phillips). LeBlanc proposed to her a year later. Their daughter, born in 2004, began suffering seizures at eight months old. By the time she was two years old, the condition, thought to be due to cortical dysplasia, had mostly subsided. LeBlanc and McKnight divorced in October 2006, citing irreconcilable differences.

LeBlanc met actress Andrea Anders in 2004, while she was co-starring as his friend and eventual love interest on Joey. The pair eventually embarked on a relationship, which was confirmed in 2006 following LeBlanc's divorce from his wife Melissa McKnight. After over eight years as a couple, LeBlanc announced at the start of 2015 that he and Anders had separated several months earlier. LeBlanc was in a six-year-long relationship with Aurora Mulligan until 2022.

LeBlanc started getting gray hair around the second season of Friends and dyed his hair throughout the course of the series. Once the spin-off series Joey ended, he stopped dyeing his hair.

LeBlanc primarily resides in Pacific Palisades, Los Angeles.

== Filmography ==
=== Film ===
Year	Title	Role	Notes
1987	Doll Day Afternoon	G.I. Joe	Film debut, short film
1988	Tequila Sunrise	Chuck Bender	Uncredited
1993	Grey Knight	Terhue	
1994	Lookin' Italian	Anthony Manetti	
1996	Ed	Jack "Deuce" Cooper	
1998	Lost in Space	Major Don West	
2000	Charlie's Angels	Jason Gibbs	
2001	All the Queen's Men	O'Rourke	
2003	Charlie's Angels: Full Throttle	Jason Gibbs	
2010	Jonah Hex	—N/a	Executive producer
2014	Lovesick	Charlie Darby	

=== Television ===
Year	Title	Role	Notes
1988–1989	TV 101	Chuck Bender	Series regular (13 episodes)
1989	Just the Ten of Us	Todd Murphy	2 episodes
1990	Anything to Survive	Billy Burton	Television film
1990	Monsters	Tommy	Episode: "Shave and a Haircut, Two Bites"
1991	Married... with Children	Vinnie Verducci	4 episodes
1991	Top of the Heap	Vinnie Verducci	Main cast (7 episodes)
1992	Vinnie & Bobby	Vinnie Verducci	Main cast (7 episodes)
1992	Red Shoe Diaries	Kyle	Episode: "Just Like That"
1993	Red Shoe Diaries	Jed Cody	Episode: "Kidnap"
1993	Class of '96	Frank Goodman	Episode: "Bright Smoke, Cold Fire"
1994	Reform School Girl	Vince	Television film
1994–2004	Friends	Joey Tribbiani	Main cast (236 episodes)
2004–2006	Joey	Joey Tribbiani	Lead role (46 episodes)
2011–2017	Episodes	Fictionalized version of himself	Main cast (41 episodes)
2011–2012	Top Gear	Himself (guest)	2 episodes
2013	Web Therapy	Nick Jericho	Web series; 3 episodes
2013	Web Therapy	Nick Jericho	Television series; 2 episodes
2015	The Prince	—N/a	Television film; producer
2016–2019	Top Gear	Himself (presenter)	24 episodes (series 23, 24, 25, 26)
2016–2020	Man with a Plan	Adam Burns	Main cast (69 episodes); also executive producer
2021	Friends: The Reunion	Himself	Television special; also executive producer
2021	Top Gear: A Tribute to Sabine Schmitz	Himself	1 episode

=== Music videos ===
Year	Title	Artist	Role	Notes
1990	"Miracle"	Jon Bon Jovi	Friend	
1991	"Into the Great Wide Open"	Tom Petty and the Heartbreakers	Young man	
1991	"Walk Away"	Alanis Morissette	Boyfriend	
1994	"Night Moves"	Bob Seger	Young man	
2000	"Say It Isn't So"	Bon Jovi	Unknown	
