= Eddie Jordan =

Irish motorsport executive and broadcaster (1948–2025)

Eddie Jordan OBE
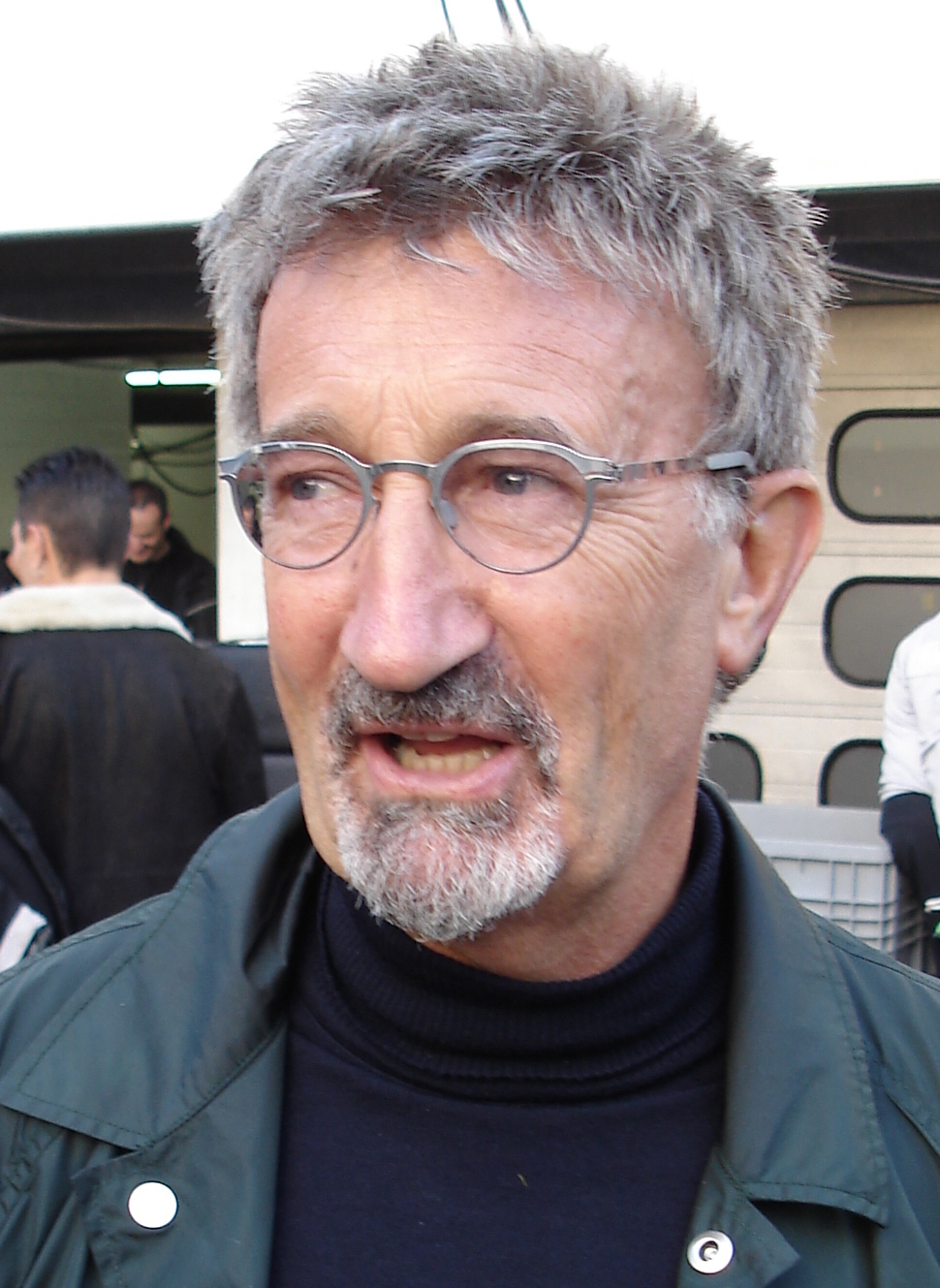
- Jordan in 2009
- Born: Edmund Patrick Jordan; 30 March 1948; Dublin, Ireland
- Died: 20 March 2025 (aged 76); Cape Town, South Africa
- Education: Synge Street CBS
- Occupations: Motorsport executive; broadcaster; racing driver; businessman
- Employers: International F3000; Eddie Jordan Racing (1985–1991); Formula One; Jordan (1991–2005)
- Title: Founder; Team Principal
- Spouse: Marie McCarthy (m. 1979)
- Children: 4

24 Hours of Le Mans career
- Years: 1981
- Teams: EMKA
- Best finish: DNF (1981)
- Class wins: 0

Edmund Patrick Jordan (30 March 1948 – 20 March 2025) was an Irish motorsport executive, broadcaster, racing driver and businessman. From 1991 to 2005, Jordan served as founder and team principal of Jordan in Formula One.

Born in Dublin, Jordan initially worked at the Bank of Ireland before he began kart racing aged 22, winning the Irish championship the following year and progressing to lower formulae. Between 1974 and 1979, he competed in Irish Formula Ford, Formula Three, Formula Atlantic and Formula Two. In 1979, he founded the eponymous Eddie Jordan Racing, who competed in International Formula 3000 from 1985 to 1991.

Jordan then founded Jordan Grand Prix as a Formula One constructor in 1991, winning four Grands Prix across 15 seasons and finishing third in the 1999 World Constructors' Championship. He sold the team to Midland at the end of 2005. He worked as an analyst for the BBC from 2009 to 2015, before joining Channel 4 in 2016. Jordan was also a co-owner of rugby club London Irish and association football club Celtic.

== Early life ==
Jordan was born at the Wentworth Nursing Home in Dublin on 30 March 1948, the son of Eileen and Danny Jordan. He had one older sibling, Helen. His father was the twin brother of a senior nun, the Mother Rectoress of the Irish Sisters of Charity, and worked as an accountant for the Electricity Supply Board (ESB) while playing for Shamrock Rovers where his nickname was "Snitchy Jordan". At ten months old, Jordan developed a form of pink disease and his family were advised by doctors to move from Dublin to nearby Bray in County Wicklow for "fresh air". His mother Eileen was advised to "take him out of woollens and into cotton during the month of May", advice she opposed, initially. Nevertheless, she conceded and Jordan's condition did gradually improve. During his childhood, Jordan grew up in Dartry, south Dublin, and in Bray. He spent most of his time in Bray, where he became close with his Aunt Lilian, having regularly travelled to visit her at the end of the school week. In his childhood, Jordan was known by the nickname "Flash" as his surname rhymed with the name Gordon.

Jordan began his education at Saint Anne's Pre-School in Milltown, later spending eleven years at the Synge Street Christian Brothers School, where he and his fellow students would be regularly beaten if they did not study hard. Despite this experience, Jordan found the level of education to be high. While at Synge Street, aged 15, Jordan briefly considered becoming a priest. Having dismissed the priesthood and family pressures to enter dentistry, he ended up taking a six-week accountancy course at the College of Commerce, Dublin, and then began working for the Bank of Ireland as a clerk at their branch in Mullingar. After four years, Jordan moved to the branch in Camden Street, Dublin. During a banking strike in Dublin in 1970, he spent the summer on the island of Jersey, working as an accountant for an electricity company by day and doing bar work in the evenings. During this period, he encountered kart racing for the first time and had his first (unofficial) races there at St Brelade's Bay.

== Career ==
=== Motor racing ===
Upon his return to Dublin, Jordan bought a kart and began racing. In 1971, he entered, and won the Irish Kart Championship.

In 1974, Jordan moved up to Formula Ford, the Irish Formula Ford Championship and, in 1975, to Formula Three, but was forced to sit out the 1976 season after shattering his left leg in a crash at Mallory Park. His hair fell out in hospital and his forceful mother then made him wear a wig. He continued to wear a wig for the rest of his life and this was the subject of practical jokes by Gerhard Berger.

After his injuries had healed, he switched to Formula Atlantic and won the Irish Formula Atlantic Championship in 1978. Jordan and Stefan Johansson raced in British Formula Three in 1979, under the name "Team Ireland" and, in the same year, Jordan drove in one Formula Two race and did a small amount of testing for McLaren. He raced in the 1981 24 Hours of Le Mans in a BMW M1 with Steve O'Rourke and David Hobbs.

In 1991, Jordan made a guest appearance at Silverstone in the Dunlop Rover GTI Championship that was a support event for the British Grand Prix. He finished tenth on the road after spinning out when running fourth but was promoted to ninth when fifth placed finisher Peter Baldwin was penalised for driving carelessly.

=== Team management ===
At the end of 1979 and short of money, Jordan founded his first team, Eddie Jordan Racing. The team ran drivers David Leslie and David Sears in 1981 and James Weaver in 1982. In 1983, Jordan signed Martin Brundle, who finished second to Ayrton Senna in British F3. A few years later, the team won the British Formula 3 championship in 1987 with Johnny Herbert.

With the establishment of Formula 3000 in 1985, Jordan expanded his team to F3000. The team's first wins in the series came with drivers Herbert and Martin Donnelly in 1988. Jean Alesi won the championship for the Jordan during the 1989 season, winning three races. In 1990, Eddie Irvine secured a win and four podiums for the team, finishing third overall.

=== Formula One ===
Jordan founded Jordan Grand Prix in 1991, with 7 Up serving as the team's title sponsor. The team employed Gary Anderson as its car designer, with engines supplied by Cosworth (with the partnership of Ford). During the season, Jordan gave Michael Schumacher his Formula 1 debut when the team's main driver, Bertrand Gachot, was sent to prison.

In 1998, the team achieved its best ever result when drivers Damon Hill and Ralf Schumacher finished first and second at the Belgian Grand Prix. In 1999, Heinz-Harald Frentzen secured two wins for the team throughout the season, eventually finishing third overall in the drivers' championship.

==== Decline and sale ====
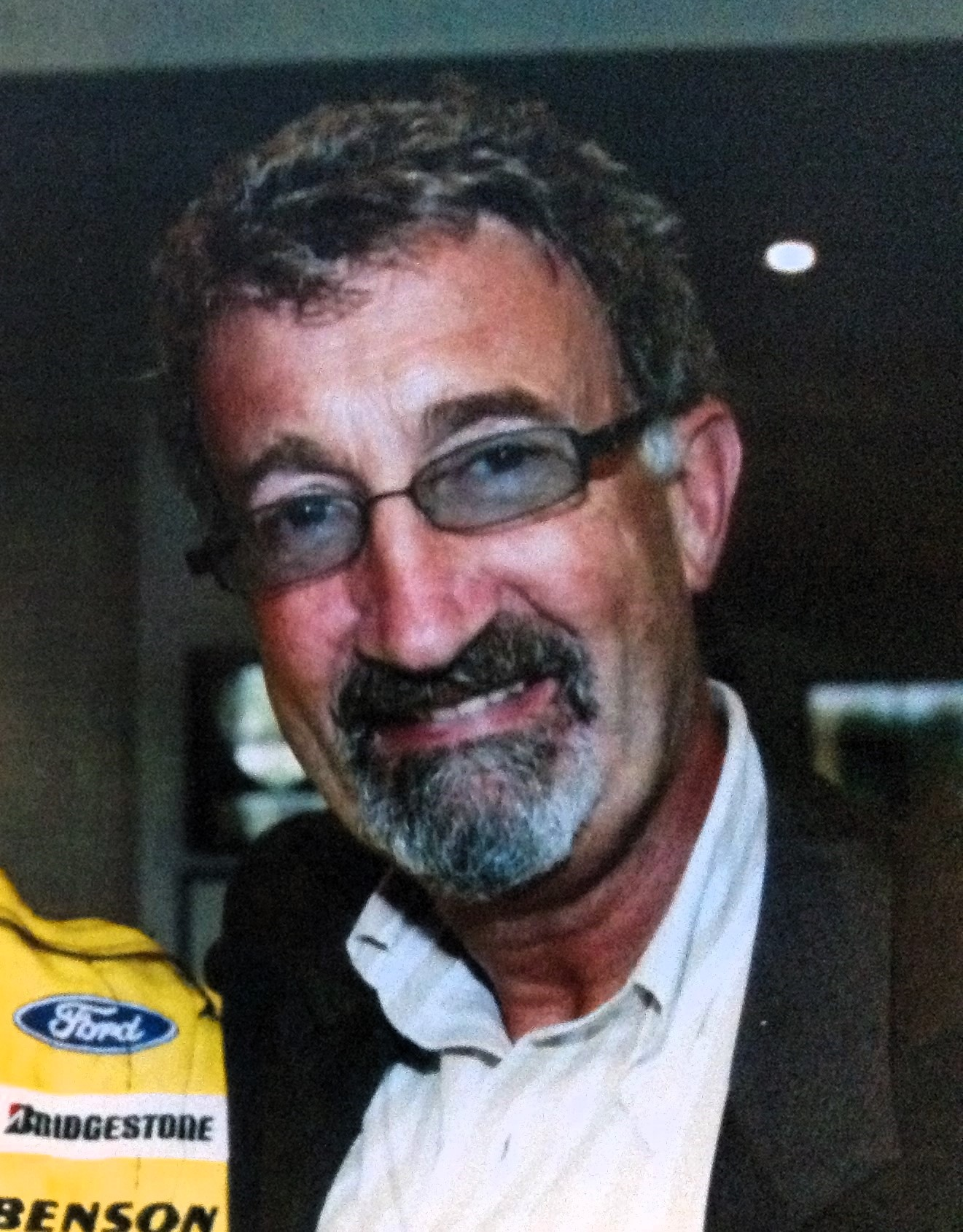
Jordan in 2004

In 2001, Jordan sued Vodafone for allegedly breaking a three-year multi-million dollar sponsorship agreement, although the case was later withdrawn. After losing a Honda engine partnership deal following the 2002 season, in addition to numerous difficulties within the team (including a very public row and the sacking of Frentzen before his home GP in 2001), Jordan was forced to switch to Cosworth engines. Furthermore, in 2003, the major sponsors DHL and Benson & Hedges both withdrew from the team. 2003 also marked the fourth & last victory for the team, following Giancarlo Fisichella's win at the Brazilian Grand Prix.

The team was switched to affordable Toyota engines for the 2005 season, following Ford's withdrawal from the sport. In early 2005, Jordan Grand Prix was bought by the Midland Group, financed by Canadian businessman Alex Shnaider.

==== Legacy of Jordan Grand Prix ====
Following the Midland Group's purchase of the team, it was subsequently renamed MF1 Racing for 2006. The team was sold again in 2006 to Dutch car manufacturer Spyker Cars to become Spyker F1 for 2007, and then sold once more to become Force India in 2008. After bankruptcy proceedings in 2018, Force India was liquidated and its former assets sold to the new Racing Point F1 Team, which became Aston Martin for the 2021 F1 season. Aston Martin competes in Formula One and operates out of Jordan's old premises at Silverstone.

==== Manager of Adrian Newey ====
Jordan served as the manager for British aerodynamicist and car designer Adrian Newey. Jordan helped negotiate Newey's move from Red Bull Racing to Aston Martin in 2024.

=== Media career ===
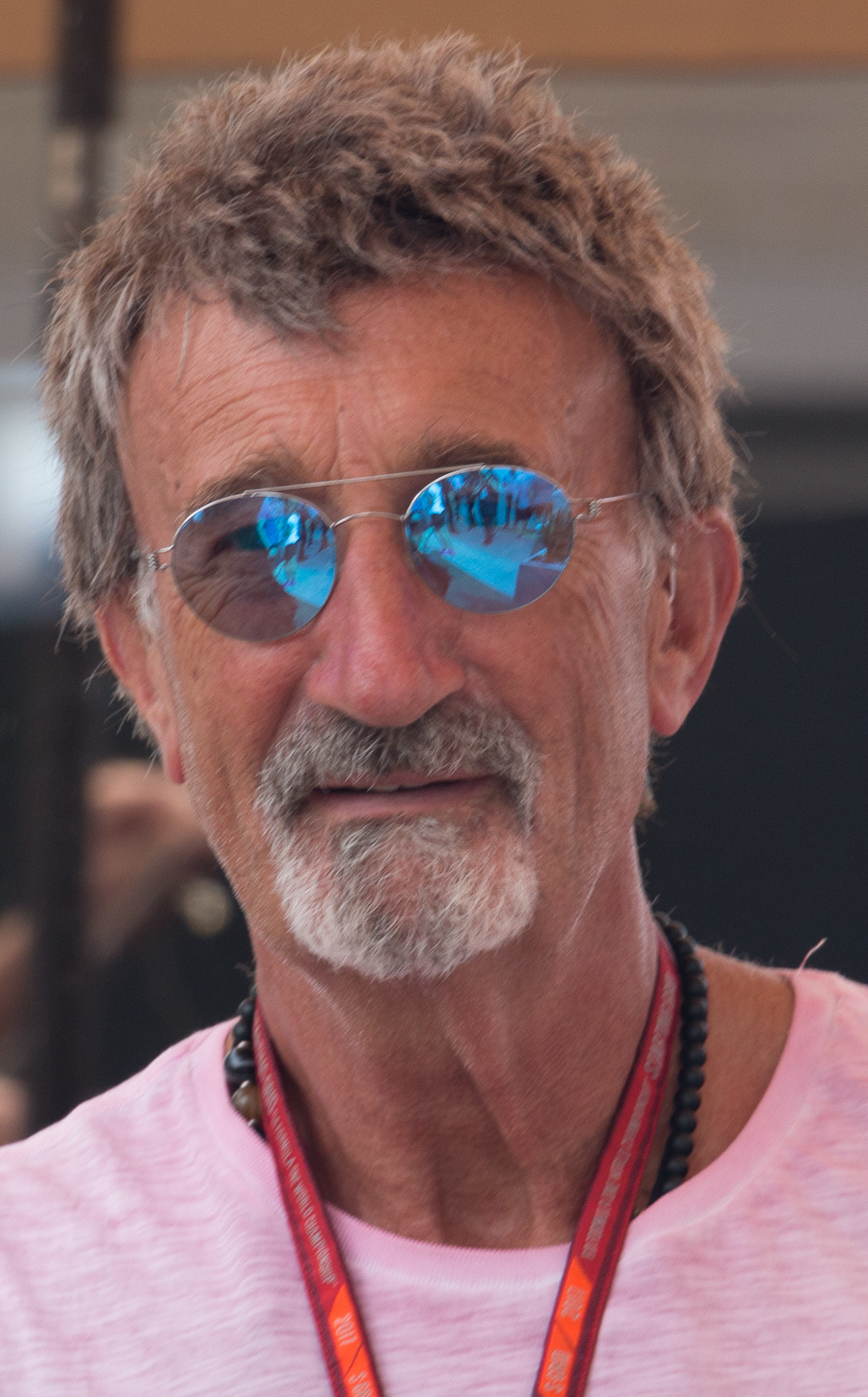
Jordan at the 2017 United States Grand Prix.

In 2009, Jordan returned to the F1 scene as a pundit for BBC Sport's Grand Prix programme alongside Jake Humphrey (who was later replaced by Suzi Perry) and David Coulthard. Following the end of BBC's F1 coverage at the end of 2015, Jordan moved to Channel 4 F1 for 2016 onwards. He remained with Channel 4 until his death in 2025.

Jordan wrote a monthly column called "This Much I Know" for F1 Racing magazine, until they relaunched with Murray Walker writing instead. Jordan also worked on a TV series called Eddie Jordan's Bad Boy Racers.

Jordan served as a presenter for Top Gear, co-presenting the 23rd series, before guest presenting until 2018.

In 2023, Jordan launched his own podcast called Formula For Success, alongside his BBC and Channel 4 co-presenter David Coulthard. The format for the show typically saw Coulthard and Jordan react to current affairs in Formula 1 or reminisce on the sport's history, typically with a special guest. Jordan's final appearance on the podcast released on the day of his passing, with the current future of the podcast unclear.

Jordan had a long time friendship with Bernie Ecclestone and interviewed him several times. Jordan had spoken many times about how Ecclestone influenced his career.

== Other interests ==
Jordan had a love of rock and roll music, he also played the drums. Until 2007, his band's name was V10. A cut-down version of the band has performed around the world under the name of Eddie and the Robbers, a name Jordan came up with after a comment from Bernie Ecclestone. Jordan was a fan of Celtic, Coventry City and Chelsea and had been linked with takeover bids for Coventry. Jordan was also a Celtic shareholder. Jordan's other sporting interests included golf and horse racing; he had horses in training with Mouse Morris.

Jordan was a cyclist in Monaco and South Africa and cycled in the Cape Town Cycle Tour (formerly the Argus) annually in Cape Town.

Jordan was also a keen sailor and boating enthusiast for much of his life. He circumnavigated the world in 2015. In 2014, Jordan took delivery of the largest Sunseeker Yacht then ever built, for reportedly a price tag of £32 million. Jordan owned Blush, a 45.3-metre (149 ft) yacht.

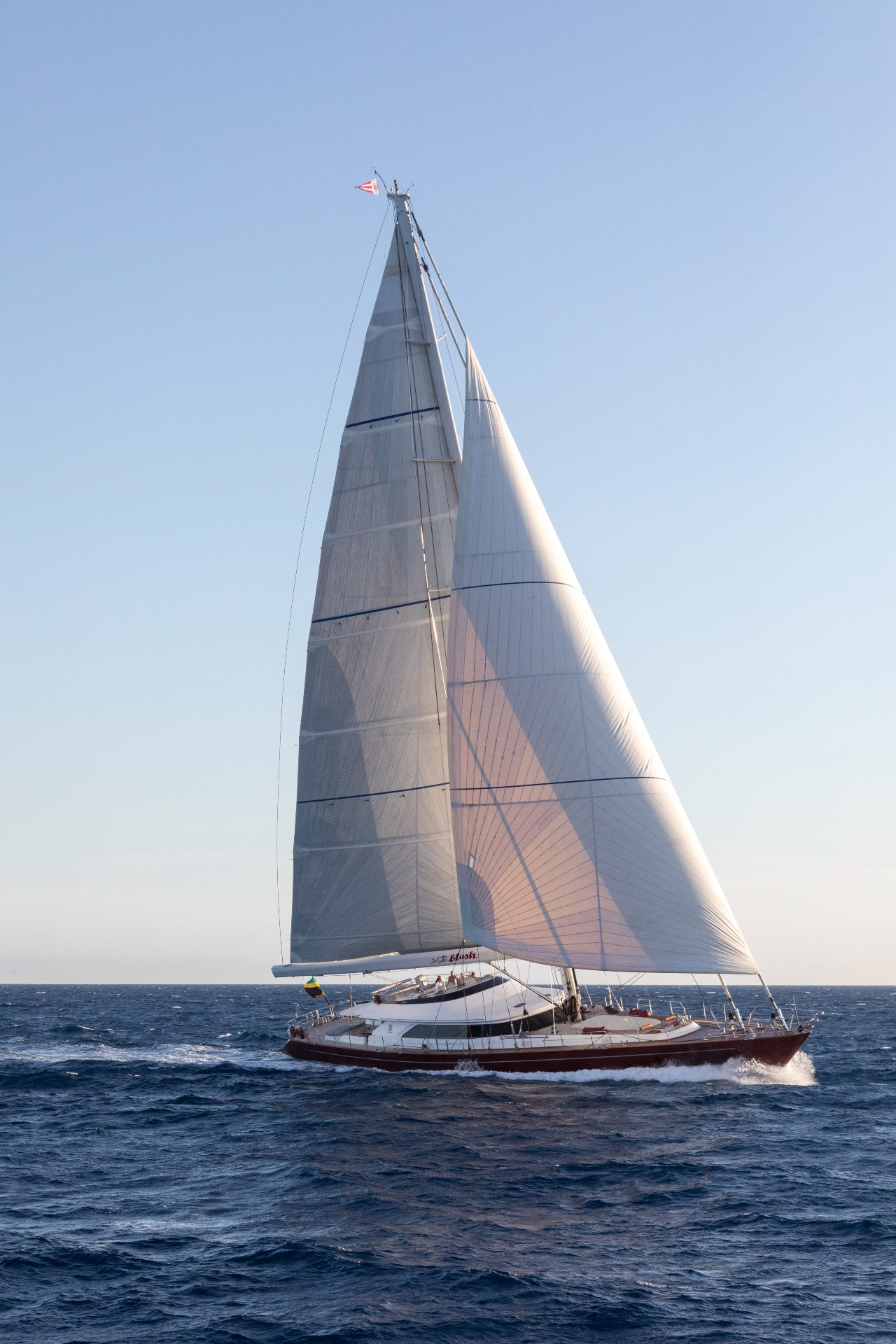
Perini Navi Yacht Blush

Jordan was a supporter of Irish art and had a wide collection that included Louis le Brocquy, Felim Egan and Markey Robinson among others.

== Business interests and entrepreneurship ==
Jordan had considerable business interests in oil, motor racing, sports, property, gaming, entertainment and the health and fitness industries.

Jordan was a shareholder in Celtic Football Club. He was an investor in Kinmont Advisory (a corporate advisory business) and a partner in hedge fund, Clareville Capital (founded by David Yarrow).

In 2018, Jordan assisted in the successful bid by his long time friend Richard Hadidas to acquire Oyster Yachts. Jordan served as a director on the board until 2021, when he then became the brand ambassador for the luxury yacht builder.

Jordan also invested in property, both commercial real estate (which included Bunbury Holdings), as well as residential developments and investments. He also owned land which houses a PGA golf course, and also invested in a land bank in Bulgaria, for which Norman Foster designed a resort.

Jordan was long-time friends with Dermot Desmond and Denis O'Brien, who were early supporters of Jordan F1. He had several investments alongside them since. In 2021, he founded JKO Capital to invest in gaming and entertainment businesses.

In July 2021, Jordan was linked with a $1 billion bid to buy the OpenBet business from Scientific Games. Jordan was a long time investor in the gaming space, with investments in Entain, Scientific Games and Evolution, among others.

In November 2021, it emerged that Jordan and Keith O'Loughlin were behind a bid by JKO to acquire Playtech for a rumoured £3 billion. In January 2022, JKO signalled they would not proceed with a formal offer for the company.

Jordan had also been on Citi Private Bank's advisory board.

Jordan had business interests that included Ready Room (South Africa), Tosca, Valeo Foods, Jarvis Hotels, Debrett's, Zwift, Apex, Coople (Recruitment) and Docplanner, Spring Studios, George & Dragon (a PR and Marketing agency) and Ceiba (a healthcare tech company). In the past, he also had his own vodka brand 'Vodka V10' and the energy drink brand 'EJ-10' and Bulgarian property company Madara Capital, that developed Karadere beach. He was an advisor to Aspinall Capital Partners.

As of 2024, Jordan was an advisor and investor in Northern Ireland-based private equity firm Strangford Capital.

Jordan published an autobiography, An Independent Man, in May 2007.

=== London Irish ===
In October 2024, Jordan was reported to be part of a consortium including ex-South Africa rugby player Bobby Skinstad and former New Zealand All Black Andrew Mehrtens looking to purchase former Premiership Rugby club London Irish. The consortium is backed by private equity group Strangford Capital. London Irish were looking for new ownership having been forced out of business as a result of an unpaid tax bill. The stated intention of the takeover was to emulate the success of the City Football Group for rugby with the consortium also in talks to purchase ProD2 club AS Béziers Hérault forming a network of interconnected clubs. In February 2025, the consortium completed the takeover of London Irish and stated their intention to return the club to either the Premiership or United Rugby Championship by 2026.

In October 2026, with Jordan having passed away the year before, his son sold the club to energy entrepreneur Steve Daniels.

== Personal life and death ==
Jordan married Marie McCarthy, an Irish former basketball player, in 1979 and had four children. They had homes in Cape Town, South Kensington, London and Monaco.

In December 2024, Jordan announced that he had been diagnosed with an aggressive form of prostate and bladder cancer earlier in the year. He died aged 76 at his home in Cape Town on 20 March 2025.

=== Charity work ===
Jordan was a patron of the child cancer charity CLIC Sargent, and of the Amber Foundation, a youth charity. The Eddie Jordan Foundation was established in his memory, providing funding and mentorship for people in sport, music, sailing, and business.

=== Honours ===
Jordan received honorary doctorates from the University of Ulster and Dublin Institute of Technology.

Jordan was awarded the James Joyce Award from the Literary and Historical Society of University College Dublin (UCD), one of the largest student societies in Ireland, to honour his contribution to motorsport in Ireland. He also received the Gold Medal of Honorary Patronage of the University Philosophical Society of Trinity College, Dublin, to honour his contribution to motor racing over the years. Despite being from Ireland, Jordan was also a member of the British Racing Drivers' Club due to a grandfather clause that allowed anyone born in Ireland before 1950 to still be eligible for membership.

In March 2012, Jordan was made an honorary OBE for services to charity and motor racing.

In September 2021, Jordan was bestowed the Freedom of the City of London.

=== Books ===
Jordan's autobiography, An Independent Man, was published in 2007. Eddie Jordan: Full Throttle by Keith O'Loughlin was released in 2025, including tributes from Denis O'Brien, Dermot Desmond, Richard Branson, and Roger Taylor, among others.
