= Factual television =

Genre of non-fiction television programming

Factual television is a genre of non-fiction television programming that documents actual events and people. These types of programs are also described as observational documentary, fly on the wall, docudrama, and reality television. The genre has existed in some form or another since the early years of television, although the term factual television has especially been used to describe programs produced since the 1990s. The term is especially used in the United Kingdom, Australia and New Zealand.

== Programmes ==
Television programmes in this genre include COPS and Rescue 911 from the United States, Airport and Jamie's School Dinners from Great Britain, and Border Security: Australia's Front Line and Bondi Rescue from Australia. These programmes tend to be more common in other countries than the United States due to differences in television scheduling patterns, as US networks schedule fewer hours on their own. Factual programmes tend to be cost-effective compared to other formats.

Prior to its launch, Variety referred to Discovery+ as a "factual streamer".

== Awards ==
"Best Factual Series" has been a category at the British Academy Television Awards since 1973. "Most Popular Factual Series" and "Most Outstanding Factual Series" were new categories introduced to the Australian Logie Awards in 2008 to cover this genre.

In September 2012 BBC Television's Top Gear series was officially named the Guinness World Records "Most Watched Factual TV Programme". As Jeremy Clarkson accepted the Guinness World Records 2013 book on behalf of the show he stated: "I am very proud to be involved in such a factual programme."

== See also ==
- Public broadcasting
