= Top Gear series 16 =

Top Gear
- Series 16
- Promotional poster
- Starring: Jeremy Clarkson; Richard Hammond; James May; The Stig
- No. of episodes: 8

Release
- Original network: BBC Two
- Original release: 21 December 2010 – 27 February 2011

Series chronology
- ← Previous; Series 15 Next → Series 17

Series 16 of Top Gear, a British motoring magazine and factual television programme, was broadcast in the United Kingdom on BBC Two during 2011, consisting of six episodes that were aired between 23 January and 27 February. Following the previous series, the BBC discontinued their involvement with Ben Collins on the programme, after he breached an agreement in his contract that forbid him disclosing his role as "The Stig" with the publication of his autobiography, The Man in the White Suit, in August 2010. His departure led to his replacement by a new driver by the beginning of the first episode, which was revealed as Phil Keen in 2024.

This series' highlights included a comparison test of the three similar second-hand convertibles, an attempt by the presenters to create a snowplough with a combine harvester, and a crossover piece with Top Gear Australia. The sixteenth series was preceded by two specials aired in December 2010. The first on 21 December, titled "East Coast Road Trip", featured studio segments and a celebrity segment, unlike other specials, while the second on 26 December, titled Top Gear: Middle East Special, was a feature-length special with the presenters travelling across the Middle East on a festive trip. The sixteenth series faced some criticism for comments regarding Mexicans and stereotypical views of Albanians.

== Episodes ==
No. overall	No. in series	Reviews	Features/challenges	Guest(s)	Original release date	UK viewers (millions)
126	1	None	"East Coast Road Trip": (Ferrari 458 Italia • Mercedes-Benz SLS AMG • Porsche 911 GT3 RS)	Danny Boyle	21 December 2010	7.13 (Note: 6.62 million on BBC Two, 506,000 on BBC HD.)
Clarkson, Hammond and May head for a road trip along the East Coast of the United States in three different cars - Clarkson in a Mercedes-Benz SLS AMG, May in a Ferrari 458 Italia, and Hammond in a Porsche 911 GT3 RS. Beginning in North Carolina, the trio test out their choices on a former NASCAR circuit, a lap around the Virginia International Raceway, and in a drive-by shooting challenge, before reaching New York City where they race across Manhattan to see who can land a spot on an American TV Show. Meanwhile, the boys take a look at some toys in the studio, while director Danny Boyle sees how he fares in the reasonably priced car. Note: Due to Ben Collins' departure, Tiff Needell was brought in to train Danny Boyle for his lap in the Kia Cee'd.
127	2	N/A – Middle East Special	Middle East Special: (BMW Z3 • Mazda MX-5 • Fiat Barchetta)	None	26 December 2010	7.68 (Note: 6.84 million on BBC Two, 836,000 on BBC HD.)
The presenters opt to re-enact the Three Wise Men's journey to Bethlehem with three second-hand two-seater convertibles bought on a budget of £3,500 - Clarkson picks a Mazda MX-5, Hammond chooses a Fiat Barchetta and May goes for a BMW Z3. Starting from northern Iraq, the trio try to make their way westward, dealing with war-torn landscapes, political borders, and tough terrain, along the way buying gifts in Damascus, testing out their cars in Jordan, and visiting the Sea of Galilee in Israel, before determining which is the best of the three as they close in on their destination and something unexpected neither of them expect to find. Note: The closing credits played out to the song "When a Child is Born" by Johnny Mathis, rather than the Top Gear theme tune.
128	3	Ariel Atom V8 • Škoda Yeti	History of the Porsche 911: Porsche 911 Turbo S Cabriolet vs Volkswagen Beetle	John Bishop • Sienna Miller • Tiff Needell	23 January 2011	7.38 (Note: 6.48 million on BBC Two, 903,000 on BBC HD.)
May heads to the track to look at the latest edition of the Atom, the Ariel Atom V8, while Clarkson decides to do a proper road test on the Skoda Yeti and see if a helicopter can land on it. Elsewhere, the boys introduce their new Stig, Hammond, while in South Africa, races against a Porsche 997 Turbo S Cabriolet in a one mile drag race against a Volkswagen Beetle with a difference, while comedian John Bishop gets his turn in the Kia Cee'd.
129	4	Ferrari 599 GTO	"Top Gear Ashes": British Hosts vs Top Gear Australia Hosts	Boris Becker • Jodie Kidd • Darryn Lyons • Steve Pizzati • Ewen Page • Shane Jacobson	30 January 2011	7.31 (Note: 6.38 million on BBC Two, 925,000 on BBC HD.)
Clarkson, Hammond and May have challenged the newest hosts of Top Gear Australia - Steve Pizzati, Ewen Page and Shane Jacobson - to a series of contests in the "Top Gear Ashes". Events include a Utility Vehicle Drag Race, a Double-Decker Race, Synchronized Donuts, and Sheep Herding, before ending with a Rally Race to see who will win the Ashes. Meanwhile, Clarkson showcases the extremely rare 1963 Ferrari 250 GTO and the 1980s era Ferrari 288 GTO, before handling the tricky Ferrari 599 GTO, while Boris Becker is aiming to get the Kia to a fast time on the track. Note: The main feature of this episode was part of a crossover with a special episode for Top Gear Australia, which featured additional footage of events involving the Australian presenters, including exclusive content for the special.
130	5	Super Hatchbacks: (Cosworth Impreza STI CS400 • Ford Focus RS500 • Volvo C30 PCP)	"Albania Road Trip": (Rolls-Royce Ghost • Zastava/Yugo Skala (substituting for a Bentley Mulsanne) • Mercedes-Benz S65 AMG)	Jonathan Ross	6 February 2011	7.33 (Note: 6.42 million on BBC Two, 912,000 on BBC HD.)
The trio head to Albania on a road trip with three cars to see which will be best for the "Albanian Mafia" - May believes the new Rolls-Royce Ghost will be suitable, Hammond thinks it will be the Mercedes-Benz S-Class AMG, while Clarkson proves it will be the "Bentley Mulsanne" (in reality, Bentley pulled out, so the Mulsanne was represented by a Zastava/Yugo Skala). On their trip, they see if they squeeze the "body" of a fat man into each car's boot, hold a drag race on an airfield, and try to escape from the Albanian police after "robbing a bank". Meanwhile, Clarkson compares the Cosworth Impreza STI CS400 with the Ford Focus RS500 and the one-off Volvo C30 PCP, while chat show host, Jonathan Ross, returns after 15 seasons to see how much improved he will be in the Kia Cee'd. Note: Jonathan Ross' Power Lap was originally planned for Series 15, but for unknown reasons it was postponed until this series.
131	6	Pagani Zonda R • Pagani Zonda Tricolore	Second-hand, four seater convertibles for £2,000: (BMW 325i Convertible)	Simon Pegg • Nick Frost	13 February 2011	7.28 (Note: 6.39 million on BBC Two, 893,000 on BBC HD.)
The presenters mistakenly buy the same second-hand car for a challenge - a BMW 325i within a budget of £2,000 - and thus create a new one to see how different their purchases are. Their tests soon see how different each car is, including in terms of performance, condition, and cost to repair, before they attempt to take their cars and become a stunt driving show for the Essex County Fair. Meanwhile, Clarkson tries out a high performance version of the Zonda, the Pagani Zonda R, along with a scaled-down version of the R, the Pagani Zonda Tricolore, while actors Simon Pegg and Nick Frost see who was fastest in the Kia.
132	7	BMW M3 Competition Pack • Audi RS5	Convert a combine harvester into a snow plough: (Claas Dominator)	Amber Heard	20 February 2011	6.87 (Note: 5.88 million on BBC Two, 989,000 on BBC HD.)
Following the snow problems caused in 2010 by a lack of snowplows and the money to run them, the presenters wonder if it might be cheaper to convert and utilise combine harvesters for the job when they are not helping to harvest crops. To find out, the trio convert a Claas combine harvester into a "snow-bine", complete with gritter and a flamethrower at the back (thanks to Clarkson). Finding that England is not expecting snow anytime soon, upon completing their creation, the trio opt to take it over to Norway, where in a series of tests, they struggle to clear a runway on a frozen lake, make a mess of things in a local village, before attempting to open up a mountain pass with the snow-bine. Elsewhere, Clarkson tries out both the BMW M3 Competition Pack and the Audi RS5 on the track, while Amber Heard is the latest star setting a lap time in the Kia Cee'd.
133	8	Porsche 959 • Ferrari F40 • Jaguar XJ 5.0 V8 Supersport	Sunset to sunrise race in a Jaguar XJ 5.0 V8 Supersport across England • NASA's latest Space Exploration Vehicle	John Prescott	27 February 2011	6.53 (Note: 5.63 million on BBC Two, 902,000 on BBC HD.)
Clarkson is in a race against "God", as he sets off from England's westernmost point at Land's End, Cornwall in a Jaguar XJ 5.0 V8 Supersport at sunset, and attempts to get to its most easterly point at Ness Point, Suffolk, before sunrise on the shortest night of Summer. Clarkson mistakenly says this is Britain's most westerly point. The most Westerly point in Britain is in fact Ardnamurchan Point in Scotland. Meanwhile, Hammond takes a look at his childhood heroes the Porsche 959 and the Ferrari F40, May gets to drive the Space Exploration Vehicle from NASA, and John Prescott arrives in a chorus of boos as he sees how he fared in the reasonably priced car. Note: The 'Car vs. The Sun (and God)' film was originally planned for Series 15, but for unknown reasons the film was postponed until this series.

== Criticism and controversy ==
=== Mexican comments ===
Following the broadcast of the second episode of Series 16, controversy arose from the episode's News segment and the discussion between the presenters about Mexico's first supercar. During the discussion, two of the hosts described Mexicans as being lazy and that no-one would complain because they were all too busy sleeping, provoking the Mexican ambassador, Eduardo Medina Mora, to accuse the presenters of resorting to "outrageous, vulgar and inexcusable insults to stir bigoted feelings against the Mexican people", while stating that the remarks were offensive, xenophobic and humiliating and reinforced negative stereotypes of Mexican people. While the BBC defended the presenters' anti-Mexican jokes, it apologised about some of the remarks made. Comedian Steve Coogan, however, criticised the programme for its pitiful apology following the broadcast, suggesting that the usual defence of "a bit of a laugh", or "harmless fun" was no longer appropriate, that the insults had gone too far, and described the comments as being "as funny as a cold sweat followed by shooting pains down the left arm". However, Mastretta appeared to have brushed off the insults, with general director Carlos Mastretta clarifying that the car was simply used as a pretext for the jokes, and that the controversy has increased interest in the MXT.

The Mexican comments were cut when the episode was broadcast in the United States and when the episodes were put on the BBC iPlayer.

=== Albanian Road Trip film ===
After the third episode of Series 16 was aired, the BBC received several complaints in regards to the road trip film, in which the presenters were finding a car suitable for the "Albanian Mafia". A number of complaints were directed to a segment of the film in which the presenters 'murdered' a fat Albanian and attempted to find out which of three car boots he would fit into the best, while the stereotypical views that Albania was a nest for mafia car thieves, were also criticised.

== Notes ==
The viewing figures shown in the Episode Table above, are a combination of the figures from the BBC Two broadcast and the BBC HD broadcast.
