= Top Gear Australia series 3 =

Top Gear Australia
- Season 3
- No. of episodes: 4

Release
- Original network: Nine Network
- Original release: 28 September 2010 – 5 May 2011

Series chronology
- ← Previous; Series 2 Next → Series 4

The third series of Top Gear Australia began on 28 September 2010 with a 75-minute Ashes Special featuring the presenters of both the Australian and UK Top Gear's competing in a series of challenges. This special was used a promotional tool by the Nine Network, who, as of late 2009, had acquired the airing rights to both the UK and Australian shows from SBS One. The series proper began 3 weeks later on 19 October. The show airs on Tuesday nights at 7:30pm on Channel Nine.

A number of changes were made by Nine for the 3rd series. Of the original hosts from SBS, only Steve Pizzati made the move, with new hosts Shane Jacobson & Ewen Page (editor-in-chief of Top Gear Australia magazine) replacing Warren Brown & James Morrison. while former Australian cricketer Shane Warne was added as an occasional guest reviewer. The test track at Camden Airport was redesigned and the 'Star Car' was replaced. The Proton Satria Neo used in the first 2 series on SBS made way for a more 'Australian' Ford XF Falcon Ute complete with bull bar, UHF CB aerial and stickers. (Nine also changed the name of the celebrity car challenge from 'Star In A Bog-Standard Car' to 'Star In A Car').

Due to the change in design of the Top Gear test track, in Episode 2 it was announced that the lap time leader board had been re-calibrated. The Stig drove 5 cars from the previous two seasons around the new track and a difference of +23.9% was calculated.

A two-disc DVD set of the third season, simply titled Top Gear Australia was released in March 2011. It contained all three episodes along with the Ashes Special.

== Episodes ==
No. overall	No. in season	Title	Reviews	Features/challenges	Guest(s)	Original release date	Viewers (millions)
17	—	"The Ashes Special"	None	Van drag race • Double decker cars • Synchronized donuts • Sheep hurdling • Rally race	Jeremy Clarkson • Richard Hammond • James May • British Stig	28 September 2010	N/A
18	1	Series 3, Episode 1	Morgan Aero SuperSport	Outback road trip in South Australia to Lake Eyre • V8 Lifesaving reel	Lisa McCune	19 October 2010	1.22
19	2	Series 3, Episode 2	Chevrolet Corvette ZR1	Can you use a V8 Supercar in the real world? • New Zealand mountain challenge	Michael Clarke	26 October 2010	1.07
20	3	Series 3, Episode 3	Lamborghini Gallardo LP550-2 • Caparo T1	Grey Nomad adventure on a budget	Craig Reucassel • Andrew Hansen	2 November 2010	0.93
21	4	Series 3, Episode 4	Hulme F1 • BMW X5M vs Porsche Cayenne Turbo S • HDT Blue Meanie	SUV vs People Mover (Ford Territory vs Kia Carnival)	Jimmy Barnes	5 May 2011	N/A

== Ratings ==
Episode	Original Airdate	Timeslot	Viewers^{1}	Nightly Rank (#)	Weekly Rank (#)
#1	19 October 2010	Tuesday; 7:30 P.M.	1,224,000	4	12
#2	26 October 2010	Tuesday; 7:30 P.M.	1,079,000	7	25
#3	2 November 2010	Tuesday; 7:30 P.M.	953,000	16	39

^{1} Viewer numbers are based on OzTAM data for Sydney, Melbourne, Brisbane, Adelaide and Perth combined.
