= Top Gear Australia series 1 =

Top Gear Australia
- Season 1
- No. of episodes: 8

Release
- Original network: SBS One
- Original release: 29 September – 17 November 2008

Series chronology
- Next → Series 2

The first series of Top Gear Australia was aired during 2008 on SBS One and consisted of eight episodes, beginning on 29 September and concluding on 17 November. The presenting line-up consisted of cartoonist Warren Brown, racing drivers Charlie Cox and Steve Pizzati, as well as the Australian cousin of the Stig. Based on the original UK version, the show's segments included "Power Laps", "Star in a Bog Standard Car", "What Where They Thinking?", "Old car commercials", "Stunts" and "V8 to the Rescue". The studio recordings took place at Bankstown Airport in Sydney. The power laps and the celebrity segments were recorded at Camden Airport with parts of the runways and taxiways used as a test track.

This was the only series to feature Cox as host, who left the show following series one. However, a second series was aired in 2009 due to the success of this series, with musician and episode 6 celebrity guest James Morrison replacing him.

== Episodes ==
No. overall	No. in season	Title	Reviews	Features/challenges	Guest(s)	Original release date	Viewers (millions)
1	1	Series 1, Episode 1	Porsche 911 Carrera S	Soft roaders: (Subaru Forester • Toyota RAV4 V6 • Nissan X-Trail) • Mini Moke Shark Cage	Vince Colosimo	29 September 2008	0.94
2	2	Series 1, Episode 2	Ford GT RHD • FPV F6 • HSV Clubsport	Utes at the Super Pit: (Nissan Navara • Ford Falcon XR6 Ute • Proton Jumbuck) • Smart Fortwo hearse	Steve Bisley	6 October 2008	0.66
3	3	Series 1, Episode 3	Mercedes-Benz CLK 63 AMG Black Series • BMW X6	$500 wrecks	Julia Zemiro	13 October 2008	0.66
4	4	Series 1, Episode 4	HSV W427 • Toyota Hilux TRD	GPS vs Aboriginal bush tracker • Lawn bowls: (Holden Astra)	Jack Thompson	20 October 2008	0.59
5	5	Series 1, Episode 5	Audi R8 • BMW 135i	Car into Yacht challenge • Toorak Tractor round town	Shannon Noll	27 October 2008	0.43
6	6	Series 1, Episode 6	Mercedes-Benz SL63 AMG	Outback Odyssey in 4x4s: (Audi Q7 • Range Rover • Lexus LX570)	James Morrison	3 November 2008	0.64
7	7	Series 1, Episode 7	Nissan GT-R • Subaru Impreza WRX STi	Subaru Impreza WRX STi vs Tiger ARH attack helicopter • Petrol vs. Diesel: (Volkswagen Golf TDI • Volkswagen Golf 2.0 FSI)	Greg Murphy • James Courtney	10 November 2008	0.60
8	8	Series 1, Episode 8	Jaguar XF	Holden vs Ford Round 2 • Ultimate Car for Ultimate Drive: (Aston Martin DB9 • Lamborghini Gallardo Superleggera • Porsche 911 Turbo)	Claudia Karvan	17 November 2008	0.66
