= Top Gear Australia series 2 =

Top Gear Australia
- Season 2
- No. of episodes: 8

Release
- Original network: SBS One
- Original release: 11 May – 29 June 2009

Series chronology
- ← Previous; Series 1 Next → Series 3

The second series of Top Gear Australia was aired during 2009 on SBS One and consisted if eight episodes, beginning on 11 May and concluding on 29 June. Warren Brown, Steve Pizzati and Australian cousin of the Stig returned for their second series, whilst James Morrison joined the programme replacing Charlie Cox, who left after series one.

This was the final series to be aired on SBS One, as the show moved to Nine Network for the third series. This was also the last series to feature Brown as host as well as the only one to have Morrison.

== Episodes ==
No. overall	No. in season	Title	Reviews	Features/challenges	Guest(s)	Original release date	Viewers (millions)
9	1	Series 2, Episode 1	Mitsubishi Lancer Evolution X • BMW 135i • Lamborghini Murcielago	Race from Federation Square to Portsea	Mark Skaife	11 May 2009	0.68
10	2	Series 2, Episode 2	Walkinshaw HSV Clubsport	Home-made electric cars (Suzuki MightyBoy • Holden Kingswood)	Ian Moss	18 May 2009	0.62
11	3	Series 2, Episode 3	Maserati GranTurismo S	Ute conversion (Prelude • Tarago)	Anh Do	25 May 2009	0.60
12	4	Series 2, Episode 4	Audi RS6 • HSV Clubsport R8 • Kia Soul	Ultimate drifting: (Ice cream van • stretch limo • truck)	Liesel Jones	1 June 2009	0.59
13	5	Series 2, Episode 5	Elfin T5 • Elfin MS8 Streamliner	Armoured limousines: (Combi Van • Statesman Series II • Mini Clubman)	H.G. Nelson	8 June 2009	0.54
14	6	Series 2, Episode 6	Pontiac G8 GXP • Nissan 370Z	Lawn mowers (Ferris IS 5100Z • Toyota Hilux • Musical engine)	Brendan Jones • Amanda Keller	15 June 2009	0.55
15	7	Series 2, Episode 7	Toyota FJ40 Landcruiser • Nissan Patrol	Smart car and Fiat 500 on the Oodnadatta Track	Gary Sweet	22 June 2009	0.51
16	8	Series 2, Episode 8	Ford Falcon GTHO Phase III • Lexus LS 600h L • Mercedes-Benz S320 CDI	Porsche Cayenne Diesel vs. Horse	Gyton Grantley	29 June 2009	0.48
