= Top Gear Australia series 4 =

Top Gear Australia
- Season 4
- No. of episodes: 6

Release
- Original network: Nine Network
- Original release: 30 August 2011 – 28 April 2012

Series chronology
- ← Previous; Series 3

The fourth series of the television series Top Gear Australia aired in Australia from 30 August 2011 until 28 April 2012, consisting of six episodes. The presenting line-up featured Steve Pizzati, Shane Jacobson, Ewen Page and The Stig.

This would be the last series of Top Gear as it was cancelled in 2012, due to declining ratings of the last two series.

A two-disc DVD set, titled Top Gear Australia: The Second Series on Nine was released in March 2012. It contained all three episodes of the fourth season, along with four unaired episodes from the third and fourth seasons. The unaired episodes from the fourth season were broadcast on GO! in April 2012.

== Episodes ==
No. overall	No. in season	Title	Reviews	Challenge	Guest(s)	Original release date
22	1	Series 4, Episode 1	Volvo S60 T6 • Toyota FJ Cruiser	Blind rallying	Andy Lee	30 August 2011
23	2	Series 4, Episode 2	Redback Spider	Audi R8 V10 Spyder vs. VW Amarok mountain race • Jet powered Daihatsu	Hamish Blake • Andy Lee	6 September 2011
24	3	Series 4, Episode 3	Chery J1	Drag racing • Modified Suzuki Mighty Boy	Shane Crawford • Wendell Sailor	13 September 2011
25	4	Series 4, Episode 4	Jaguar XJ • HSV Grange	Movie stunts	Glen Boss • Damien Oliver	7 April 2012
26	5	Series 4, Episode 5	FPV GT • Renault Clio RS	Attempting a new Peel P50 world speed record • V8 Sedan (FPV GT) vs Hot Hatch (Clio RS)	Natalie Gruzlewski	14 April 2012
27	6	Series 4, Episode 6	Holden Efijy • Mitsubishi MiEV • Toyota Prius • Holden Commodore • Ford ECOnetic	Beach buggy battle • Alternate fuel cars	Jamie Durie	28 April 2012
