= List of Top Gear Australia episodes =

The following is a complete episode list of the television series Top Gear Australia since its launch in 2008 on SBS One, and its subsequent move to the Nine Network in 2010. As of 13 September 2011, there have been 23 episodes spanning 4 seasons, as well as 1 promotional special, and the final episode of 4th season is currently not shown, because of the cancellation of the show. The show was presented by Steve Pizzati, Shane Jacobson, Ewen Page and The Stig. Pizzati was the only host to make the move from SBS to Nine, with Jacobson & Page replacing Warren Brown & James Morrison. Motorcycling commentator Charlie Cox presented in series 1.

== Series overview ==
Series	Episodes	Originally released			Average viewers (in millions)
Series	Episodes	First released	Last released	Network	Average viewers (in millions)
1	8	29 September 2008	17 November 2008	SBS	0.64
2	8	11 May 2009	29 June 2009	SBS	0.57
3	4	28 September 2010	2 November 2010	Nine Network	1.08
4	6	30 August 2011	28 April 2012	Nine Network	—N/a
5	8	17 May 2024	28 June 2024	Paramount+	—N/a

== Episodes ==
=== Series 1 (2008) ===
No. overall	No. in season	Title	Reviews	Features/challenges	Guest(s)	Original release date	Viewers (millions)
1	1	Series 1, Episode 1	Porsche 911 Carrera S	Soft roaders: (Subaru Forester • Toyota RAV4 V6 • Nissan X-Trail) • Mini Moke Shark Cage	Vince Colosimo	29 September 2008	0.94
2	2	Series 1, Episode 2	Ford GT RHD • FPV F6 • HSV Clubsport	Utes at the Super Pit: (Nissan Navara • Ford Falcon XR6 Ute • Proton Jumbuck) • Smart Fortwo hearse	Steve Bisley	6 October 2008	0.66
3	3	Series 1, Episode 3	Mercedes-Benz CLK 63 AMG Black Series • BMW X6	$500 wrecks	Julia Zemiro	13 October 2008	0.66
4	4	Series 1, Episode 4	HSV W427 • Toyota Hilux TRD	GPS vs Aboriginal bush tracker • Lawn bowls: (Holden Astra)	Jack Thompson	20 October 2008	0.59
5	5	Series 1, Episode 5	Audi R8 • BMW 135i	Car into Yacht challenge • Toorak Tractor round town	Shannon Noll	27 October 2008	0.43
6	6	Series 1, Episode 6	Mercedes-Benz SL63 AMG	Outback Odyssey in 4x4s: (Audi Q7 • Range Rover • Lexus LX570)	James Morrison	3 November 2008	0.64
7	7	Series 1, Episode 7	Nissan GT-R • Subaru Impreza WRX STi	Subaru Impreza WRX STi vs Tiger ARH attack helicopter • Petrol vs. Diesel: (Volkswagen Golf TDI • Volkswagen Golf 2.0 FSI)	Greg Murphy • James Courtney	10 November 2008	0.60
8	8	Series 1, Episode 8	Jaguar XF	Holden vs Ford Round 2 • Ultimate Car for Ultimate Drive: (Aston Martin DB9 • Lamborghini Gallardo Superleggera • Porsche 911 Turbo)	Claudia Karvan	17 November 2008	0.66

=== Series 2 (2009) ===
No. overall	No. in season	Title	Reviews	Features/challenges	Guest(s)	Original release date	Viewers (millions)
9	1	Series 2, Episode 1	Mitsubishi Lancer Evolution X • BMW 135i • Lamborghini Murcielago	Race from Federation Square to Portsea	Mark Skaife	11 May 2009	0.68
10	2	Series 2, Episode 2	Walkinshaw HSV Clubsport	Home-made electric cars (Suzuki MightyBoy • Holden Kingswood)	Ian Moss	18 May 2009	0.62
11	3	Series 2, Episode 3	Maserati GranTurismo S	Ute conversion (Prelude • Tarago)	Anh Do	25 May 2009	0.60
12	4	Series 2, Episode 4	Audi RS6 • HSV Clubsport R8 • Kia Soul	Ultimate drifting: (Ice cream van • stretch limo • truck)	Liesel Jones	1 June 2009	0.59
13	5	Series 2, Episode 5	Elfin T5 • Elfin MS8 Streamliner	Armoured limousines: (Combi Van • Statesman Series II • Mini Clubman)	H.G. Nelson	8 June 2009	0.54
14	6	Series 2, Episode 6	Pontiac G8 GXP • Nissan 370Z	Lawn mowers (Ferris IS 5100Z • Toyota Hilux • Musical engine)	Brendan Jones • Amanda Keller	15 June 2009	0.55
15	7	Series 2, Episode 7	Toyota FJ40 Landcruiser • Nissan Patrol	Smart car and Fiat 500 on the Oodnadatta Track	Gary Sweet	22 June 2009	0.51
16	8	Series 2, Episode 8	Ford Falcon GTHO Phase III • Lexus LS 600h L • Mercedes-Benz S320 CDI	Porsche Cayenne Diesel vs. Horse	Gyton Grantley	29 June 2009	0.48

=== Series 3 (2010) ===
No. overall	No. in season	Title	Reviews	Features/challenges	Guest(s)	Original release date	Viewers (millions)
17	—	"The Ashes Special"	None	Van drag race • Double decker cars • Synchronized donuts • Sheep hurdling • Rally race	Jeremy Clarkson • Richard Hammond • James May • British Stig	28 September 2010	N/A
18	1	Series 3, Episode 1	Morgan Aero SuperSport	Outback road trip in South Australia to Lake Eyre • V8 Lifesaving reel	Lisa McCune	19 October 2010	1.22
19	2	Series 3, Episode 2	Chevrolet Corvette ZR1	Can you use a V8 Supercar in the real world? • New Zealand mountain challenge	Michael Clarke	26 October 2010	1.07
20	3	Series 3, Episode 3	Lamborghini Gallardo LP550-2 • Caparo T1	Grey Nomad adventure on a budget	Craig Reucassel • Andrew Hansen	2 November 2010	0.93
21	4	Series 3, Episode 4	Hulme F1 • BMW X5M vs Porsche Cayenne Turbo S • HDT Blue Meanie	SUV vs People Mover (Ford Territory vs Kia Carnival)	Jimmy Barnes	5 May 2011	N/A

=== Series 4 (2011–12) ===
No. overall	No. in season	Title	Reviews	Challenge	Guest(s)	Original release date
22	1	Series 4, Episode 1	Volvo S60 T6 • Toyota FJ Cruiser	Blind rallying	Andy Lee	30 August 2011
23	2	Series 4, Episode 2	Redback Spider	Audi R8 V10 Spyder vs. VW Amarok mountain race • Jet powered Daihatsu	Hamish Blake • Andy Lee	6 September 2011
24	3	Series 4, Episode 3	Chery J1	Drag racing • Modified Suzuki Mighty Boy	Shane Crawford • Wendell Sailor	13 September 2011
25	4	Series 4, Episode 4	Jaguar XJ • HSV Grange	Movie stunts	Glen Boss • Damien Oliver	7 April 2012
26	5	Series 4, Episode 5	FPV GT • Renault Clio RS	Attempting a new Peel P50 world speed record • V8 Sedan (FPV GT) vs Hot Hatch (Clio RS)	Natalie Gruzlewski	14 April 2012
27	6	Series 4, Episode 6	Holden Efijy • Mitsubishi MiEV • Toyota Prius • Holden Commodore • Ford ECOnetic	Beach buggy battle • Alternate fuel cars	Jamie Durie	28 April 2012

=== Series 5 (2024) ===
Top Gear Australia (series 5)
