= Brothers' Nest =

- Official film poster
- Directed by: Clayton Jacobson
- Written by: Jaime Browne; Chris Pahlow
- Produced by: Jason Byrne; Clayton Jacobson
- Starring: Shane Jacobson; Clayton Jacobson
- Cinematography: Peter Falk
- Edited by: Clayton Jacobson; Sean Lander
- Music by: Richard Pleasance
- Release date: 11 March 2018 (South by Southwest)
- Running time: 97 minutes
- Country: Australia
- Language: English

Brothers' Nest is a 2018 Australian comedy-drama thriller film directed by Clayton Jacobson and starring him and his brother Shane Jacobson, reuniting the two after 2006's Kenny.

== Plot ==
One cold morning in Victoria, brothers Terry and Jeff arrive at the family home with plans to kill their stepfather, Rodger, who married into the family after the suicide of their biological father. Their motive is to get their dying mother to change her will and testament, as well as to take revenge on Rodger for being an irresponsible parent. Rodger is expected to return home at night to sell the family's horse. Jeff has carefully planned out the murder, intending to electrocute Rodger by killing him with a live radio thrown into a bathtub filled with water. In anticipation of their stepfather Rodger's arrival, Jeff prepares a to-do list, including cleaning the house of evidence, setting up an alibi of the brothers spending the weekend in Sydney, and rehearsing the murder. Terry reluctantly follows instructions, despite expressing fear and doubt towards his brother's intricate planning.

During the preparations, Terry has second thoughts about the crime, but Jeff is determined to carry through, leading to constant bickering. This ultimately results in Terry discovering that Jeff is in fact unemployed, and may be simply planning the murder as a means to inherit the family home and thus avoid bankruptcy. Their argument is cut short by the unexpected early arrival of Rodger, and Terry is forced to make conversation in order to stall for time. Rodger reveals that the reason he was so distant in the boys' childhoods was because Jeff was deeply traumatised by their father's suicide, and thought it would be best to give them some space. However, he eventually remembers the brothers' Sydney alibi, and Jeff is forced to reveal himself and ties Rodger up before throwing him into the bathtub. Terry, now regretting the plan, attempts to untie Rodger as Jeff leaves to fetch the radio, but he's unable to free him in time before Jeff throws the radio into the bath, killing Rodger.

The brothers start to clean up the scene, but their mother, who they thought was in hospital, had returned home with Rodger. She becomes impatient of waiting in the car, and enters the house to search for Rodger. Instead, she finds him dead in the bathtub, and grieves over his body while Terry and Jeff discuss their next move. Jeff suggests killing their mother too, which Terry vehemently rejects. As they argue, their mother approaches them and, seeing a pistol in Jeff's hands, taunts Jeff by insulting him and his biological father. Jeff shoots her to the horror of Terry. Terry runs out of the house, while Jeff remains inside and sets up the crime scene to frame Terry. Then, he follows Terry outside, and attempts to shoot Terry with the pistol. However, the gun clicks empty, and Terry reveals that he had removed the remaining bullets from the magazine, and was holding them in his hand. He scatters the ammunition on the floor and punches Jeff. Jeff starts to pick up the bullets to reload the gun, but Terry breaks his arm before he can do so. Jeff then runs away while continuing to reload, but Terry catches up and wrestles the pistol off him just as he finishes, causing the shots to go wide. Terry enters the house to retrieve a knife, and Jeff uses this opportunity to lock himself in Rodger's car, but is forced to come out after Terry sets the petrol tank on fire. Defeated, Jeff kills himself with the knife Terry handed him.

Another car, the buyer for the horse, pulls up to the house. Terry calmly makes conversation about the horse, seemingly oblivious of the carnage behind him as she surveys the scene in horror. As Terry leaves to fetch the horse, she calls the police, but is informed that there has already been a call. Terry returns with the horse just as police sirens can be heard in the distance. She asks him what happened here, to which Terry replies 'just some family stuff'.

== Cast ==
- Shane Jacobson as Terry
- Clayton Jacobson as Jeff
- Kym Gyngell as Rodger
- Lynette Curran as Mum
- Sarah Snook as Sandy

== Reception ==
On review aggregator website Rotten Tomatoes, the film holds an approval rating of 92%, based on 25 reviews, and an average rating of 6.7/10.

== Awards and nominations ==
Brothers' Nest was nominated for Best Original Screenplay and the inaugural Best Indie Film award at the 8th AACTA Awards.
