= List of Top Gear episodes =

List of Top Gear episodes may refer to:

- List of Top Gear (1977 TV series) episodes
- List of Top Gear (2002 TV series) episodes
- List of Top Gear (American TV series) episodes
- List of Top Gear Australia episodes
