= Top Gear Australia: Ashes Special =

2010 multi-national TV special

- Also known as: Top Gear: Ashes Special
- Presented by: Jeremy Clarkson; Richard Hammond; James May; Shane Jacobson; Ewen Page; Steve Pizzati; The Stig
- Country of origin: United Kingdom; Australia
- No. of episodes: 1

Production
- Running time: 90 minutes

Original release
- Network: Nine Network (AUS); BBC Two/BBC HD (UK)
- Release: 28 September 2010

Related
- Top Gear; Top Gear Australia,

Top Gear Australia: Ashes Special (also known simply as Top Gear: Ashes Special) is a special episode of the motoring series Top Gear Australia and Top Gear. It is part of the Channel Nine revamp of Top Gear Australia, which sees Australian hosts Ewen Page, Steve Pizzati and Shane Jacobson, take on the hosts of Top Gear UK, James May, Richard Hammond, and Jeremy Clarkson in a series of challenges involving the best and worst of British motoring, as well as a rally, and driving through a safari park. Other challenges include a drag race between a Holden VE Commodore ute and a standard looking Ford Transit van customised (unknowingly to the Australian presenters and Hammond) with a Jaguar XJ220 engine, and the double car race seen in Series 11 of Top Gear UK. An edited version of the Ashes Special was shown in the UK on 30 January 2011 as part of Series 16, Episode 2 of Top Gear UK.

== Format ==
The hosts of Top Gear Australia Shane Jacobson, Ewen Page, and Steve Pizzati are invited by Jeremy Clarkson, Richard Hammond, and James May to come to England and experience the best and worst of British motoring.

=== Preparation ===
The three Australian hosts are instructed to each get three cars on Britains worst car list and head to a Safari park. They experience Lions and Monkeys. After finishing they are instructed to repeat the trip in the Peel P50, the world's smallest road car. After finishing the trip, the trio encountered a Rhino that attempts to attack the cars. In the British version, the Australians were brought on in convict trucks, in reference to the history of Australia.

=== Round 1: Van Drag Race ===
Challenge: A drag race involving the two nations' most used vans. The Bruces using a HSV Maloo, whilst the Nigels used a (supposedly) lowly Ford Transit which turned out to be powered by a Jaguar XJ220 engine. Winner: The Nigels.

=== Round 2: Double decker cars ===
Challenge: A circuit race with double decker cars from Top Gear. The Australians had the top car placed upside down to "make them feel at home." Each team also had another driver. The Nigels had Jodie Kidd, whilst the Bruces had Darryn Lyons Winner: The Nigels.

=== Round 3: Synchronized Donuts ===
Challenge: Two hosts attempt to do donuts in sync with their partners. James May and Richard Hammond were elected as scorers for the event. The Australians won after Hammond mistakenly held up score cards totalling 11 points instead of the (pre-arranged) 1.1 as May did. Winner: The Bruces.

=== Round 4: Sheep Herding ===
Challenge: To herd a flock of sheep into a pen using off-road bikes. The Bruces were mistakenly given (better) Austrian KTM machines, whilst the Nigel's, using BSAs, lost a large number of points for completely losing the sheep. Winner: The Bruces.

=== Round 5: Rally race ===
Challenge: A rally circuit in the English country side. Steve Pizzati took on James May who was suspiciously dressed like The Stig! Winner: The Nigels.

=== Overall ===
Although admittedly, the British presenters cheated in every event they won; the final score was 3–2 to the Nigels.

== Presenters ==
The British hosts of Top Gear were:

- Jeremy Clarkson
- Richard Hammond
- James May
- The Stig (Ben Collins)

The Australian hosts of Top Gear were:

- Shane Jacobson
- Ewen Page
- Steve Pizzati
- The Stig (James Courtney)
