= Little Big Shots (Australian TV series) =

- Genre: Reality
- Created by: Ellen DeGeneres; Steve Harvey
- Based on: Little Big Shots by Ellen DeGeneres and Steve Harvey
- Presented by: Shane Jacobson
- Country of origin: Australia
- Original language: English
- No. of seasons: 2
- No. of episodes: 16

Production
- Production locations: Disney Studios, Sydney
- Running time: 60 mins (including commercials)
- Production company: Warner Bros. International Television Production

Original release
- Network: Seven Network
- Release: 27 August 2017 – 16 September 2018

Related
- Little Big Shots (US)

Little Big Shots is an Australian variety show which premiered on the Seven Network on 27 August 2017. The program, based on the American format of the same name, is hosted by Shane Jacobson and features performances by children aged 3 to 13 years old. The program is produced by Warner Bros. International Television Production.

The program was set to premiere on 16 July 2017, but was delayed due to the ratings success of Australian Ninja Warrior on rival channel Nine Network, it subsequently premiered on 27 August 2017. In September 2017, the series was renewed for a second season, this time featuring children aged 4 to 13.

Although the series did not return in 2019, auditions for a third season were announced in August 2019 for an expected broadcast in 2020. Seven ultimately postponed plans for the new season in January 2020 to an unspecified future date.

== List of acts ==
=== Season 1 (2017) ===
List of acts that appeared throughout the inaugural season.

Child	Age	Act	Location/ State
Agustin Candusso	7	Origami Expert	NSW
Akshat Singh	12	Viral Dancer	India
Albert Diab	12	Human Body Expert	NSW
Alexsa Kachan	7	Power Tumbler	NSW
Amelie Lu	9	Archer	VIC
Anke Chen	6	Pianist	China
Aralai Mattila-Mertens	9	Brazilian Jiu Jitsu	NSW
Arat Hosseini	3	Wall Climber	Iran
Bella Devyatkina	4	Polyglot	Russia
Bella Grosse	11	Horse Trickster	NSW
Campbell Remess	13	Teddy Bear Maker	TAS
Charlie Dunn	5	Sheep Shearer	NSW
Charlie Parker	7	Reptile Ranger	VIC
Charlotte Bartlett-Nealeigh	9	Knife Throwers	US
Grennan Bartlett-Nealeigh	12	Knife Throwers	US
Declan Sander	6	Spelling Champion	VIC
Eduarda Henklein	7	Drummer	Brazil
Emerald Gordon Wulf	11	Contortionist	USA
Evan Luc-Tran	8	Photographic Memory Holder	NSW
Evnika Saadvakass	10	Boxer	Kazakhstan
Ewan Chate	11	Pogo Stick Jumper	NSW
Gisele Messina	11	Latin and Ballroom Dancers	NSW
Yoni Herz	13	Latin and Ballroom Dancers	NSW
Harley Jackson	11	Unicycling Bagpiper	NSW
Lennox Carolan	5	Wrestlers	NSW
Harmony Carolan	7	Wrestlers	NSW
Zenon Pate	10	Wrestlers	NSW
Ryder Pate	12	Wrestlers	NSW
Phoenix Pate	13	Wrestlers	NSW
Liam Carolan	14	Wrestlers	NSW
Jacob Cousins	9	Haka Leader	NSW
Jayden Dinga	12	Snooker Trickster	QLD
Jett Simmons	9	Lawn Bowler	VIC
Jianyu Que	12	Rubik's Cube Genius	China
Jude Owens-Fleetwood	10	Violinists	SA
Lewis Owens-Fleetwood	5	Violinists	SA
Li-sa X	12	Guitarist	Japan
Louis Rebeiro	11	Pianist (Blues)	WA
Lucas Lum	8	Table Tennis Champions	VIC
Nicholas Lum	12	Table Tennis Champions	VIC
Mater Vandeleur	9	Journalist	SA
Micah June	7	Hip-Hop Dancer	NSW
Ned Eliott	10	Lawn Mower Racer	NSW
Nikita Leskovec	11	Animal Impersonator	VIC
Ocean Brown	5	Skateboarders	Japan
Sky Brown	9	Skateboarders	Japan
Om Swaroop	7	Limbo Skater	India
Parker O’Neile	8	Rodeo Roper	NSW
Rafael Nselel	5	Memory Extraordinaire	VIC
Selevasio Tu’ima	14	Maori Singer	NZ
Sofia Bogdanova	11	Roller Skater	Russia
Thomas Petrie	7	Champion Whip Cracker	QLD
Torino Brodie	7	Goat Shower	QLD
Tyrone Snell	8	Science Professor	QLD
Vienna-Rose Bahn	5	Hula Dancers	VIC
Elyssa Kaberry	6	Hula Dancers	VIC
Ligipati Kamupala	7	Hula Dancers	VIC
Nadine Daniel	8	Hula Dancers	VIC
Victoria (Terina) Iwugia	8	Hula Dancers	VIC
Viniana Lili Passi	8	Hula Dancers	VIC
Will Gaskett	10	Frisbee Trickster	VIC
Xiong Fei	10	Latin Dancer	CHINA
Zane Weinberg	7	Golfer	NSW

=== Season 2 (2018) ===
Child	Age	Act	Location/ State
Archie	5	Wood Chopper	QLD
Felix	9	Bubble Artist	Germany
Ryusei Imai	7	Mini Bruce Lee	Japan
Isabelle Bitsikas	10	Contemporary Dancer	VIC
Aberham Gamo	11	Foot Juggler	Ethiopia
Shanaia Brady	8	Opera Singer	QLD
Esther	5	Mini Shakespeare Poet	NSW
Jak	9	Auctioneer	QLD
Bella Gantt	11	Foot Archer	USA
Mikayla "Mikky" Strickling	11	Inventor	NSW
Titus	7	Global Basketball Trick shooter	USA
Joel & Kayla	10	Champion Trampolinists	NSW
Tavaris Jones	6	Viral Dance Sensation	USA
Marcus		Drummer	VIC
Lil' Mushroom	8	Pop n locker dancer	China
Max Cosgrove	10	Chicken Farmer	QLD
Nikita Bychkov	10	Aerialists	Ukraine
Katya Buskandze	8	Aerialists	Ukraine
Down to Bhangra	8–9	Indian Dance Troupe	NSW
Rhys	12	Dog Agility Expert	QLD
Ceyda Altug		Artistic Cyclist	Germany
Daniel	6	Geography Expert	WA
Luca	9	Car Expert	NSW
Channah Zeitung	10	Taekwondo Champion	USA
Tsehay Hawkins	12	African Fusion Dancer	NSW
Ruby	8	Dog Groomer	QLD
Lockie Coburn	12	Scooter Champion	QLD
Alexis, Evan and Hugo		Mini Chefs	NSW
Blake Whitestyles	4	Boxer	QLD
Francis Concepcion	12	Singing Trio	Philippines
Mackie Empuerto	13	Singing Trio	Philippines
Keifer Sanchez	14	Singing Trio	Philippines
Cierra Shook	9	Cheerleader	VIC
Lotima "General Fiyah" Pome'e	12	Reggae Artist	NZ
Maxx Benoit	8	Mini Zoologist	QLD
Jeffrey	10	Break Dancer	NSW
Kristine	10	Qanun Musician	Armenia
Phoenix	8	World's Strongest Kid	USA
Jersey Mae	7	Fiery Dancer	NSW
Ramona	8	Mini Weightlifter	WA
Eishin	10	Slackliner	Japan
Sonny	11	Country Singer	NSW
Nayan	10	Fashion Designer	NSW
Elias and Zion	11	Twin Musicians	USA
Owyn	4	Camel Handlers	VIC
Charlotte	9	Camel Handlers	VIC
Shun-P		Soccer Trickster	Japan
Harry	10	Flamenco Guitarist	Canada
Emily	11	Pole Acrobat	Ukraine
Aelita Andre		Abstract Artist	VIC
Charlie	12	Pro Yo-Yoer	VIC

== Ratings ==
=== Season 1 (2017) ===
No.	Title	Air date	Timeslot	Overnight ratings		Consolidated ratings		Total viewers	Ref(s)
No.	Title	Air date	Timeslot	Viewers	Rank	Viewers	Rank	Total viewers	Ref(s)
1	Episode 1	27 August 2017	Sunday 7:00 pm	1,672,000	1	116,000	1	1,788,000	
2	Episode 2	3 September 2017	Sunday 7:00 pm	1,305,000	1	116,000	1	1,421,000	
3	Episode 3	10 September 2017	Sunday 7:00 pm	1,232,000	3	105,000	3	1,337,000	
4	Episode 4	17 September 2017	Sunday 7:00 pm	1,154,000	3	80,000	2	1,234,000	
5	Episode 5	24 September 2017	Sunday 7:00 pm	1,022,000	5	75,000	2	1,097,000	
6	Episode 6	1 October 2017	Sunday 7:00 pm	757,000	6	69,000	7	826,000	
7	Episode 7	8 October 2017	Sunday 7:00 pm	881,000	6	63,000	5	944,000	
8	Episode 8	15 October 2017	Sunday 7:00 pm	893,000	5	57,000	6	950,000	

=== Season 2 (2018) ===
No.	Title	Air date	Timeslot	Overnight ratings		Consolidated ratings		Total viewers	Ref(s)
No.	Title	Air date	Timeslot	Viewers	Rank	Viewers	Rank	Total viewers	Ref(s)
1	Episode 1	5 August 2018	Sunday 7:00 pm	963,000	4	58,000	4	1,021,000	
2	Episode 2	12 August 2018	Sunday 7:00 pm	878,000	4	49,000	5	927,000	
3	Episode 3	19 August 2018	Sunday 7:00 pm	883,000	4	59,000	4	942,000	
4	Episode 4	26 August 2018	Sunday 7:00 pm	864,000	4	34,000	4	898,000	
5	Episode 5	2 September 2018	Sunday 7:00 pm	719,000	5	43,000	5	762,000	
6	Episode 6	9 September 2018	Sunday 7:00 pm	768,000	6	34,000	6	802,000	
7	Episode 7	10 September 2018	Monday 7.30 pm	605,000	14	37,000	14	642,000	
8	Episode 8	16 September 2018	Sunday 7:00 pm	827,000	4	20,000	4	847,000	
