= Kenny's World =

- Genre: Parody/Mockumentary
- Created by: Clayton Jacobson; Shane Jacobson
- Starring: Shane Jacobson
- Country of origin: Australia
- Original language: English
- No. of seasons: 1
- No. of episodes: 9

Production
- Running time: 30 minutes

Original release
- Network: Network Ten
- Release: 10 September – 11 November 2008

Kenny's World is an Australian television mockumentary on Network Ten that is a spin-off from the 2006 mockumentary film Kenny.

The series stars Shane Jacobson, reprising his role of Kenny Smyth, Australia's favourite portaloo plumber who scours the globe for bizarre, intriguing and often downright ridiculous examples of toilet technology. The show was canned after one season due to poor ratings and reception. Places Kenny travels to during the course of the series include the world's fastest Porta-loo in Indianapolis, Egypt's City of the Dead, and The World Toilet Summit and the Expo in India.

== Episodes ==
No.	Title	Directed by	Written by	Original release date	Viewers
1	"Australia to Japan"	Clayton Jacobson	Ray Boseley & Clayton Jacobson	10 September 2008	1,128,000
2	"Japan to Taiwan"	Clayton Jacobson	Ray Boseley & Clayton Jacobson	17 September 2008	1,000,000
3	"China to Singapore"	Clayton Jacobson	Ray Boseley & Clayton Jacobson	24 September 2008	754,000
4	"Thailand to U.S.A"	Clayton Jacobson	Ray Boseley & Clayton Jacobson	1 October 2008	664,000
5	"U.S.A/Italy/Luxembourg"	Clayton Jacobson	Ray Boseley & Clayton Jacobson	14 October 2008	890,000
6	"Egypt"	Clayton Jacobson	Ray Boseley & Clayton Jacobson	21 October 2008	773,000
7	"Germany to Russia"	Clayton Jacobson	Ray Boseley & Clayton Jacobson	28 October 2008	811,000
8	"Sweden/Denmark/UK"	Clayton Jacobson	Ray Boseley & Clayton Jacobson	4 November 2008	806,000
9	"India"	Clayton Jacobson	Ray Boseley & Clayton Jacobson	11 November 2008	805,000
