= Mighty Car Mods =

- Mighty Car Mods Logo
- Genre: Documentary, comedy, mini-series, cars
- Created by: Blair Joscelyne; Martin Mulholland
- Theme music composer: Blair Joscelyne
- Opening theme: Gavin Tyrell
- Country of origin: Australia
- Original language: English
- No. of seasons: 12
- No. of episodes: 565

Production
- Production location: Sydney
- Running time: 20–40 mins

Original release
- Release: December 14, 2007

Mighty Car Mods is a YouTube channel that focuses on DIY car modifications and car culture. Created by Blair "Moog" Joscelyne and Martin "Marty" Mulholland in 2008, the show has focussed on car culture through Australia, with most episodes centred around buying, modifying and testing vehicles with various budgets.

While typically based in Sydney, Marty and MOOG have travelled extensively to showcase car culture from across the world, creating various extended episodes, as well as multiple feature-length films from these experiences. They have filmed in locations including Japan, Cuba, Germany, the UAE, United States of America, Switzerland, the UK and New Zealand. Marty and MOOG also host 'The Unicorn Circuit' on their MCMtv2 YouTube channel, which keeps fans up to date with automotive news and includes fan submissions.

== History ==
In 2007, Long-time friends and car lovers Marty and MOOG decided to start making videos to show fellow enthusiasts the ease with which you can modify a vehicle, regardless of your automotive knowledge or qualifications. The aim was to educate and inform their audience with a dash of Aussie humour, allowing amateurs to feel confidence to modify their cars (within the law) while achieving a sense of satisfaction and ownership from bestowing personality on a stock vehicle. Mighty Car Mods debuted on YouTube in January 2008, with the first video ("How to pimp your car for $500") showcasing the pair completing basic modifications and upgrades typical to the period on MOOG's 2001 Daihatsu Cuore.

Outside of Mighty Car Mods, Marty has worked in the music/audio production industry and is a sound engineer by trade, while MOOG is a composer and music producer whose work can be heard in commercials for Telstra, Arnotts, Optus, Amex, Ford, BMW, Coles Supermarkets, Loveable Lingerie, IBM, L’Oreal, Heinz, OPSM, Subaru, Origin, Lexus, Jetstar, Touchstone Pictures, Visa Inc, Mazda, Cascade Brewery, Discovery Channel, Renault, Wrigley Company, and Village Cinemas. He has released a number of solo albums and he has been involved with a variety of different bands and musical projects.

In 2022, Mighty Car Mods opened a Collaborative workspace named 'Super Garage' in Sydney, Australia

On 17 August 2026, a selection of the MCM videos was added to the National Film & Sound Archive alongside 9 other creators in a collaborative partnership with YouTube, this collection includes physical items from the channels history to be displayed in Canberra alongside the videos.

== Format ==
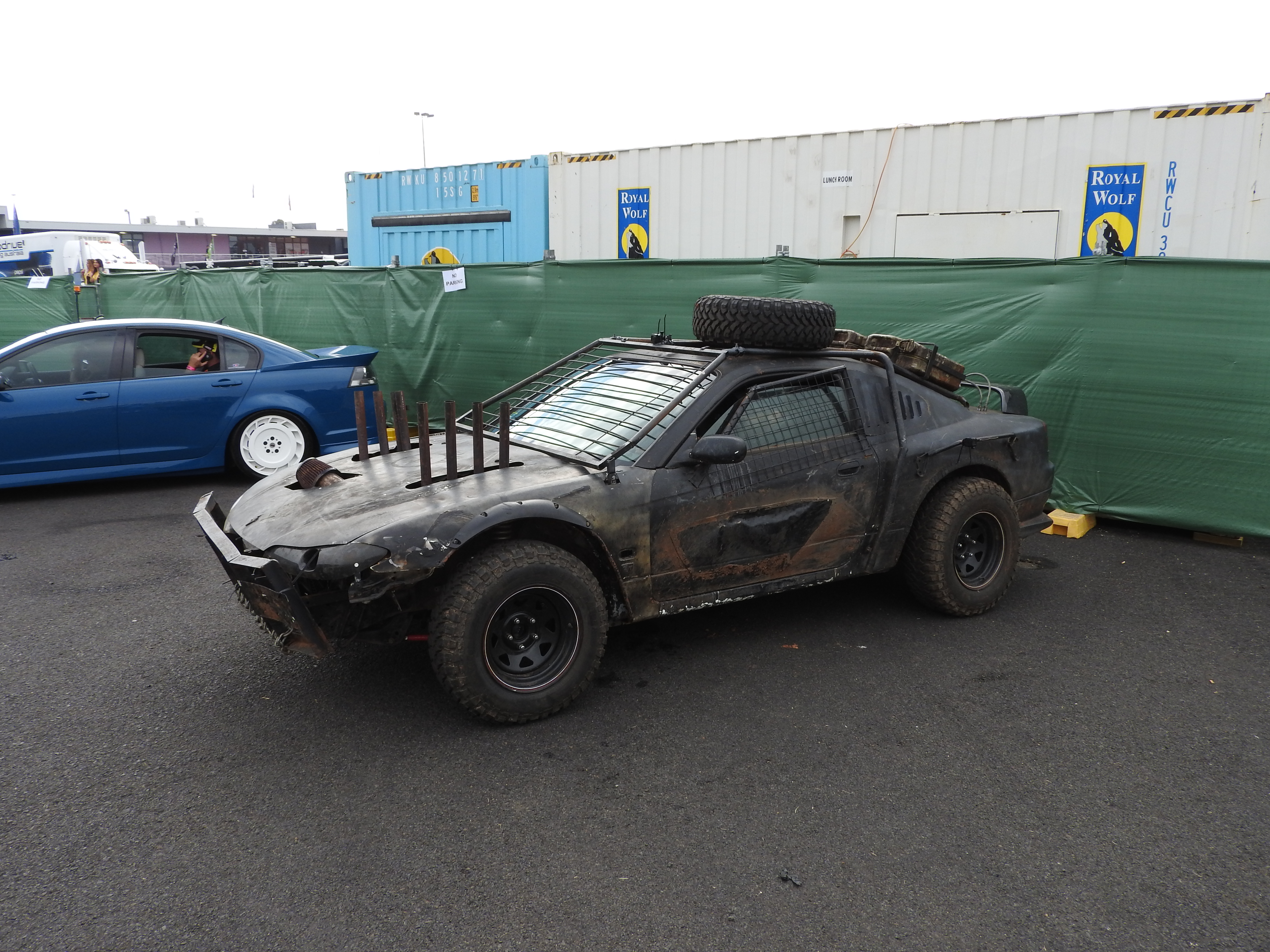
Nissan Silvia S15 a.k.a. Mod Max

The general format for episodes involves buying different cars and modifying them in a particular style or for a particular purpose. Vehicles are typically from what is colloquially known as "late-model Japanese and European tuning" scene with cars ranging in age from the mid-1980s through the 2000s. However, MCM has also done builds on classic Australian cars (HQ Holden), as well as near-new Japanese (Subaru BRZ) and European (Audi RS3, VW Golf R, Lotus Exige S240) vehicles.

Episodes generally commence with a semi-animated introduction, created by Gavin Tyrell, followed by Marty and MOOG giving either an introduction to the project or a rundown of previous episode's highlights. Episodes vary in duration, from 15 to 60 minutes, but most will typically run about 20 minutes.

Sometimes Marty and MOOG will set a challenge to each buy a car with a particular constraint (budget or style of car), and build it independent of each other. The goal of these series is to then battle head-to-head in a series of challenges. Recently MCM has also participated in "Catch and Release" episodes where vehicles are brought in for only one or two episodes, then moved on. Other builds run for months due to the complexity and scale of the modifications being undertaken.

Typically, cars featured in builds will be given a name—often a pun such as Yaris Hilton or Taylor Drift—to build an identity with viewers. The show was originally filmed on Marty's mother's driveway and garage, but was moved to a private indoor location in Sydney in 2015, following issues with people posting spoilers or causing traffic issues in the suburban street.

The MCM duo have released several critically acclaimed feature-length films documenting automotive-focused travel, such as Turbos and Temples, Kei to the City, Chasing Midnight, Turbos and Temples II, The Cars of Cuba, and most recently; Turbos & Temples III. MCM are the first Australian-produced automotive show to be aired globally on Discovery Channel, and MCM also appears on Qantas in-flight entertainment.

Some vehicles that were featured in the films, such as the Daihatsu Mira TR-XX in 'Kei to the City', and the Nissan March Super Turbo in 'Turbos & Temples II' have eventually led to the duo making multiple extended series, after having them imported from Japan and remodified or retrofitted to comply with the safety regulations set by Australia's Road laws.

All music used in the show and associated films is composed and produced by MOOG, with editing and uploading handled by both he and Marty. The mix of technical content with irreverent humor and high production quality has found a fanbase among a wide demographic of people. This has led to Mighty Car Mods videos being viewed more than 950 million times, making MCM one of the most successful shows of its type on YouTube.

== Cast ==
Marty typically shows more hands-on mechanical experience in videos, while MOOG will often handle creative tasks involving design or aesthetics. Due to their background as amateur mechanics Marty and MOOG will sometimes enlist the help of industry-qualified experts for complex builds.

Special guests include Miles "Dose Vader" Stinton, Scott "Tuning Fork" Hilzinger, Benny "Mechanical Stig" Neal, and Alan "Turbo Yoda" Butler. Typically, these guests are known by their nicknames, with Turbo Yoda (with his offsider, Ben "Woody" Wood) now hosting The Skid Factory from his home in Queensland, while Mechanical Stig fronts the Benny's Custom Works channel. Tuning Fork works at Haltech, while Dose Vader runs AM Auto in Noosaville in Queensland.

== Project cars ==
The year shown is when the project began.

Project Year	Car Manufacturer	Model	Nickname/Information	First Appearance
2008	Nissan	March Super Turbo		
2009	Ford	Laser	'TRDLZR'	
2009	Mazda	323	Roof chopped to make a "Convertible"	
2010	Nissan	Pathfinder	'Zombie Proof'	
2011	Subaru	Liberty		
2011	Nissan	Silvia (S15)		How To Buy a Japanese Car (In Japan)
2011	Subaru	Forester XT	'MOOGARU'	Subaru Forester XT
2011	Daihatsu	Cuore	Budget Show Car	
2011	Subaru	Fiori	$50 DIY Stereo	
2011	Daihatsu	Cuore	'The Blue Turd'	
2011	Honda	Civic		
2012	Mitsubishi	Galant	'The Off-Brand Takumi'	
2012	Toyota	Cressida	'Old Man Sleeper'	
2012	Daihatsu	Charade	Supercharged using Leaf Blowers	
2012	Volkswagen	Golf (MK3)	'Budget Street Cred'	
2013	Nissan	180SX	First iteration of what becomes 'Tay Tay'	Moog Buys Marty A Car
2013	Mazda	MX-5	1990 MX-5 NA	
2013	Nissan	Figaro		
2014	Subaru	Liberty (BG/BP)	'Supergramps': Revival of the first iteration of 'Gramps', a 2nd generation Liberty (Legacy) wagon (BG)/EZ36 H6-Turbo swap. Was colloquially known as "The 11 Second Car"	Gramps – the 11 Second Car (BG) Supergramps – Part 1 (BP)
2015	Nissan	Silvia (S15)	'Mod Max', General Motors LS engine swap	
2015	Mini	Cooper	JDM model, with Honda B16B Engine Swap	
2015	Volkswagen	Beetle	'Miss Daisy' Subaru EJ25 swap	
2016	Mitsubishi	Lancer	'2SEXY'	
2016	Nissan	180SX	'Tay Tay', 180SX project car from 2013 repurchased	MOOGS NEW CAR!
2017	Nissan	350Z	'3FIDDY'	
2017	Daihatsu	Mira	The Main Feature for the film 'Kei to the City' – An Australian-market model, retrofitted with the then imported JDM Mira TR-XX X4 from the film to comply with Australia's Road laws.	Kei to the City [Drift Feature Film – Japan]
2018	Holden	Kingswood (HQ)	Police Car livery, General Motors LS engine swap	
2018	Mitsubishi	Lancer	'2TWISTD', Mitsubishi 4G63 engine swap	
2018	Nissan	240Z	Nissan RB26 engine swap, later the engine parts were upgraded, the turbo is reverted to a single Garrett G30660 single turbo rather than the original twin turbo configuration	Buying a rare JDM 240Z from Japan - FINALE
2019	Mitsubishi	Mitsubishi Lancer Evolution 9		
2019	Subaru	Outback	'OUTFAP'	
2019	Toyota	Yaris	'Yaris Hilton'	Introducing: YARIS HILTON
2019	Volkswagen	Golf R (Mk7)		
2020	BMW	3 Series (E30)	'Black Ch-Ops', General Motors LS engine swap	BLACK CH-OPS
2020	Lotus	Exige Sport 240		
2020	Daihatsu	Hijet Tipper	Full Custom turbocharger install	
2020	Subaru	Impreza WRX STi (2-door)		
2020	Subaru	BRZ		Moog's New Car (Does Good Skids)
2020	Toyota	MR2	'Mr. Poo'	Turns out my 'super clean' Toyota MR2 turbo is a piece of ....
2020	Suzuki	Jimny		Our First 4X4 Build (SO MANY MODS!!)
2021	Honda	Civic (EP)		
2021	Mazda	RX-7 (FB)		
2022	Daihatsu	Midget		
2022	Nissan	180SX		180SX – DREAM BUILD
2022	Nissan	March Super Turbo	The main feature for 'Turbos & Temples 2'. A successor of Martin's first March Super Turbo in 2008	Turbos & Temples 2
2022	Subaru	Levorg	Impreza WRX STi engine and manual drivetrain swap/upgraded with an EZ30 H6-Turbo swap (known by Martin as 'Hypergramps' in lieu of 'Supergramps' and 'Gramps' prior)	
2022	Toyota	Hilux		We Bought the CHEAPEST HILUX in Australia (then fixed it in ONE DAY)
2022	Toyota	GR Yaris		
2022	Volkswagen	Golf R (Mk8)		Should you buy one? | The Good, The Bad & The Ugly]
2022	Volkswagen	Up	It is converted into Up GTI configuration	Trying to Guess Marty's New Car (Blindfolded!)
2023	Suzuki	Swift		
2023	Peugeot	206		
2023	Daihatsu	Cuore		I Bought Marty a New Car (why doesn't he like it?)
2024	Isuzu	Gemini	Building Marty's first ever car. The fastest pizza delivery car in Australia	My First Car (but better) Isuzu Gemini Build
2024	Volkswagen	Amarok		We Built The WORLDS BEST 4X4
2024	Daihatsu	Copen		A NEW CAR! it's the best JDM Convertible Sports car EVER MADE
2024	Toyota	RAV4		OUR NEW PROJECT CAR!
2024	Nissan	Cube		MY NEW PROJECT CAR - SuperCharged!
2025	Mazda	MX-5 (NC)		My NEW CAR is FASTER THAN YOURS!
2025	Nissan	Skyline (R32)		I BOUGHT THE CHEAPEST GT-R IN THE WORLD
2025	Ford	Falcon (XR8)		I BOUGHT THE CHEAPEST V8 IN THE COUNTRY
2025	Mazda	RX-7 (FD)		FD RX7 The Ultimate Rotary Sports Car
2026	Subaru	Impreza	'4DMILF'	Buying A Modified Car Off Marketplace (Without Seeing It First)
2026	Mitsubishi	Lancer	'4DMILK'	Buying ANOTHER Sexspec Car off Marketplace (SIGHT UNSEEN)
2026	Honda	City	Honda City Turbo II, The Main feature for the film 'Kei to the City 2'	KEI TO THE CITY 2 (Automotive Feature Film - Japan)
2026	Mini	Cooper	'Mini Cooper S JCW'	We Tried To Get SCAMMED on Facebook Marketplace Buying Cars
2026	Mercedes	E43	'Mercedes-AMG E43 Wagon'	I Imported the best value car of all time (from Japan!)
2026	BMW	M140i	'BMW M140i'	I Finally Bought One (Yes It's Good)
2026	Daihatsu	Charade	'Mr Gold Charade'	I bought the Cheapest Modified Show Car In The Country (Without inspecting it first)
2026	Holden	Monaro	'Barranaro'	I just bought the BEST V8 EVER MADE!
2026	Subaru	Legacy	'GTB E-Tune'	My NEW Car will be the most powerful EVER

== Reception ==
Part of MCM's success stems from the hosts' relatability as everyman car enthusiast, as well as their humorous and laconic nature, and their desire to tackle complex tasks and learn new skills along the way. Their first feature-length film titled Turbos and Temples was well received by critics and motoring fans when it premiered at Hoyts Cinema, Fox Studios, in Sydney. So far their videos have garnered more than 950 million views on YouTube, with almost five billion impressions.

MCM used to publish a digital magazine, which is still available on their web store along with digital downloads of MOOG's music and show merchandise. In 2018, to celebrate their 10th anniversary, Mighty Car Mods released a limited-edition hardcover 128-page book titled The Cars of Mighty Car Mods, featuring illustrations of all the cars they worked on in their first 10 years. This was updated for 2019 with a further 30 cars added and The Cars of Mighty Car Mods: Modified Edition.
