= Clayton Jacobson (director) =

Australian filmmaker and musician

- Occupations: Film director, writer, producer, actor, editor
- Years active: 1989–present
- Relatives: Shane Jacobson (brother)

Clayton Jacobson is an Australian film director, writer, producer, actor, musician, and editor. His debut feature film was Kenny, which was released in 2006 in Australia to critical acclaim, winning a number of awards. He has acted in a number of films, including Animal Kingdom (2010).

== Early life and education ==
Clayton Jacobson is the brother of Kenny actor Shane Jacobson.

He graduated from the Swinburne Film & TV School.

== Career ==
Jacobson began his career editing music videos and features films. He then directed music videos, television commercials, and short films until making his debut as a feature film director with Kenny in 2006.

Jacobson first had the idea of improving the green screen technology in use for filming special effects when filming a TV ad for detergent in 2003. Watching his son playing videogames and seeing the 3D technology used in them gave him the basic idea for developing on-set virtual production. In 2016, Jacobson and his son made one of the first prototypes for a virtual production stage in their shed, using a set of LED screens. However, he could not get anyone to take an interest in developing the technology further, so gave up on it. Other filmmakers had also caught on to the idea though, and in 2018 Australian cinematographer Greig Fraser used the technology to film the Star Wars franchise spin-off series, The Mandalorian (released 2019).

== Awards and nominations ==
=== Kenny ===
Kenny received several awards and nominations, including:

- 2006: Australian Film Institute (AFI) Awards
  - Nominated - Best Film (Clayton Jacobson, Rohan Timlock), Best Direction (Clayton Jacobson), Best Original Screenplay (Shane Jacobson, Clayton Jacobson), Best Editing (Clayton Jacobson, Sean Lander), Best Supporting Actor (Ronald Jacobson);
  - Won - Best Lead Actor (Shane Jacobson);
- 2006: Film Critics Circle of Australia
  - Won - Best Actor (Shane Jacobson), Best Original Screenplay;
  - Nominated: Best Film, Best Director;
- 2006: IF Awards
  - Won - Best Feature Film, Best Script (Clayton Jacobson, Shane Jacobson), Best Sound (Craig Carter, Peter Smith), Box Office Achievement;
  - Nominated - Best Director (Clayton Jacobson), Best Editing (Clayton Jacobson, Sean Lander)

=== Brothers' Nest ===
Brothers' Nest (2020), directed by Jacobson, was nominated for the inaugural AACTA Award for Best Indie Film in the 8th edition of the AACTA Awards.

== Personal life ==
Jacobson plays double bass in the Appalachian folk band the Duck Downpickers.

== Filmography ==
Jacobson has been involved in the making of the following films:

=== As director, producer, and writer ===
Year	Film	Type	Credited as		
Year	Film	Type	Director	Writer	Producer
1994	EnvironMental	Short Film	Yes		
2001	Tickler	Short Film	Yes	Yes	Yes
2002	I Love U	Short Film	Yes		
2002	Tanaka	Short Film	Yes		
2006	Kenny	Feature Film	Yes	Yes	Yes
2008	Kenny's World	Television Series	Yes	Yes	
2009	Mordy Koots	Web Series	Yes	Yes	
2018	Brothers' Nest	Feature Film	Yes		Yes
2019	Mr. Black	Television Series	Yes		

=== As editor ===
Year	Film	Notes
1989	Houseboat Horror	

=== As actor ===
Year	Film	Role	Type
1988	Smoke 'Em If You Got 'Em		Feature film
2001	He Died with a Felafel in His Hand	Repo Man	Feature film
2001	Tickler	Man	
2003	Buried	Angus	Short film
2003	Ned Kelly	Sullivan	Feature film
2003	Roundabout	Paramedic 1	Short film
2003	Take Away	Waster 2	Feature film
2005	The Illustrated Family Doctor	Phil	Feature film
2005	Blacktown	Clayton	Feature film
2006	The Water Diary	Lunch Guest	Short film
2006	Kenny	David Smyth	Feature film
2010	Animal Kingdom	Gus Emery	Feature film
2017	Top of the Lake	Adrian Butler	TV series, season 2, episode: "China Girl"
2018	Upgrade	Manny	Feature film
2018	Brothers' Nest	Jeff	Feature film
2019	Metro Sexual	Bruce the Bikie	
2025	Cook Serve Forever	Baz	Video game
