= Top Gear: Middle East Special =

- Top Gear episode
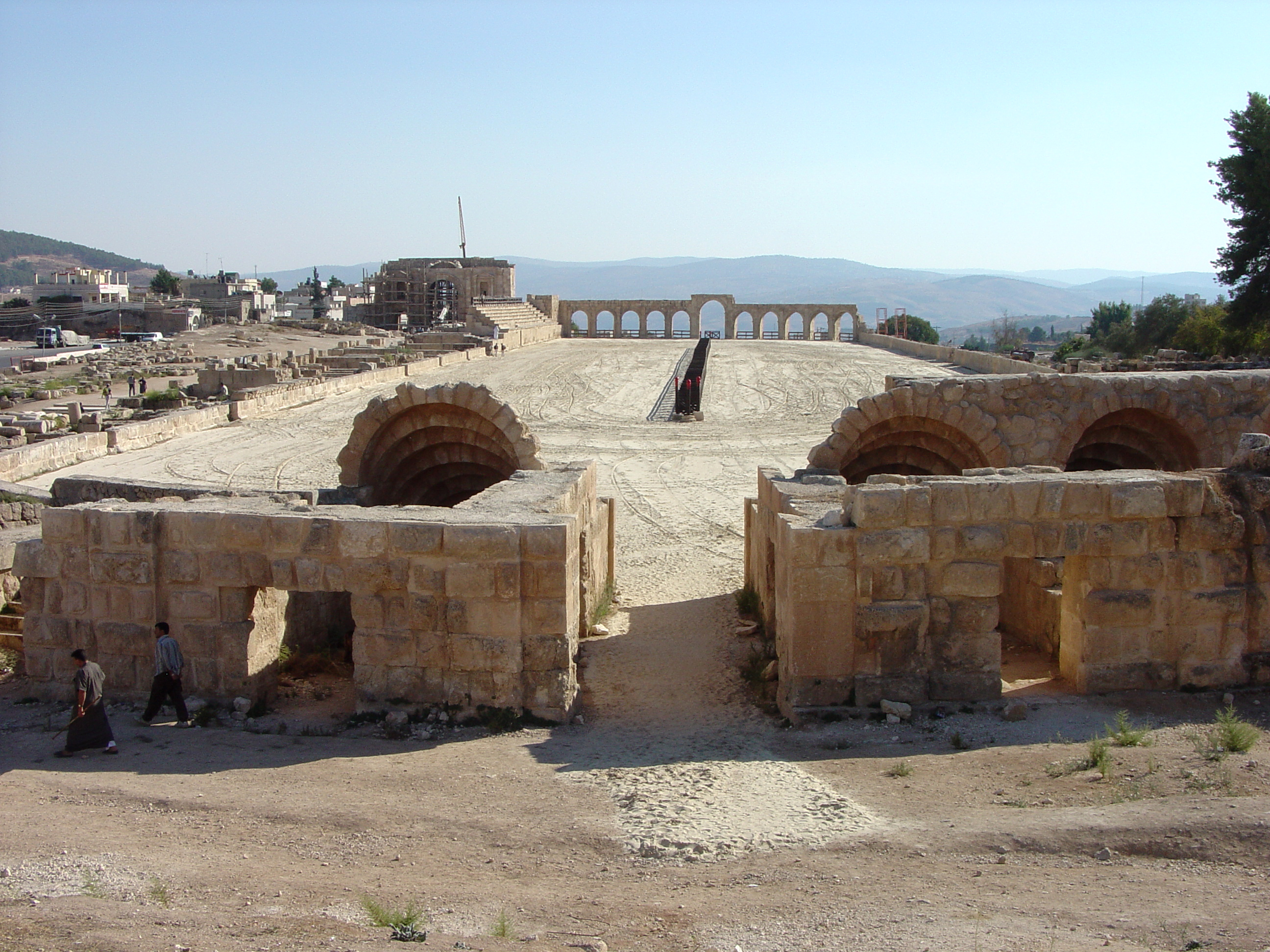
- Roman Hippodrome in Jerash used for NASCAR-style racing by the presenters
- Episode no.: Series 15; Episode 8
- Directed by: Phil Churchward
- Presented by: Jeremy Clarkson; Richard Hammond; James May; The Stig
- Production codes: Andy Wilman; Alexander Renton; Christopher Hale
- Original air date: 26 December 2010
- Running time: 76 minutes

Episode chronology
← Previous "East Coast Road Trip"	Next → "Series 16, Episode 1"
- Top Gear (series 16)

"Top Gear: Middle East Special" is a 76-minute-long extended episode of Top Gear series 16. The film predates the Syrian Civil War and involves a 1,200-mile (1,900 km) road-trip from Erbil International Airport in Iraqi Kurdistan to Bethlehem, nominally recreating the journey of the Three Wise Men. Their journey takes them across the Middle East via northern Iraq, southern Turkey, the Syrian Desert and the cities of Raqqa, Palmyra and Damascus in Syria, then Jerash in Jordan and finally the Mount of Olives. The journey includes visiting an abandoned theme park, and a stop at Ein Gev on the Sea of Galilee in Israel.

== Planning and filming ==
Planning for the episode began in January 2010, with the concept of the Baby Stig added later as a plot device to introduce a new Stig following the departure of Ben Collins. The Top Gear convoy included support vehicles for camera crews and the production team, plus a medic and a private security team. Filming took place during October 2010, with the convoy negotiating the Sheikh Hussein Bridge border crossing from Jordan to Israel on 19 October 2010. Subsequent filming took place in Nazareth with the crew departing via Highway 6. The Kurdistan UK Friendship Association, RUS Aviation (suppliers of the Ilyushin Il-76 cargo plane), and the Syrian Automobile club are thanked in the credits.

The cars purchased with a budget of £3,500 each have number plates from the country of Georgia. Clarkson is driving a Mazda MX-5, Hammond a Fiat Barchetta Riviera and May a BMW Z3. The team arrives sitting in their vehicles inside an Ilyushin Il-76, which opens the cargo door prior to landing and performs a go-around, before the starting location is revealed as Erbil, Iraq. Experiments were made on bulletproofing the car doors. The film crew encountered food poisoning, landmines, and border controls. Because it was a BBC production, the Top Gear film crew were prevented from crossing the Iran–Iraq border, thus having to drive through scenic northern Iraq and southern Turkey.

May was greeted by locals using his name in Iraq and his nickname, Captain Slow, in Syria. Whilst crossing Syria the presenters discovered they were extremely popular and well known, noticing a report about them being aired on a TV in a cafe they stopped in. This made them consider and go through with driving through hundreds of kilometres of the Syrian desert. During filming, presenter James May suffered a concussion having been knocked over by a tow rope, and was collected from hospital in Palmyra by Jeremy Clarkson and Richard Hammond who were wearing burqas as a disguise, having re-entered the road system, on the way to Damascus.

During the trip the cars were decorated in a Bedouin-style, with survival equipment, and one car with bull bars and a large hookah. Hammond's car was transformed to give the appearance of a nomadic tent; additionally, Clarkson and May pranked him by fitting his car with a car stereo that played songs by Genesis (a band Hammond doesn't like) non-stop. May's BMW was camouflaged using inspiration from the Afrika Corps, and Clarkson's Mazda received a Technicolour Dreamcoat-style paint scheme. Assuming they were unnoticed, they stopped in a Damascene hotel; only to be greeted with a banner saying "Welcome Top Gear".

During a NASCAR-style rally race at a Roman circus, the Gladiator soundtrack is played along with music from Ben-Hur. Clarkson narrates the words "Peace on Earth, and Goodwill to all men" from the Annunciation to the shepherds as the team are seen passing the West Bank barrier.

The episode ends with the presenters finding a miniature version of The Stig, complete with racing overalls and helmet. The presenters' gifts are a gold-relief medallion, a shampoo bottle called "Frankincense" and a Nintendo DSi XL in lieu of myrrh.

== Broadcast ==
Along with the Top Gear: East Coast Road Trip it was one of two specials produced in 2010. It was broadcast in the United Kingdom on 26 December 2010 and watched by 5.863 million viewers on BBC Two plus 546,000 viewers on BBC HD. The following-day repeat had a 7-day total of 2.988 million viewers on BBC Two, plus 202,000 on BBC HD. By the end of December 2010, it had been viewed 1.26 million times on the BBC iPlayer. It was scheduled for broadcast in Australia on 8 February 2011 on Channel Nine, and watched by 792,000 viewers. The adventure was included in the "Top Gear – The Great Adventures 1–4" DVD box set released in 2016.

After the screening of the episode the three main cars joined the World of Top Gear exhibition in the collection of the National Motor Museum, Beaulieu in England. The cars were exhibited again at the ExCeL London conference centre for Top Gear Live in November 2011. Unpainted HO scale and TT scale models were made available for 3D printing.

== Reception ==
At the time, The Daily Telegraph described it as "one of the best [Top Gear] specials yet." In 2015 the Swiss magazine Watson (de) included the Middle East Special on their top-eighteen best Top Gear moments describing it as the best Christmas Special of all time. In 2021, Clarkson described the Middle East Special as the best of the adventures to watch.

For the Middle East Special the BBC Trust's Editorial Standards Committee reviewed two rejected appeals in June 2011, two in July 2011 and one in October 2011, noting in all instances that they were "satisfied that the decision not to proceed with the appeal was correct."
