= Oops! I Bought A Pub =

Upcoming British reality television series

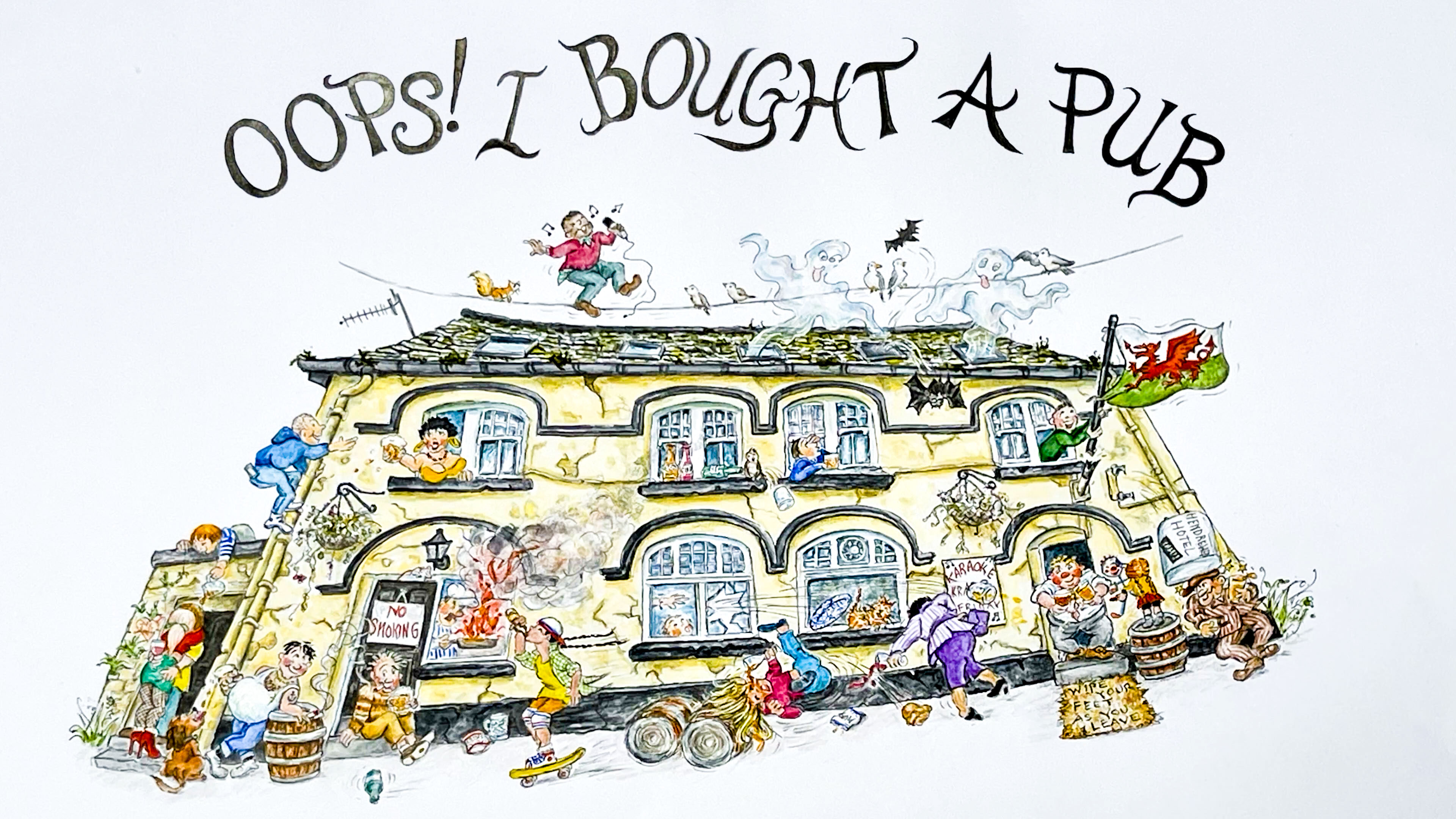
- Genre: Factual
- Presented by: Martin Roberts
- Country of origin: United Kingdom
- Original language: English
- No. of series: 1
- No. of episodes: 6

Production
- Running time: 60 minutes
- Production company: Homeward Films

Original release
- Network: YouTube

Oops! I Bought A Pub is an upcoming British reality television series featuring Martin Roberts, known for presenting the property auction series Homes Under the Hammer. The show follows his journey after impulsively purchasing The Hendrewen, a historic pub in the Rhondda Valley, Wales. It documents the challenges and triumphs he faces in renovating and managing the pub, aiming to restore it as a community hub.

An Australian version of the show premiered on the Seven Network on 2 May 2026.

== Premise ==
The series follows Martin Roberts as he embarks on an ambitious project to renovate and rejuvenate a historic pub and hotel, the Hendrewen Hotel, located in the small Welsh village of Blaencwm. Roberts, who has a deep affection for Wales, purchased the pub almost by accident but quickly saw its potential as a community hub and tourist destination.

The renovation of the Hendrewen Hotel is the focal point of the series. Throughout the show, viewers see the challenges and triumphs Roberts faces as he renovates the property. The project involves significant structural and aesthetic updates aimed at preserving the building's historical character while making it a functional and attractive venue for visitors and locals alike.

Each episode features different aspects of the renovation process, including the discovery of historical artifacts, interactions with local tradespeople, and Roberts' personal reflections on the importance of community and heritage preservation.

== Reception ==
The show has been well received for its heartfelt portrayal of Roberts' dedication to the project and the local community. Critics have praised the series for its educational value and its ability to highlight the beauty and cultural richness of the Welsh valleys.

== International versions ==
=== Australia ===
Oops! I Bought A Pub
- Starring: Shane Jacobson; Dean Murphy
- Country of origin: Australia
- Original language: English
- No. of seasons: 1
- No. of episodes: 6

Production
- Executive producers: Shane Jacobson; Dean Murphy
- Production location: Dederang
- Running time: 22 minutes
- Production company: Ocean View Entertainment

Original release
- Network: Seven Network
- Release: 2 May – 6 June 2026

An Australian version of the show starring comedian and actor Shane Jacobson premiered on the Seven Network on 2 May 2026. The Australian version sees Jacobson and friend Dean Murphy purchase and renovate the historic Dederang Hotel in rural Victoria.
