= Blair Joscelyne =

Australian composer

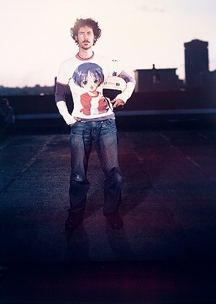
- Blair "Moog" Joscelyne
- Born: Blair Lyndon Joscelyne; 5 September 1978 (age 47); Grafton, New South Wales, Australia
- Other name: Moog
- Occupations: Composer, musician, producer, YouTube personality.
- Years active: 2008–present
- Parent: Chris Joscelyne (father)

Blair Lyndon Joscelyne (also known as Moog) is an Australian composer, musician, producer, and film maker. He is best known for composing music for television and film, and for being a co-creator of the YouTube series Mighty Car Mods.

== Career ==
After graduating from university he began working as a composer and audio engineer in the advertising industry. His music has been used in feature and short films as well as national and global advertising for companies for drinks companies such as Smirnoff, car companies (including BMW), and television and film companies including Discovery Channel, National Geographic Channel and Touchstone Pictures. He has released four albums – 1978 (Solo), "The Sea Brings Rivalry", Finding May as part of the duo Finding May and "Coming Up For Air" under the name 'Solar'. The self-titled album from Finding May achieved considerable commercial success with songs licensed for use in high-profile TV shows and advertisements. The song "Rain Hail or Shine" was used by Arnott's across all of their commercials in 2009 while the song "Join In" was used in a TV commercial for Origin Energy which won the MADC for "Best use of a song in advertising 2009".

"Finding May" also produced and performed the theme song for Jetstar in Australia.

In March 2014, MOOG composed, recorded and produced the soundtrack to the MightyCarMods movie "Kei to the City". This soundtrack album reached all-time eighth most downloaded album on iTunes in Australia, and became the number one most downloaded electronic album in Canada, and Australia.

In 2015 he composed, recorded and produced the music for the National Geographic Channel series "Tales by Light". His music for this series was described as capturing the essence of the images with pure beauty.

In October 2023, it was confirmed that he would be one of three hosts, alongside Beau Ryan and Jonathan LaPaglia, on a reboot of Top Gear Australia for Paramount Plus.

== Filmography ==
This is a list of films where Joscelyne has composed soundtracks.

Year	Film	Director	Role	Notes
2009	Girl Clock!	Jennifer Ussi	Composer	
2009	Lizard	John Skibinski	Composer	
2008	Mutt	Glen Hunwick	Composer	
2006	A Knight Lost	Tom Tate	Composer	
2006	Fishy	Dale Sydney	Composer	
2002	Man Conquers Space	David Sander	Composer	

== Discography ==
This is a list of albums/EPs/singles Joscelyne has composed under the name Moog.

Year	Album	TrackList
2010.09.05	The Sea Brings Rivalry	01. Neutral Territory; 02. Alive (feat. Js7); 03. Overdrive (feat. Js7); 04. Believe (feat. Js7); 05. Sew It Seams (feat. Erin Renee); 06. Everything Is Found (feat. Js7); 07. Overdriven (bilX1r Tokyo Drift Mix); 08. Believe (bilX1r Tokyo Drift Mix); 09. Overdrive (Habitat Remix); 10. Overdrive (Treeboi&Kone Remix)
2010.10.20	Ride [Single]	01. Ride
2010.12.22	Zombie Apocalypse Soundtrack [EP]	01. Zombie Apocalypse Theme; 02. The Spreading Infection; 03. Ploughing Through the Undead; 04. Last Human Contact; 05. Survival of the Deadest; 06. Dark Machine
2011.02.02	The Pursuit of Speed [Single]	01. The Pursuit of Speed
2011.03.01	Turbos and Temples [Soundtrack]	01. Turbos & Temples; 02. One Foot Forward; 03. 88; 04. A New Place; 05. High Speed Run; 06. Feel It All; 07. The Kings of Hokkaido; 08. On Air (feat. Erin Renee); 09. Lakeside (feat. Erin Clare); 10. Going Home (feat. Js7); 11. Ride [bonus track]; 12. The Pursuit of Speed [bonus track]
2011.09.27	Collide [Single]	01. Collide (feat. Erin Renee)
2011.12.06	Take Me Away [Single]	01. Take Me Away (feat. Erin Renee)
2012.02.20	Everything I Was [Single]	01. Everything I Was (feat. Mark Agustin & Erin Renee)
2012.07.03	Transformer [EP]	01. Transformer; 02. We Will Go Faster; 03. Little Symphony
2012.08.10	Jimmy Rabbit [Single]	01. Jimmy Rabbit (feat. Mammals)
2012.10.12	Collide (Whitecitylight Remix)[Single]	01. Collide (Whitecitylight Remix) [feat. Erin Renee]
2012.11.07	See You at the End [Single]	01. See You at the End
2012.12.05	Game On [Single]	01. Game On (feat. Jon Elms)
2013.02.22	Smoke and Fire [Single]	01. Smoke and Fire (feat. Erin Renee)
2013.04.25	Smoke and Fire (Whitecitylight Remix) [Single]	01. Smoke and Fire (Whitecitylight Remix) [feat. Erin Renee]
2013.06.19	A Place to Hide [Single]	01. A Place to Hide (feat. Js7)
2013.09.03	I Will Find You [Single]	01. I Will Find You (feat. Alphamama)
2013.10.08	Flee the City [Single]	01. Flee the City
2013.12.23	Everything Bang [Single]	01. Everything Bang
2014.02.25	Kei to the City	01. Kei to the City (feat. Simone Stockl); 02. Everything Bang; 03. I Will Find You (feat. Alphamama); 04. Amnesia (feat. Mark Agustin & Erin Renee); 05. Flee the City; 06. Drive (feat. Erin Renee); 07. Forced Induction (feat. Accalia Snow); 08. Highway Crimes (feat. Accalia Snow); 09. Remember (feat. Nat Joyce & Erin Renee)
2015.02.20	All in Your Mind [Single]	01. All in Your Mind
2015.02.20	I Feel You Now [Single]	01. I Feel You Now (feat. Julz)
2015.03.30	Chasing Midnight [EP]	01. Chasing Midnight (feat. Erin Renee); 02. All in Your Mind; 03. Giving up on Time (feat. Julz); 04. We Were Young (feat. Arc En Ciel); 05. Forever (feat. Katia Fuscaldo)
2015.08.24	I Won't Let You Go [Single]	01. I Won't Let You Go (feat. Js7)
2016.04.20	These City Lights [Single]	01. These City Lights (feat. Hannah Rae)
2016.12.16	Horizons [Single]	01. Horizons (feat. Erin Renee)
2017.02.01	Lift Me Up [Single]	01. Lift Me Up (feat. 7skies)
2017.06.05	Quarter Mile Dreams [EP]	01. Before We Run; 02. Neon Lights (feat. Katie Turner); 03. Rivals; 04. Parachute (feat. Glenn Cunningham)
2017.09.25	The First Ride [Single]	01. The First Ride
2017.11.10	Speed [Single]	01. Speed (feat. Mark Agustin)
2018.12.24	Take me back to Tokyo [Single]	01. Take me back to Tokyo (feat.Glenn Cunningham)
2019.07.03	One You Find [Single]	01. One You Find (feat. Jordan Millar)
2019.09.01	Bullet [Single]	01. Bullet (feat. Erin)
2020.05.12	Afraid To Lose [Single]	01. Afraid To Lose (feat.Katia Fuscaldo)
2020.05.14	Super Honk [Single]	01. Super Honk
2020.11.23	Night Vision [EP]	01. Player One; 02. Tunnel Run; 03. Cheat Code; 04. Final Boss; 05. Losing Purity
2022.05.04	Drowning in the Fire [Single]	01. Drowning in the Fire
2022.12.16	Back to You and Me [Single]	01. Back to You and Me (feat. Mark Agustin)
2022.12.16	Bullet (Japanese Version) [Single]	01. Bullet (Japanese Version) [feat. Erin Clare]
2022.12.16	Sneakers on the Ground [Single]	01. Sneakers on the Ground (feat. Erin Renee & Glenn Howard)
2023.07.03	Paris [Single]	01. Paris (feat. Nat James)
2023.12.15	From Ashes We Rise [Single]	01. From Ashes We Rise (feat. Mark Agustin)
2025.03.06	Iceberg [Single]	01. Iceberg
2025.05.01	It's Been a While [Single]	01. It's Been a While (feat. Mark Agustin)
2025.12.14	Kei to the City 2	01. Kei to the City 2 (feat. November); 02. City Turbo (feat. Glenn Cunningham); 03. Drag Me into the Light (feat. Mark Agustin & November); 04. Mountain Pass; 05. Super Tornado (feat. Katie Turner); 06. Evolution Nine; 07. Together on the Apex; 08. Ko Peanut; 09. Tricycle; 10. Honda (Take My Heart Away) (feat. November)
2026.05.27	Ninety Nein [Single]	01. Ninety Nein
