= Charlie Cox (racing driver) =

Australian racing driver and commentator (born 1958)

- Nationality: (Australia) Australian
- Born: Charles Richard Cox; 10 June 1958 (age 68) Gymea, Sydney, Australia

British Touring Car Championship
- Years active: 1995
- Teams: Thames Ford Dealers
- Starts: 12
- Wins: 0
- Poles: 0
- Fastest laps: 0
- Best finish: 23rd in 1995

Championship titles
- 1993, 1994 1993: National Saloon Car Cup - Class A BRDC National Sports GT Challenge - Class A

Charles Richard Cox (born 10 October 1964) is a Senior Media Executive, as well as a former broadcaster and racing driver.

Born and brought up in the suburb of Gymea in Sydney, New South Wales, Cox now lives with his family in the UK.

== Racing career ==
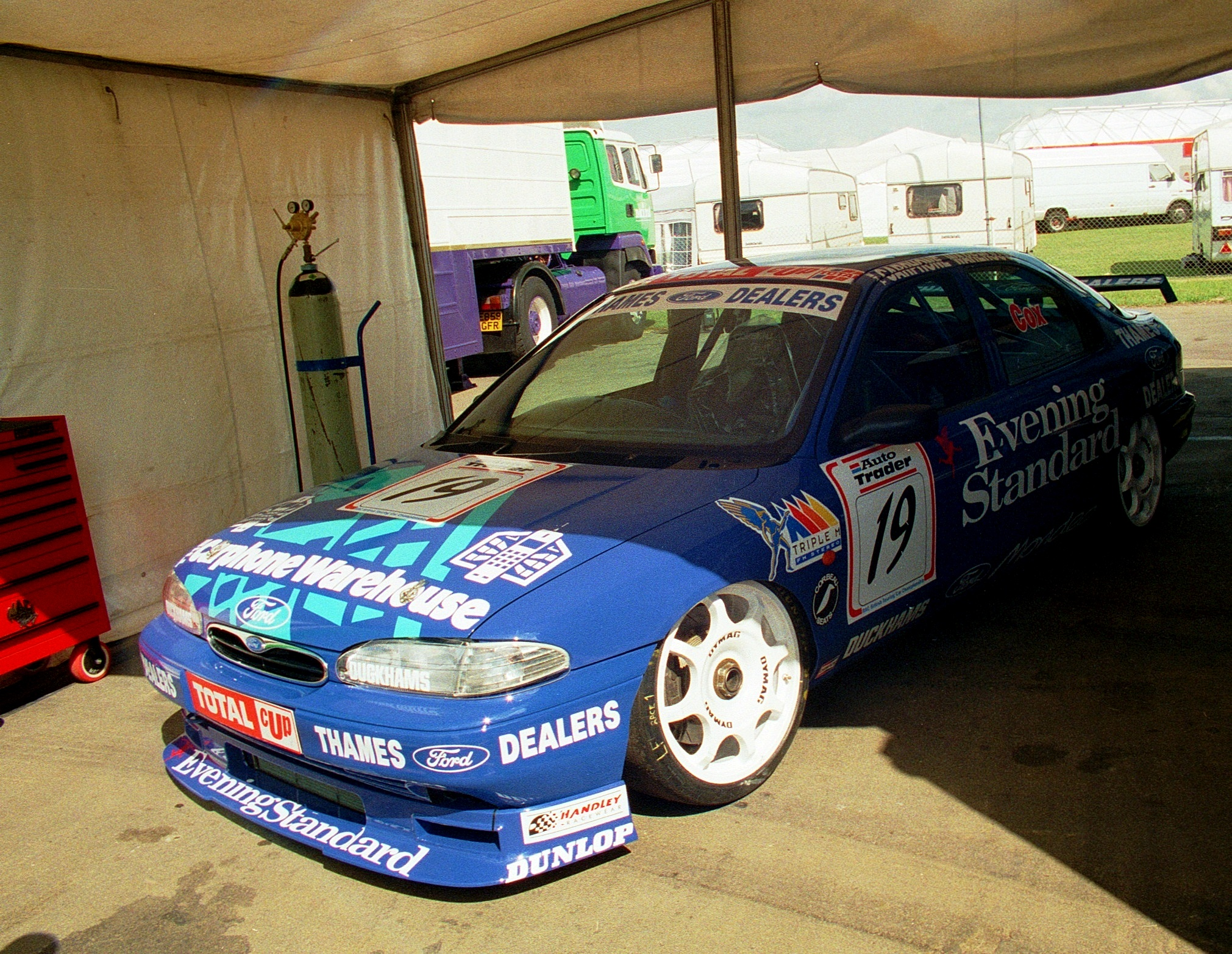
Charlie Cox's 1995 British Touring Car Championship Ford Mondeo.

Cox's earliest exposure to racing was in Australia in the late 1980s in the Production car-based "Street Sedans", raced on tracks in the Sydney area.

Cox raced a Ford Escort RS Cosworth in the 1993 National Saloon Car Cup in Britain, winning six races, including the Willhire 24 Hour at Snetterton, to clinch the Class A championship. Cox retained his title the following year, taking five wins during the season. He also claimed the Class A title in the 1993 BRDC National Sports GT Challenge.

For 1995, Cox moved up to the British Touring Car Championship in a Ford Mondeo for his recently formed Thames Ford Dealers team with sponsorship from the Evening Standard newspaper. He caused a sensation in a wet race early in the season by finishing fifth, although behind both works Fords, choosing the correct tyres and recovering from an early spin. However, a huge barrel-rolling crash at Thruxton left him with concussion, and caused him to miss several races. When he returned it was in a hatchback Mondeo, making him the first driver to race one in the BTCC.

Cox subsequently raced internationally in Sportscars as well as three appearances at the Bathurst 1000.driving the Vittoria Coffee Commodore.

From 1996 to 2001, Cox raced International Class GT sports cars in the UK, South Africa and across Europe. Notably, Cox raced a GT1 Factory Harrier in the 1997 British GT Championship.

== Racing record ==
=== Complete British Touring Car Championship results ===
(key) (Races in bold indicate pole position) (Races in italics indicate fastest lap)

Year	Team	Car	1	2	3	4	5	6	7	8	9	10	11	12	13	14	15	16	17	18	19	20	21	22	23	24	25	DC	Pts
1995	Thames Ford Dealers	Ford Mondeo Ghia	DON; 1; 18	DON; 2 Ret	BRH; 1; 5	BRH; 2; 15	THR; 1; 13	THR; 2 DNS	SIL; 1	SIL; 2	OUL; 1	OUL; 2	BRH; 1	BRH; 2	DON; 1	DON; 2	SIL	KNO; 1	KNO; 2	BRH; 1; 21	BRH; 2; 15	SNE; 1 Ret	SNE; 2; 16	OUL; 1 Ret	OUL; 2 DNS	SIL; 1 Ret	SIL; 2; 14	23rd	8

=== Complete V8 Supercar Championship results ===
Supercars results
Year	Team	Car	1	2	3	4	5	6	7	8	9	10	11	12	13	14	15	16	17	18	19	20	21	22	23	24	25	26	27	28	29	30	31	32	33	Position	Points
1999	Challenge Motorsport	Holden Commodore VS	EAS; R1	EAS; R2	EAS; R3	ADE; R4	BAR; R5	BAR; R6	BAR; R7	PHI; R8	PHI; R9	PHI; R10	HID; R11	HID; R12	HID; R13	SAN; R14	SAN; R15	SAN; R16	QLD; R17	QLD; R18	QLD; R19	CAL; R20	CAL; R21	CAL; R22	SYM; R23	SYM; R24	SYM; R25	WIN; R26	WIN; R27	WIN; R28	ORA; R29	ORA; R30	ORA; R31	QLD; R32	BAT; R33; Ret	NC	0

=== Complete Bathurst 1000 results ===
Year	Team	Car	Co-driver	Position	Laps
1997	Challenge Motorsport	Holden Commodore VS	(Australia) Chris Smerdon	17th	143
1998	Challenge Motorsport	Holden Commodore VS	(Australia) Chris Smerdon	DNF	60
1999	Challenge Motorsport	Holden Commodore VS	(Australia) Chris Smerdon	DNF	122

== Commentary career ==
Following a career racing cars, Cox moved into the commentary box in 1997, commentating on BTCC in 1997 alongside veteran commentator Murray Walker.

Following Walker's departure in 1998, Cox was lined-up alongside 1982 Formula One World Championship runner-up John Watson. The BBC's loss of BTCC coverage allowed Cox to move to motorbike coverage alongside Steve Parrish and Suzi Perry.

This move led to the BBC appointing Cox to commentate alongside Steve Parrish on MotoGP. Cox became known for his individual, comical and at times, tongue-in-cheek style, with catchphrases and one-liners expected as a staple serving for listeners.

An established and fondly remembered voice of motorsport, Cox frequently referred to co-commentator Steve Parrish as "Oracle".

== Top Gear Australia ==
Cox was named as one of the hosts for the first season of Top Gear Australia. Along with cartoonist Warren Brown and advanced driving instructor Steve Pizzati, Top Gear Australia premiered on SBS on 29 September 2008.

On the 19th December 2008, Cox announced his departure from Top Gear owing to a lack of time and opting to focus on his broadcasting career in the UK as BBC's MotoGP commentator until 2013.

== Media and business ==
As well as racing and sports, Cox has become well known within the media and publishing industry.

In 1990, Cox arrived in London to take over LBC radio, returning the company to a profitable state while launching new radio stations. Cox has also worked for Carphone Warehouse, which sponsored his BTCC entry in 1995. In 2000 he was appointed the head of mergers and acquisitions at the company, joining the board of directors in 2002 where he remained until 2008.

The former CEO of the UK's biggest circulation newspaper, The Metro, Cox has worked as an adviser to The Daily Mail Group since the 1990s, and is a director on the board for ITN.
