= Kenny (2006 film) =

- Theatrical film poster
- Directed by: Clayton Jacobson
- Written by: Clayton Jacobson; Shane Jacobson
- Produced by: Clayton Jacobson; Rohan Timlock
- Starring: Shane Jacobson; Eve von Bibra; Clayton Jacobson; Ronald Jacobson; Jesse Jacobson; Morihiko Hasebe; Vicki Musso
- Edited by: Clayton Jacobson; Sean Lander
- Music by: Richard Pleasance
- Production company: Thunderbox Films
- Distributed by: Madman Entertainment
- Release date: 17 August 2006
- Running time: 99 minutes
- Country: Australia
- Language: English

Kenny is a 2006 Australian mockumentary film starring Shane Jacobson as Kenny Smyth, a Melbourne plumber who works for a portable toilet rental company. The film was followed by the television series Kenny's World.

Director Clayton Jacobson describes the character of Kenny as "'The Dalai-Lama' of Waste Management, eternally optimistic and always ready to put others before himself. Kenny represents the humbling nature of common decency." The film was shot entirely on location in the western suburbs of Melbourne, Victoria, and Nashville, Tennessee, in the United States.

The film was released in the United Arab Emirates and the United Kingdom on 28 September 2007.

== Plot ==
Kenny is a mockumentary that follows the fictional Kenny through his daily life. His work and his personal relationships are explored as Kenny goes about his day-to-day activities and speaks directly to the camera and his audience. Kenny provides a most basic service to the community, portable toilets.

The audience sees Kenny interviewing potential clients and involvements in major public events. Kenny changes the level of service he provides based on the kind of food and drinks served at events. He regards himself as a professional, despite the disparagement of some and his family. Even at the most prestigious events for which he caters, Kenny realizes that the most glamorous will need his portable toilets.

He sees life in all of its complexities through the need of his services. Kenny takes his son, Jesse, to visit his father, but is hampered by his ex-wife's obstructiveness and his father's bitterness.

When Kenny travels to Nashville to attend a toilet convention, he is thrilled to travel outside his native Melbourne. His ingenuity, friendship and commitment to his profession opens business opportunities in Japan and the potential for a new relationship with Jackie, a flight attendant, but he must return home prematurely when his father suffers a medical emergency.

In an attempt at bonding, Kenny, his wealthy brother David, and their father go camping. After half a day, David leaves in disdain. After Kenny tries to defend David, his father tells Kenny to step out of his brother's shadow and stick up for himself, which prompts Kenny to consider his life. He reveals that his success in Nashville has led to the offer of a promotion, and though his father urges him to accept, Kenny is unsure.

When Kenny's ex-wife unexpectedly leaves him with Jesse on the day of the Melbourne Cup, his busiest day of the year, Kenny finds his son to be an able and cheerful assistant. However, prejudice against his work again appears, with customers complaining that a child should not be made to clean toilets, prompting Kenny to ask Jesse to stay in the office. When he returns to find Jesse gone, Kenny searches the venue in a panic and eventually finds him at the toilets, wanting to help again.

That night, as he is about to drive away in his septic tank truck after a long and exhausting day, Kenny's way is blocked by a luxury car whose driver insensitively brushes off his requests to move. Kenny breaks his longstanding habit of amiability to fill the man's car with human waste, a suggestion that perhaps Kenny has decided to stick up for himself a little bit more. Finally, Kenny declines the opportunity to become an executive and seeks out Jackie to renew their relationship.

== Cast ==
- Shane Jacobson as Kenny Smyth
- Eve von Bibra as Jackie Sheppard
- Clayton Jacobson as David Smyth
- Ronald Jacobson as Bill Smyth
- Jesse Jacobson as Jesse Smyth
- Morihiko Hasebe as Sushi Cowboy
- Vicki Musso as Kenny's ex-wife and Ringless Woman
- Glenn Preusker as Glenn
- Chris Davis as Pat
- Ian Dryden as Sammy
- Mark Robertson as Robbo
- Alf Scerri as Alf
- Jason Gann as Drunk Guy at Melbourne Cup
- Nash Edgerton as Golf Cart Victim
- Damian Walshe-Howling as Crazy Man in Toilet

== World premiere ==
In line with the theme of the film, its first screening was held in the Victorian country town of Poowong.

== Reception ==
Kenny received positive reviews. Rotten Tomatoes reports that all 25 reviews listed gave the film positive feedback, with an average review score of 7.60 out of 10. The site's consensus reads: "Kenny uses its seemingly lowbrow mockumentary premise as the foundation for a well-acted and surprisingly thoughtful character study". Jake Wilson in the Melbourne Age lauded the film as "the best Australian comedy in a very long time"; Megan Spencer of Triple J called Kenny "... a lot of fun and a good stab at a mock-doc ... a good-natured, crowd-pleasing comedy about ordinary life that outranks perennial 'ordinary Aussie bloke' yardstick, The Castle. She also praised the film's technical accomplishment, describing it as "a triumph, superbly shot, edited and directed by Clayton Jacobson – probably surpassing most Australian movies with its command of film language, shot on HD video to boot". Margaret Pomeranz from At the Movies awarded the film a score of 4.5 out of 5. In contrast, however, David Stratton gave the film 2.5 out of 5 stars, criticising the cinematography and overused humour.

=== Awards ===
Award	Category	Subject	Result
AACTA Award (2006 AFI Awards)	Best Film	Rohan Timlock	Nominated
AACTA Award (2006 AFI Awards)	Best Film	Clayton Jacobson	Nominated
AACTA Award (2006 AFI Awards)	Best Direction	Clayton Jacobson	Nominated
AACTA Award (2006 AFI Awards)	Best Original Screenplay	Clayton Jacobson	Nominated
AACTA Award (2006 AFI Awards)	Best Original Screenplay	Shane Jacobson	Nominated
AACTA Award (2006 AFI Awards)	Best Actor	Shane Jacobson	Won
AACTA Award (2006 AFI Awards)	Best Supporting Actor	Ronald Jacobson	Nominated
AACTA Award (2006 AFI Awards)	Best Editing	Clayton Jacobson	Nominated
AACTA Award (2006 AFI Awards)	Best Editing	Sean Lander	Nominated
FCCA Awards	Best Film	Rohan Timlock	Nominated
FCCA Awards	Best Film	Clayton Jacobson	Nominated
FCCA Awards	Best Director	Clayton Jacobson	Nominated
FCCA Awards	Best Original Screenplay	Clayton Jacobson	Won
FCCA Awards	Best Original Screenplay	Shane Jacobson	Won
FCCA Awards	Best Actor	Shane Jacobson	Won
Golden Trailer Awards	Best Foreign Comedy Trailer		Nominated
Inside Film Awards	Best Feature Film	Rohan Timlock	Won
Inside Film Awards	Best Feature Film	Clayton Jacobson	Won
Inside Film Awards	Best Director	Clayton Jacobson	Nominated
Inside Film Awards	Best Script	Clayton Jacobson	Nominated
Inside Film Awards	Best Script	Shane Jacobson	Nominated
Inside Film Awards	Best Editing	Clayton Jacobson	Nominated
Inside Film Awards	Best Editing	Sean Lander	Nominated
Inside Film Awards	Best Sound	Craig Carter	Won
Inside Film Awards	Best Sound	Peter D. Smith	Won

== Kenny's World ==
A television mockumentary series developed with Network Ten, Kenny's World, aired as part of Ten's second-half lineup of 2008. The series takes Kenny on a toilet tour of the globe. The show also features cameos of characters from the movie.

== Appearances in other media ==
Jacobson has reprised his performance as Kenny in Australian multiple TV shows, including 20 to 01 and The Panel Christmas Wrap 2006.

== Box office ==
Kenny grossed $7,778,177 at the box office in Australia.

== See also ==
- Cinema of Australia
