= Ewen Page =

Ewen Page was editor-in-chief of Top Gear Australia magazine and was the Top Gear official website. Page has a media career spanning 28 years and has edited a variety of Australian car magazines, from Street Machine to Wheels, Motor and Auto Action. He has a passion for all things with wheels. Ewen has also been the sports editor of The Canberra Times, editor of FHM, and was the founding deputy editor of Zoo Weekly.

In 2010 Page became a television presenter on the short lived television program Top Gear Australia alongside Steve Pizzati and Shane Jacobson.
