= Warren Brown (cartoonist) =

Australian cartoonist

Warren Brown AM
- Born: 1965 (age 60–61); Sydney, New South Wales, Australia
- Occupations: Cartoonist, author, television presenter

Warren Lindsay Brown AM (born 1965) is an Australian author, cartoonist and television presenter.

== Career ==
Brown has been an editorial newspaper cartoonist since 1986. He is currently cartoonist for the Sydney's Daily Telegraph, for which he also wrote a weekly motoring column and regularly contributes opinion and historical pieces.

He has won numerous awards for his cartooning including three times Australian Cartoonists' Association Editorial Cartoonist of the Year, Best Editorial Cartoonist News Awards and Rothmans Gold Medallist Editorial Cartoonist and Cartoon of the Year.

Brown also created editorial cartoons for the ABC television programs Difference of Opinion and Insiders, and presented the TV history programs National Treasures, The Prime Ministers' National Treasures, Rewind, Moments in Time, "Lost and Found" for the History Channel and hosted 'Design to Driveway' for Shannon’s Online.

In 1995, as part of the Federal Government's Australia Remembers commemorative program, he co-conceived and implemented Back to the Track, a pilgrimage for World War II veterans commemorating the building of the Stuart Highway between Alice Springs and Darwin, involving a troop train and a convoy of 100 WWII vehicles.

In May 2005, Brown co-devised and participated in a recreation of the 1907 Peking to Paris race using five 100-year-old cars to retrace the original 16,000 kilometres (9,900 mi) route from Beijing to Paris. He also presented a four-part documentary series about the event and co-wrote the accompanying book. The television series was a finalist for Best Documentary Series at the 2007 Logie Awards. He and co-driver Lang Kidby were awarded the Australian Geographic 'Spirit of Adventure' award.

In 2006 and 2007 Brown hosted The Weekender on ABC Network Local Radio, a national radio program broadcasting Saturday nights.

From 2006 to 2015 he acted as the overnight MC at Gallipoli on Anzac Day and the pre-service MC at the Australian War Cemetery at Lone Pine. In 2010 he was appointed to the National Commission for the Commemoration of the Anzac Centenary, a six-person panel tasked to prepare a report for the Prime Minister as to how Australians envisaged the commemoration of the centenary of the landings at Gallipoli in 2015, and a four-year commemorative program running from 2014 to 2018 marking all conflicts in which Australians have been involved. Other commission members, former Prime Ministers Malcolm Fraser and Bob Hawke, National President of the RSL Rear Admiral Ken Doolan, Major Matina Jewell and war-widow and veterans' advocate Kylie Russell. In 2012 he was appointed to the Anzac Centenary Task Force committees - 'Commemorative and Ceremonial', and 'Creative'.

He was appointed official host for The Sydney Invictus Games in 2018 and Master of Ceremonies for the 75th Anniversary of the end of the Second World War at the Australian War Memorial in 2020.

In 2008 he was selected to be one of the presenters of Top Gear Australia on SBS TV, and continued on in Season 2 (2009). He did not follow the program to Channel Nine for its 2010 revamp.

In 2012 he wrote a biography of Australian adventurer Francis Birtles for Hachette Australia. He followed this up by writing Lasseter’s Gold - an account of the ill-fated 1930 expedition to find the mysterious gold reef described by Harold Bell Lasseter.

Brown is a keen motoring enthusiast. He owns several vintage vehicles including a 1929 Dennis fire engine.

Brown was appointed as a Member of the Order of Australia (AM) in the 2023 Australia Day Honours for "significant service to media as a cartoonist, and to military history".

== Oral history ==
An oral history interview with Brown, recorded in 1998, is available at the National Library of Australia.
