= Top Gear Australia =

Australian TV series

- Genre: Reality television
- Presented by: Warren Brown; Charlie Cox; Steve Pizzati; The Stig; James Morrison; Shane Jacobson; Ewen Page; Blair Joscelyne; Beau Ryan; Jonathan LaPaglia
- Opening theme: "Jessica" by the Allman Brothers Band
- Composer: Dickey Betts
- Country of origin: Australia
- Original language: English
- No. of seasons: 5
- No. of episodes: 29 (list of episodes)

Production
- Production locations: Sydney, Australia
- Running time: 60 minutes (including commercials)
- Production companies: Freehand TV; BBC Studios Australia

Original release
- Network: SBS
- Release: 29 September 2008 – 29 June 2009
- Network: Nine Network
- Release: 28 October 2010 – 28 April 2012
- Network: Paramount+
- Release: 17 May 2024 – present
- Network: Network 10
- Release: 17 October 2024 – present

Related
- Top Gear worldwide

Top Gear Australia is an Australian motoring reality television series, based on the British BBC series Top Gear. The programme first premiered on SBS One on 29 September 2008. A second season was ordered following the high ratings for the premiere episode and positive comments from advertisers, and the second season began broadcasting from 11 May 2009. After acquiring the rights to broadcast the UK version in 2009, the Nine Network started airing their own version of Top Gear Australia in September 2010. Top Gear Australia returned for a fourth season in 2011. The show was cancelled on 28 April 2012 due to declining ratings. An eight-part season returned in 2024 on Paramount+ with new hosts.

Top Gear Australia is also the name of a licensed version of the British Top Gear magazine. The Australian magazine is produced by ACP Magazines (Australian Consolidated Press). The magazine features articles from many writers including Steven Corby, Craig Jamieson, Bill Mckinnon, James Stanford, Ben Smithurst, Jason Barlow, Sam Phillip, Ollie Marriage, Dan Read and Paul Horrell.

In October 2023, it was announced that the series would be revived by BBC Studios Australia with hosts Blair "Moog" Joscelyne, Beau Ryan and Jonathan LaPaglia, as an eight-part fifth season which premiered on 17 May 2024 on Paramount+. It premiered on free-to-air television on Network 10 and 10Play on 17 October 2024.

== Presenters ==
Prior to filming SBS made an open casting call for presenters, resulting in over 4000 applications. The original hosts chosen for Top Gear Australia were cartoonist and motoring columnist Warren Brown, MotoGP commentator Charlie Cox, and race driver / driving instructor Steve Pizzati.

Marketing prior to the first episode stated that the presenters would be joined by The Stig's "Australian cousin", but in the first episode the driver was introduced as just "The Stig". Steve Pizzati suggested that The Stig have an "Australian" name, such as "Stiggo", but the other presenters refused. The season 2 opener clarified that Top Gear Australia's Stig is not intended to be the same Stig from the UK series.

On 19 December 2008, Charlie Cox announced he was leaving the program as he felt he was unable to offer enough time to the show. SBS subsequently announced that trumpeter James Morrison would be his replacement, joining Warren and Steve for season two. Morrison had previously appeared as a guest in the sixth episode.

For the third season, early reports claimed that former Australian cricketer Shane Warne would take over the hosting of the show alongside original Top Gear host Jeremy Clarkson, although the BBC ultimately ruled out Clarkson's involvement in the Australian version. On 20 June 2010, it was announced that actor and comedian Shane Jacobson and Top Gear Australia magazine editor Ewen Page would join a returning Steve Pizzati to present the show for the Nine Network, which premièred on 28 September 2010 with a 75-minute The Ashes special, in which the hosts faced off against their Top Gear UK counterparts in a series of motoring-related challenges. The UK presenters won after cheating in the final challenge by using a professional race driver instead of James May.

In October 2023 it was announced that Blair "Moog" Joscelyne, Beau Ryan and Jonathan LaPaglia would be hosts for the fifth season of Top Gear Australia, which premiered on 17 May 2024 on Paramount+.

== Production ==
Mirroring the UK series, the studio segments were recorded at Bankstown Airport in Sydney. An exact copy of the UK studio at Dunsfold Park was constructed in a hangar (Hangar Building 581). The power laps and "Star in a Bog Standard Car" were recorded at Camden Airport with parts of the runways and taxiways used as a test track.

Top Gear Australia uses the same theme music as the UK series, a version of The Allman Brothers Band's "Jessica".

== Episodes ==
Series	Episodes	Originally released			Average viewers (in millions)
Series	Episodes	First released	Last released	Network	Average viewers (in millions)
1	8	29 September 2008	17 November 2008	SBS	0.64
2	8	11 May 2009	29 June 2009	SBS	0.57
3	4	28 September 2010	2 November 2010	Nine Network	1.08
4	6	30 August 2011	28 April 2012	Nine Network	—N/a
5	8	17 May 2024	28 June 2024	Paramount+	—N/a

== Segments ==
Top Gear Australia season 1 presenters from L to R: Warren Brown, Steve Pizzati, Charlie Cox.

Season 2 presenter James Morrison and The Stig.

Top Gear Australia features segments that mirror those seen on the BBC series, including build challenges and test drives. A significant difference is that all specifications are in metric units and prices are quoted in Australian dollars.

=== Power Lap ===
A test track around Camden Airport is used for power laps. The initial track used in the first two seasons consisted of nine corners running in an anti-clockwise direction. The first corner was The Question Mark followed by Clarkson Corner then The Crest and Turn 4 which was followed by the Main Straight before coming to a series of Chicanes then 06 Corner (named after the direction of the runway) then the Short Left Hander and the Bus Stop Entry and Exit followed by the finish line.

At the start of Season 3, Top Gear Australia revealed a new test track. Still situated at Camden Airport, the new course built upon the old one by adding a new section, thus looping into a figure of eight. It contains twelve corners, a total length of 2.3 km and moves the Start/Finish line from between the Bus Stop and The Question Mark to the end of the Back Straight, ahead of the Bus Stop. The direction of the course is now clockwise, turning the main runway into the first straight. The first corner leads into a Hammerhead-like corner called The Blowout, followed by another straight which crest a small hill into a couple of Left Handers, turns 3 and 4. Exiting turn 4 leads back to the main runway and turn 5, Brocky's Corner. The track then crosses over The Blowout into a right then left hander called The Flipper. The next turn is the Question Mark hairpin from the old track. Finally, after a short straight, the course reaches the signature Bus Stop which is then followed by two right hand corners (including the old 06 Corner) back into the Start/Finish.

==== Lap times ====
1. 1:06.92 – Porsche 997 GT2
2. 1:07.06 – Nissan GT-R
3. 1:07.69 – Lamborghini Murcielago LP640
4. 1:08.80 – Ford GT RHD001 (850 hp)
5. 1:08:88 – Lotus 2-Eleven
6. 1:09.46 – Nissan GT-R (180 km/h speed limited)*
7. 1:10.44 – Mercedes-Benz CLK 63 AMG Black Series
8. 1:10:97 – Elfin T5
9. 1:11:18 – Audi RS6 Avant
10. 1:11.69 – Porsche 997 Carrera S PDK
11. 1:11.82 – Maserati GranTurismo S
12. 1:11.87 – Audi R8 (wet track)
13. 1:12.00 – Walkinshaw Performance HSV Clubsport (with 20" wheels)
14. 1:12.28 – Lotus Elise
15. 1:12.56 – HSV W427
16. 1:12:88 – Elfin MS8 Streamliner
17. 1:13.40 – BMW M3
18. 1:13.53 – HSV Clubsport R8 (6.2L) wagon
19. 1:13.60 – HSV Clubsport R8 (6.2L)
20. 1:13.63 – Nissan 370Z
21. 1:13.72 – Mercedes-Benz CLS 63 AMG
22. 1:14.08 – Mercedes-Benz SL 63 AMG
23. 1:14.22 – Jaguar XF SV8 4.2 S/C
24. 1:14.28 – Mitsubishi Lancer Evolution X
25. 1:14.90 – BMW 135i Coupé
26. 1:15.19 – Walkinshaw Performance HSV Clubsport (with 22" wheels)
27. 1:15.31 – BMW X6 xDrive50i
28. 1:20.41 – Ford FG Falcon XT
29. 1:22.06 – Holden VE Commodore Omega
30. 1:22.53 – Ford Falcon GTHO Phase III**
31. 1:28.41 – Porsche Cayenne Turbo
32. 1:44.66 – Hummer H2 Stretch Limousine
33. 2:31.46 – Ford Model T***

* The Nissan GT-R was listed as 180 km/h speed limited for its run in Episode 1 of Season 1, it was subsequently run without the limiter in Episode 7 of Season 2.
** Pizzati placed it at the top of the board despite being in the bottom three.
*** In keeping with the theme of the car, the Ford Model T's Power Lap was presented in a black-and-white silent film format.

New Track Lap Times

1. 1:18.98 – FPR Ford Falcon V8 Supercar
2. 1:21.72 – Nissan GT-R (2012 facelift)
3. 1:24.00 – Lamborghini Gallardo LP 550-2
4. 1:25.20 – Audi R8 V10 Spyder
5. 1:26.12 – Chevrolet Corvette C6 ZR1
6. 1:28.41 – Porsche Cayenne Turbo
7. 1:29.09 – Audi S4
8. 1:29.53 – BMW X5 M
9. 1:30.29 – Holden Dealer Team Blue Meanie
10. 1:32.40 – Volvo S60R T6
11. 1:33.52 – FPV Ford Falcon GT 335
12. 1:35.90 – Renault Clio RS

=== Star in a Bog Standard Car ===
The Star in a Reasonably Priced Car segment is mirrored with the name "Star in a Bog Standard Car". It is identical in execution. The car used in the first two seasons on SBS was a Proton Satria Neo, the third season on Nine used a 2nd hand Ford XG Falcon ute, manufactured in 1995.

==== Lap times ====
===== Season 1 and 2: Proton Satria Neo =====
1. 1:26.31 – Gyton Grantley
2. 1:26.46 – James Morrison*
3. 1:26.69 – Brendan Jones
4. 1:26.75 – Steve Bisley
5. 1:27.13 – Ian Moss
6. 1:27.44 – Shannon Noll (wet track)
7. 1:27:63 – Gary Sweet
8. 1:28:69 – Leisel Jones
9. 1:31.10 – Jack Thompson
10. 1:31.22 – Claudia Karvan
11. 1:31.75 – Amanda Keller (first time driving a manual car)
12. 1:34.19 – Vince Colosimo
13. 1:37.10 – Anh Do (first time driving a manual car)
14. 1:37.41 – Julia Zemiro (first time driving a manual car)
15. 1:38.56 – H.G. Nelson

* Morrison was removed from the board after he became a host.

====== Race drivers ======
1. 1:22.47 – Mark Skaife
2. 1:23.53 – James Courtney
3. 1:23.60 – Greg Murphy

===== Season 3 and 4: Ford Falcon Ute =====
1. 1:46.06 Glen Boss
2. 1:46.34 Jamie Durie
3. 1:48.22 Shane Crawford
4. 1:48.50 Andy Lee
5. 1:49.69 Hamish Blake
6. 1:51.46 Craig Reucassel
7. 1.51.47 Michael Clarke
8. 1:53.72 Jimmy Barnes
9. 1.55.86 Natalie Gruzlewski
10. 1.56.00 Wendell Sailor
11. 2.00.41 Lisa McCune
12. 2:27.50 Andrew Hansen

=== What Were They Thinking? ===
In the first season, the presenters discuss "stupid" ideas in motoring history and put pictures of them on a board. The board was later destroyed in the first episode of the second season when the shark cage Mini Moke was dropped on top of it.

- Episode 1: Maybach 57S, Mitsubishi Legnum, Lightburn Zeta
- Episode 2: Leyland Force 7, Rinspeed sQuba, Valiant Charger E38
- Episode 3: Volvo 262 Coupé, Holden VC Commodore Starfire, Brown and Pizzati converting a Smart into a hearse
- Episode 4: Armstrong Siddeley ute, Ferrari 456 GT Venice
- Episode 5: Renault Vel Satis, SsangYong Stavic, Ford Festiva
- Episode 6: Parking police, Lotus Elan Series 2
- Episode 7: Wheels magazine's selections for Car of the Year: Renault 12, Mitsubishi Nimbus, withholding the award on three occasions, Holden Camira and a split decision in 1991 between the Honda NSX and the Nissan Pulsar
- Episode 8: The people of Babylon for the invention of toll roads. Jeremy Clarkson, James May and Richard Hammond because "they let three turkeys on the other side of the planet make a version of their show" Top Gear as quoted by Steve Pizzati in the programme.

=== Old car commercials ===
Every episode in the second season of Top Gear Australia, an old car commercial was shown.

- Episode 1: Holden, "Football, Meat pies, Kangaroos and Holden cars"
- Episode 2: Chrysler Charger, "Hey Charger!"
- Episode 3: Chrysler Sigma, "It's a sensation" also known as "New from Japan"
- Episode 4: Holden, "New Turbo-Smooth"
- Episode 5: Ford Escort, "It's a little gas!"
- Episode 6: Ford, "It's the going thing"
- Episode 7: Holden, "New Torana"
- Episode 8: Ford, "1, 2, 3, 4, 5, Cortina" (6 Cylinder)

=== Stunts ===
Imitating its BBC counterpart, the show includes features where the hosts undertake various stunts some of which may antagonise members of the public. In October 2008 it was reported that Pizzati and Brown caused a traffic jam in Toorak, Victoria when they drove a tractor through the Melbourne suburb – a reference to the colloquial expression "Toorak Tractor", Australian slang for luxury SUVs. The stunt featured in episode 5 of season 1, which aired on 27 October 2008.

=== V8 to the Rescue ===
In season three, a new segment called V8 to the Rescue, was introduced. It saw the presenters attempt to solve the world's problems by fitting a V8 engine to an everyday item, including a see-saw and cricket bowler. The segment appeared in every episode of the fourth season at the end of the episode.

- Season 3, Episode 1: Life-saving device
- Season 4, Episode 1: Cricket bowling machine
- Season 4, Episode 2: Kebab cooker
- Season 4, Episode 3: See-saw

== Reception ==
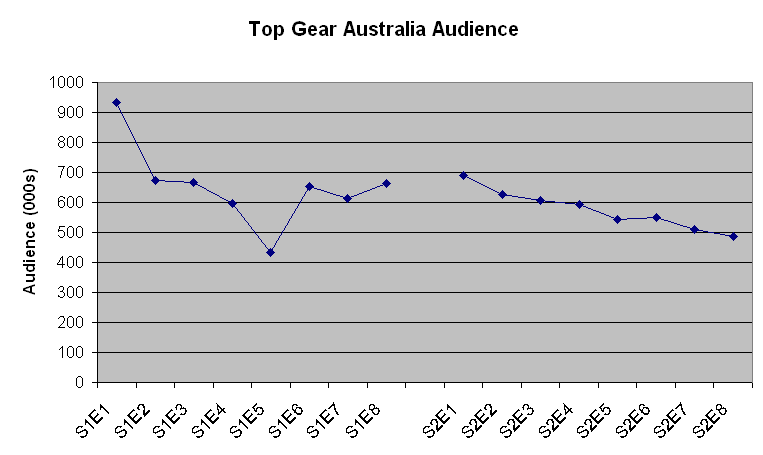
TV ratings for Top Gear Australia in the Monday 7.30 pm timeslot

Michael Idato of The Sydney Morning Herald described the first episode as "unsteady on some of the corners" and "a little too tricked up for its own good", noting "a distinct lack of detail, presumably to position the show away from car geeks". Stuart Martin, motoring writer for The Advertiser in Adelaide said a franchise was "always going to have a tough job living up to the UK original" but noted that Top Gear was not an overnight success and urged viewers to "give the locals a chance to find their niche". In retrospect Philip King said that the first season "received lukewarm reviews and couldn't get close to the ratings success of the original".

The first episode debuted with an audience of 933,000 viewers, SBS's highest ever ratings for a locally produced television programme. Top Gear Australia came third in its time slot and beat an elimination episode of Australian Idol. The figure was slightly higher than any season premiere of the BBC version aired on SBS, up until that date. However, subsequent episodes failed to match this figure, and the first season averaged around 650,000 viewers an episode. In comparison, viewing figures for the previous three Top Gear UK episodes shown in the same timeslot averaged around 903,000 viewers, though during this period Top Gear Australia still remained the highest rating program on SBS. Season one has since been repeated on SBS Two.

For the second season SBS attempted to address some of the criticism brought up against the first season. The second season of the show debuted with 689,000 viewers, averaging 576,500 viewers across the series against the high rating MasterChef Australia. Ratings dropped throughout the second season, leading to speculation that SBS would not buy a third season.

Jeremy Clarkson has commented on the Australian version, saying "We're loving it, even though your funny accents make you hard to understand".

The third season premiered on 28 September 2010 on the Nine Network, pulling in 1,538,000 viewers, making it the second most watched television program that day. The 75-minute The Ashes special, which featured the Top Gear UK presenters facing against the Australian presenters in a season of challenges, also won its timeslot against competing programs.

The Nine Network renewed the series for a fourth season in 2011 before being cancelled after three of the six recorded episodes aired due to declining ratings. The remaining unaired episodes were eventually burnt-off on Nine's subchannel Go! in April 2012.

== Magazine ==
An Australian version of Top Gear magazine titled Top Gear Australia (published by Park Publishing, a partnership between ACP Magazines and the BBC) was launched in June 2008 and features an amalgam of original Australian articles together with licensed content from the British and other international versions of the magazine.

== DVD release ==
The third season of Top Gear Australia was released on 3 March 2011, and contained the first three episodes from the season, as well as The Ashes Special. Season four was released on 1 March 2012, and also contained episode four from the third season.

== Unaired episodes ==
The Nine Network had not shown the final episode of the third season, or the final three episodes from the fourth. The remaining episodes from season four began to be shown in April 2012 on Go!. The episode from season three was going to be included in the first DVD release, but was removed at the last minute. Images from this episode appear on the case and discs, and the episode is included in the running time. All of the unaired episodes were included in the second DVD release.

== International broadcast ==
Every episode of Top Gear Australia has been broadcast in New Zealand on Prime, excluding the final season. It does not broadcast on BBC knowledge (like Top Gear UK)
