= Shane Jacobson =

Australian actor, entertainer, director, writer, and producer

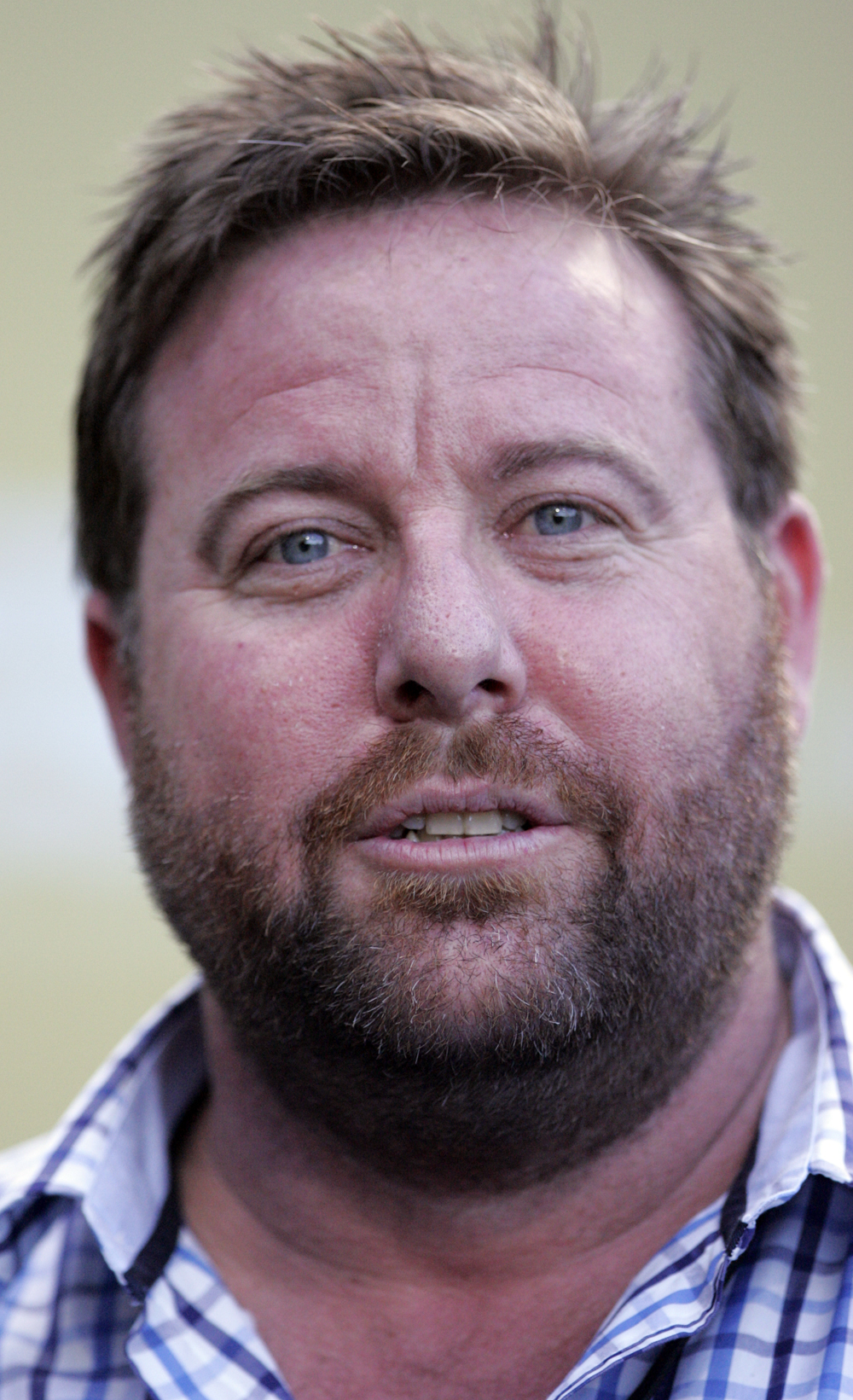
- Jacobson in 2013
- Born: 18 March 1970 (age 56); Essendon, Victoria, Australia
- Occupations: Actor; entertainer; director; writer; producer; chief scout of Victoria
- Years active: 1999–present
- Height: 185 cm (6 ft 1 in)
- Spouse: Felicity Hunter (m. 2018)
- Children: 4
- Relatives: Clayton Jacobson (brother)
- Website: www.shanejacobson.com.au

Shane Jacobson is an Australian actor, entertainer, director, writer, and producer, best known as the "Dunny Man" for his performances as the eponymous character Kenny Smyth. In 2006, he won the Australian Film Institute's Award for Best Actor in a Leading Role for that performance. In 2017 and 2018 he presented Little Big Shots, on the Seven Network, based on the American series of the same title. In 2019, Jacobson became a judge on Australia's Got Talent.

== Career ==
Jacobson began his career on the stage at the age of 10, with amateur theatre and the Melbourne Gang Show. At 18, he began his comedy career with theatre restaurant, musical theatre, stand-up and MC gigs. He was also hired to play to corporate functions, impersonating business icons and luminaries.

In 1999, Jacobson received a regular segment on Melbourne's Gold FM radio station, called The 60 Minute Challenge. He also created the character voice of Sergio the Hairdresser, who featured regularly on Gold FM's Breakfast Show. Jacobson's focus eventually moved towards the camera, and he began acting in music videos, short films and television commercials whilst continuing to perform audience warm-ups for major TV networks. Around this time, he had a comedic role in the indie sci-fi film Narcosys alongside future National Workers Alliance founder Matt Trihey.

In 2006, Jacobson starred in the Australian mockumentary film Kenny as Kenny Smyth, a Melbourne plumber who works for plumbing company Splashdown. The film was a critical and financial success, and is considered to be Jacobson's break-out role. In 2008, he reprised the role for the TV series Kenny's World.

In 2007, Jacobson was cast in two Australian feature films: Cactus, directed by Jasmine Yuen-Carrucan and released in cinemas in May, and Newcastle, directed by Dan Castle and released later in 2008.

In April 2008, he began his role of Nicely-Nicely Johnson in the major stage production Guys and Dolls. For this role, he won a 2008 Helpmann Award for "Best Supporting Actor in a Musical".

On 24 April 2009, Jacobson guest co-hosted Australian television program The Morning Show with Kylie Gillies, while the program's regular co-host Larry Emdur was on holidays.

In 2009, Jacobson co-starred with Paul Hogan in Charlie & Boots, an Australian film in which Boots (Jacobson) takes his father, Charlie (Hogan), on a road trip to fish on the northernmost tip of Australia. It had the best opening weekend for any Australian film in 2009 when it was released on Father's Day. The film was shot on location and features many small towns in rural Australia.

Jacobson was co-host of the short lived car show Top Gear Australia with Steve Pizzati and Ewen Page. It ran for two seasons on Nine Network, from 28 September 2010, to 13 September 2011.

In June 2011, the Herald Sun revealed that Jacobson would be starring in the TV miniseries Beaconsfield, the story of the Beaconsfield Mine collapse, playing the role of Brant Webb. It aired on Sunday 22 April 2012.

In 2013, Jacobson co-hosted the first season of The Great Australian Bake Off, an Australian reality television baking competition. Jacobson also starred as Luce Tivolli in the 2013 ABC drama The Time of Our Lives, which ran for two seasons (2013-2014).

In 2018, Jacobson joined the voice cast of Thomas & Friends, voicing an Australian steam engine called Shane. In mid-2018, Jacobson hosted Little Big Shots Australia for Channel 7.

In 2019, Jacobson became a judge on Australia's Got Talent alongside Lucy Durack, Nicole Scherzinger and Manu Feildel. In June 2022, Jacobson was announced to be returning as a judge on Australia's Got Talent, alongside new judges Kate Ritchie, Alesha Dixon and David Walliams.

In 2020, Jacobson starred in the Australian comedy-drama film Never Too Late which had been filmed in Adelaide, South Australia the previous year.

In 2021, Jacobson was the narrator for the SBS documentary Inside Central Station. In 2022, he produced and performed in a celebrity tribute to Australian comedian and actor Paul Hogan, Roast of Paul Hogan, which was broadcast on Australia’s Seven Network.

In 2025, Jacobson became a co-owner of a regional Victorian hotel in Dederang, which was reported to be the subject of a planned reality television series documenting the purchase and refurbishment of the venue. The series, Oops! I Bought A Pub, premiered on the Seven Network on 2 May 2026.

Jacobson was announced as a contestant on series 6 of Taskmaster Australia in July 2026.

== Scouting ==
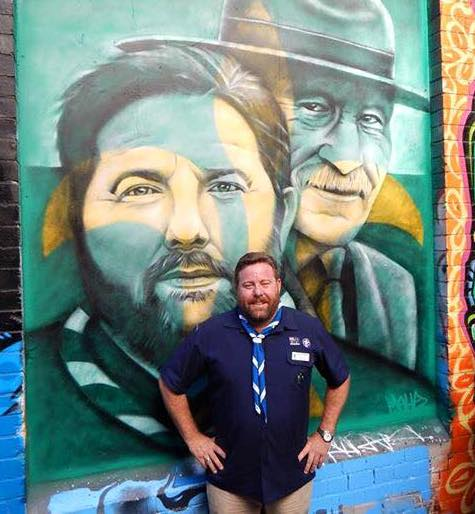
Shane Jacobson, Chief Scout of Victoria, with street art depicting himself and Scout Association founder Lord Baden-Powell

During his youth, Jacobson was a Scout with 1st Keilor, 15th Essendon and Snowy Morcom Rover Crew. Jacobson credits Scouting shows, including Melbourne Gang Show and Bayside Showtime as first piquing his interest in the performing arts.

After two decades, Jacobson returned to Scouting in 2015, in a ceremonial position, as Scouts Victoria's Chief Scout. The position of Chief Scout of Victoria had been held previously by Governors of Victoria. The position was offered to Jacobson as a high-profile former Scout to promote Scouting to wider audiences.

== Filmography ==
=== Film ===
| Year | Title | Role | Notes |
|---|---|---|---|
| 2006 | Kenny | Kenny Smyth | Feature film Australian Film Institute Award for Best Actor in a Leading Role |
| 2008 | Cactus | Thommo | Feature film |
| 2008 | Newcastle | Reggie | Feature film |
| 2009 | Charlie & Boots | Boots | Feature film |
| 2010 | Santa's Apprentice | Santa Claus (voice) | Animated film |
| 2011 | Surviving Georgia | Johnnie | |
| 2012 | The Bourne Legacy | Factory manager | Feature film |
| 2012 | Beaconsfield | Brant Webb | TV film |
| 2012 | The Mystery of a Hansom Cab | Detective Samuel Gorby | TV film |
| 2012 | Jack Irish: Bad Debts | Barry Tregear | TV film |
| 2012 | Jack Irish: Black Tide | Barry Tregear | TV film |
| 2014 | Jack Irish: Dead Point | Barry Tregear | TV film |
| 2014 | The Apprentice | Bob | Short film (deleted Movie 43 segment) |
| 2015 | Oddball | Swampy | Feature film |
| 2015 | The Dressmaker | Alvin Pratt | Feature film |
| 2018 | The BBQ | Dazza | Feature film |
| 2018 | Guardians of the Tomb | Gary | Feature film |
| 2018 | Brothers' Nest | Terry | Feature film |
| 2018 | That's Not My Dog! | Himself | Feature film |
| 2018 | Ladies in Black | Mr Miles | Feature film |
| 2020 | Never Too Late | Bruce Wendell | Feature film |
| 2021 | Inside Central Station | Narrator | |

=== Television ===
| Year | Program | Role | Notes |
|---|---|---|---|
| 2008 | Kenny's World | Kenny Smyth | TV series |
| 2010–11 | Top Gear Australia | Himself | TV series, co-host |
| 2013–14 | The Time of Our Lives | Luce Tivolli | TV series, 21 episodes |
| 2013 | It's a Date | Hugo | TV series, episode: "Should You Date on the Rebound?" |
| 2014 | Fat Tony & Co. | Detective Inspector Jim 'Big Kahuna' O'Brien | TV miniseries, 9 episodes |
| 2014 | ManSpace | Co-host | TV series |
| 2015 | Open Slather | Various roles | TV series |
| 2016–21 | Jack Irish | Barry Tregear | TV series |
| 2016 | Who Do You Think You Are? | Himself (featured) | TV series |
| 2017–18 | Little Big Shots | Host | TV series |
| 2018–20 | Thomas & Friends | Shane (UK/US voice) | TV series |
| 2019–present | Australia's Got Talent | Judge | TV series |
| 2026 | Oops! I Bought A Pub | Himself | TV series, 6 episodes |

=== Theatre ===
| Year | Title | Role | Notes |
|---|---|---|---|
| 2008 | Guys and Dolls | Nicely-Nicely Johnson | |
| 2014 | Mother and Son | Robert Beare | Adaptation of the TV show |
| 2018 | The Rocky Horror Show | Narrator | |
| 2022 | Hairspray | Edna Turnblad | |
| 2024 | The Odd Couple | Oscar Madison | |

== Bibliography ==
- Jacobson, Shane (1 August 2013). The Long Road to Overnight Success. ABC Books. ISBN 9780730499985.
- Jacobson, Shane (24 July 2017). Rev Head. ABC Books. ISBN 9780733338168.

== Awards ==
- 2006 Australian Film Institute award for Best Actor in a Leading Role for Kenny
- 2006 Film Critics Circle of Australia awards for Best Actor in a Lead Role and Best Screenplay for Kenny
- 2006 Inside Film Award for both Best Feature Film and Best Script (shared with Clayton Jacobson)
- 2007 Film Ink Magazine Awards for Best Newcomer
- 2007 Australian Star of the Year Award at the Australian International Movie Convention.
- 2008 Helpmann Award for Best Supporting Actor in a Musical, for his role as Nicely-Nicely Johnson in the stage production Guys and Dolls.
