= Steve Pizzati =

Australian racing driver

- Born: 23 April 1975 (age 50); Melbourne, Victoria
- Occupations: Race car driver; instructor; TV presenter; journalist
- Known for: Top Gear Australia

Steve Pizzati is an Australian race car driver, driving instructor, television presenter and freelance motoring journalist. He was born in Melbourne to Italian parents and did not speak English until he was at school. He attended Cathedral College, East Melbourne and St Kevin's College, Toorak.

In 2008, he was selected from over 4,000 applicants to be one of the presenters of Top Gear Australia on SBS TV. In 2010, when Nine Network purchased the rights to the entire Top Gear franchise, he was the only host selected to continue with the new broadcaster, thus making him the only host to have been a part of all four series of the show.

Prior to Top Gear Australia, Pizzati competed in various national categories of Australian motor sport including winning races in the Australian GT championship, Formula Ford, Improved Production and Production racing. Alongside his motorsport activities, he has also been a professional driving instructor for various manufacturers in Australia and Europe, (mainly Porsche and Audi) since 1996.

In addition to the television show, Pizzati was a regular host of the Top Gear Live and Top Gear Festival shows having joined Top Gear UK hosts Jeremy Clarkson and Richard Hammond for the Top Gear Live stadium show at Acer Arena in Sydney in 2009 and 2015 as well as joining Jeremy Clarkson, James May and Shane Jacobson for the Top Gear Festival at Sydney Motorsport Park in 2013 and 2014 in front of an audience of over 30,000 people.

Since 2008, Radio 3AW Melbourne have used Pizzati as their motoring expert where he still has a regular program called "The Upshift" with Tom Elliott on the Mornings show every Tuesday at 10.30am.
