= Top Gear series 32 =

Series of a 2002 British TV show

Top Gear
- Series 32
- Starring: Freddie Flintoff; Chris Harris; Paddy McGuinness; The Stig
- No. of episodes: 5

Release
- Original network: BBC One
- Original release: 5 June – 3 July 2022

Series chronology
- ← Previous; Series 31 Next → Series 33

Series 32 of Top Gear, a British motoring magazine and factual television programme, was broadcast on BBC One and BBC One HD during summer 2022. It was the sixth series to feature the presenting line-up of Paddy McGuinness, Freddie Flintoff and Chris Harris and the fourth to be broadcast on BBC One, and the final series to be produced before production moved to Bristol for the thirty-third and final series.

The series' highlights included a full-length adventure trying local motorsport across Florida, the presenters creating their own TV cop cars, and two-part cheap car challenge where the presenters chose two cars each.

== Episodes ==
No. overall	No. in series	Reviews	Features/challenges	Original release date	UK viewers (millions)
231	1	None	Motorsport road trip across Florida	5 June 2022	4.45
232	2	None	Classic and future TV cop cars (Ford Gran Torino • Ferrari 308 GTS • Jaguar Mark 2 • Dodge Charger SRT Hellcat Widebody • Ford F-150 Raptor • Audi RS 3) • Turning a Sinclair C5 into a bobsleigh	12 June 2022	3.86
233	3	Lotus Emira	The presenters become HGV drivers (Scania 770S • Mercedes-Benz Actros• DAF XG+)	19 June 2022	4.09
234	4	Maserati MC20 • Rivian R1T	Reliable used cars for less than £500 (Mini Cooper • Volvo V70 • Mercedes C220 CDI • Honda Civic • Toyota Celica • Mazda 323F)	26 June 2022	3.96
235	5	Ford Puma ST • Ford Puma Rally1	1920s-style motorsport • History of BMW M cars • The future of fuel	3 July 2022	3.30
