= Top Gear series 33 =

Series of a 2002 British TV show

Top Gear
- Series 33
- Starring: Freddie Flintoff; Chris Harris; Paddy McGuinness; The Stig
- No. of episodes: 5

Release
- Original network: BBC One
- Original release: 30 October – 18 December 2022

Series chronology
- ← Previous; Series 32

Series 33 of Top Gear, a British motoring magazine and factual television programme. It was broadcast on BBC One and BBC One HD between 30 October and 18 December 2022. It was the seventh and final series to feature the presenting line-up of Paddy McGuinness, Freddie Flintoff and Chris Harris, the fifth and final series to be broadcast on BBC One, and the first and only series to be produced in Bristol, as the BBC wanted to produce more programming outside of London.

The series' highlights included a supercar road trip through Germany and Austria, a road trip across Thailand in second-hand pickup trucks, and forming a scratch-built race team to compete in the 2022 GT Cup Championship.

This is the last series of Top Gear to air due to production indefinitely going on hiatus due to presenter Freddie Flintoff being injured whilst filming for the planned 34th series. Unlike past series, where The Stig was either killed off or had their identity unveiled, the person behind the character remained secret until former host Jeremy Clarkson revealed it to be endurance racing driver Phil Keen during an interview in December 2024.

== Episodes ==
No. overall	No. in series	Reviews	Features/challenges	Original release date	UK viewers (millions)
236	1	Rimac Nevera	Road trip across Thailand in second-hand pickup trucks (Toyota Hilux • Isuzu D-Max • BMW E30)	30 October 2022	4.86
237	2	None	Supercar road trip through Germany and Austria (Ferrari 296 GTB • Porsche 718 Cayman GT4 RS • Pagani Huayra Roadster BC) • Treasure hunt around Paris in microcars (Citroen Ami • Carver • City Transformer)	6 November 2022	4.49
238	3	Mercedes-AMG ONE • Range Rover	F1 stock car racing	13 November 2022	4.57
239	4	Honda Civic Type-R • Peugeot 205 GTI	Team Top Gear at the GT Cup	20 November 2022	4.40
240	5	Ferrari Daytona SP3	Best delivery van for less than £3000 (Ford Transit • Vauxhall Astra • Volkswagen Caddy) • Best family car to buy today	18 December 2022	3.59
