= Tempting Fortune =

- Genre: Reality
- Presented by: Paddy McGuinness (2023–2025); Rob Beckett (2026–present)
- Theme music composer: Ian Livingstone
- Country of origin: United Kingdom
- Original language: English
- No. of seasons: 3
- No. of episodes: 18

Production
- Executive producers: Jon Crisp; Sanjay Singhal; Melanie Darlaston
- Production locations: Eastern Cape, South Africa (2023); Langkawi, Malaysia (2025–present)
- Running time: 60 minutes
- Production companies: Voltage TV and GroupM Motion Entertainment

Original release
- Network: Channel 4 (2023–present); The Roku Channel (2023)
- Release: 26 March 2023 – present

Tempting Fortune is a British reality competition television series where a group of people try to win the biggest cash prize they can by avoiding temptations to spend money from the prize fund.

The show was originally hosted by Paddy McGuinness with Rob Beckett taking over as host from the third series. The first series was filmed in the Eastern Cape province of South Africa during 2022, and premiered on Channel 4 on 26 March 2023. It was commissioned, as a co-production, in partnership with streaming platform Roku and was released by its programming brand Roku Originals. The show was renewed by Channel 4 in April 2024 but Roku was no longer a partner. The second series, set in Langkawi, Malaysia, began airing on 16 March 2025. A third series was announced in 2025, with McGuinness stepping down as host due to other commitments.

== Format ==
Tempting Fortune is a show where 12 strangers hope to win a share of a prize pot of £300,000. They are left in a remote location where they embark on a gruelling trek to reach their destination. All the participants are provided with only the basic survival gear and they have to spend many days without any creature comforts. Along the way they are tested with temptations, such as good food, luxurious accommodation, various home comfort or opportunity to skip a difficult part of the trek to see if they have the willpower to resist spending their money on these luxuries. Every temptation chosen by the participants will be subtracted from the final prize pool. The more they spend and the less money they will win at the end.

== Series overview ==
Series	Episodes	Presenter	Location	Premiere	Finale
1	6	Paddy McGuinness	South Africa	30 March 2023	10 April 2023
2	8	Paddy McGuinness	Malaysia	16 March 2025	7 April 2025
3	8	Rob Beckett	Malaysia	22 September 2026	10 November 2026

=== Series 1 (2023) ===
==== Contestants ====
Name	Age	Occupation	Temptation spending	Winnings
Ashton	28	Event singer	£600	£22,008
Carolynn	65	Retired Trauma Nurse	£4,283.33	£20,608
Charlie	25	Fish and Chip Shop Worker	£1,600	£21,008
Dan	31	Social Worker	£7,083.33	£19,608
Dee	44	Event Caterer	£7,983.33	£19,608
Jack	22	Content Creator	£5,516.66	£20,475
James	50	Ex-professional Basketball Player	£3,000	£22,608
Lani	33	Graphic Designer	£7,016.66	£20,475
Luke	39	Meditation Coach	£0	£22,608
Michelle	37	Works in Sales	£6,183.33	£20,508
Tahira	39	Field Organiser	£0	£22,608
Trewley-Precious	22	Social Media Influencer	£2,433.33	£20,175

==== Temptations ====
Temptation	Cost	Tempted contestants	Total spent	Notes
Easy route to next camp	£3,000 per person	None	£0	
Winnebago for the night	£8,000 per person	None	£0	This is available every night and was never used
Coffee	£200 per drink	None	£0	
Diner serving fast food	Various prices	Lani	£500	One milkshake
Luxury Safari Lodge Getaway	£4,000 for 2 people	None	£0	
Shortcut to next camp	£4,000 per person	None	£0	
Canoes instead of rafts	£4,000 for the whole group	None	£0	
Hot Chocolate	£400 per drink	Lani	£400	This was a temptation done in private. Lani only drinks half the drink.
Luxury Spa	£1,000 or £1,500 per person depending on package	Dan, Jack, Lani, and Michelle.	£4,500	Lani opted for the 'indulgence' package costing £1,500.
Vending machine	Various prices	Dan and Jack	£400	This was a temptation done in private as a pair and not given to any other contestants. They bought a bar of chocolate and shared it with everyone else.
Equipment	Various prices	Dee	£2,000	Dee needed new walking boots as she had misshapen them after leaving them too close to the fire. This wasn't a temptation per se.
Home Comforts package	£1,500 per person	None	£0	It included food and drinks, a mock living room with a chance to watch TV for the evening.
The teams are now split in two, those that have spent in one team, those that haven't in another
Alcohol	Various prices	Carolyn, Dan, Dee, Jack, and Michelle	£800	Carolynn, Dan, Jack, and Michelle shared a bottle of wine (£400 in total) and Dee had 2 beers (£400)
Phone call home	£100 per minute	Dan (7 minutes) and Dee (3 minutes)	£1,000	This temptation was done in private
Coffee and pastry	£200 for a coffee with a pastry	Carolynn and Lani	£200	Carolynn had the coffee and Lani had the pastry
A party	£3,500 per group	Carolynn, Dan, Dee, Jack, Lani, and Michelle	£3,500	Included food, drink, and a silent disco
Glamping Hotel	£3,000 per double bed	Carolynn, Dan, Dee, Jack, James, Lani, and Michelle	£12,000	Included food and drinks and breakfast the next morning. James stole some teabags despite not taking the full temptation but was charged as if he had.
Two groups are reunited as one team again
Donuts	£200 per donut	None	£0	
Bag taken directly to next camp	£500 per person	Michelle	£500	
Cocktail Bar	£300 for a cocktail, £200 for any other drink	Dee, Lani, Michelle	£900	Dee had wine, Lani had a cocktail and Michelle had 2 wines
Spending is now taken from your own personal funds left rather than the whole group
Safari	£1,500 per person	Carolynn, Dan, and Dee	£4,500	
Cocktail Bar	£300 for a cocktail, £200 for any other drink	Ashton, Charlie, Jack, Lani, Michelle, Trewley-Precious	£3,900	
Bubble Bath and a car ride halfway through trek	£100 per bath	Jack, Lani and Trewley-Precious	£100	Shared the bath
Last supper	£1,000 per person	Charlie, Dan, Dee, Jack, Lani, Michelle, Trewley-Precious	£7,000	A slap up meal and unlimited drinks
Shortcut to the finish line	£500 per person	Carolynn, Dan, Dee, Jack, Lani, Michelle, Trewley-Precious	£3,500	A car taking them directly to the finish line instead of trekking

Together the contestants spent £26,700 on temptations shown. However, the show jumps the amount between temptations and has the total spent as £28,700.

=== Series 2 (2025) ===
==== Contestants ====
Name	Age	Occupation	Temptations and spendings	Winnings
David Peterson	38	Vicar	£3,975 and £14,000 banked	£28,835
Henry Bowe	23	Amateur Footballer	£1,750 and £4,000 banked	£18,835
Hugo	20	University Student	£1,500*	£14,835
Imani Evans	32	Fashion Blogger	£9,250 and £1,500 banked	£16,335
Martha Armitage	24	Yacht Stewardess	£4,050 and £4,000 banked	£18,835
Nathaniel	29	Personal trainer	£12,925 and £10,000 banked	£24,835
Samantha "Sam" Willett	40	Ex restaurant owner	£3,075 and £4,000 banked	£18,835
Ted	58	Retired Prison Officer	£25,000 cost to fly home	£0
Thom	33	Hospitality Sales Manager	£2,850 and £4,000 banked	£18,835
Tomasz Wisniewski	39	Firefighter	£7,300	£14,835
Trish Tippett	59	Paramedic	£4,425	£14,835
Vicky	38	Greeting Cards Business owner	£4,425 and £30,000 to fly home	£0

- Hugo technically never chose to spend any money, this was a temptation where if enough people chose to do it (6 out of 10) it was offered to everyone. Hugo did not take the offer of the temptation despite it being paid for.

==== Temptations ====
Temptation	Cost	Tempted contestants	Total spent	Notes
Glamping beds	£1,200 per double bed	Imani	£1,200	Only started using it at 2am
Air conditioning cubicle	£200 per minute	Imani	£1,000	
Taxi to next campsite	£1,500 per person	Trish and Vicky	£3,000	
Pool Club	£2,000 per person	Imani and Tomasz	£4,000	
Flight home	£25,000	Ted	£25,000	Ted left on medical grounds so didn't have the additional £5,000 taken from the prize fund.
Glamping	£750 per person	Vicky	£750	The team was split into small groups for this task and offered it in smaller groups
Taxi to next camp	£1,000 per person	Imani and Vicky	£2,000	
The Nag's Head Pub	Various prices	Imani, Tomasz, and Vicky	£1,400	Imani had a Fanta, Tomasz had a pint of Guinness, Vicky had a portion of cheesy chips.
Home comforts	£300	David, Imani and Tomasz	£900	David had a packet of Haribo, Imani had a haircare kit and Tomasz had a donut. The temptation was done in secret without other teams members knowing of it was taken or not.
Hotel	£2,000 per double bed	Martha and Tomasz	£2,000	They shared a bed
Flight home	£25,000 + £5,000	Vicky	£30,000	
Coffee Shop	£250 for a coffee and pastry for two people	David, Nathaniel, Sam and Trish	£500	Sam gave her pastry to Trish
Chinese Buffet	£4,500 per group	Imani, Martha, Nathaniel, Thom and Trish	£4,500	3 or more members had to say yes to have it. They are split in two groups at this point.
The Retreat	Blind auction bid	Nathaniel	£10,000	The next highest bid was only £3,698. There was an option to take a second person which wasn't used.
Pick n Mix	Various prices	None	£0	Only temptation the group turned down
ATM	Various prices + £250 transaction fee	David, Henry, Imani, Martha, Sam and Thom	£23,000	Of those tempted everyone chose to take £4,000 except Imani who opted for £1,500.
Disco	£400 per person	David, Imani, Martha, Nathaniel, Tomasz and Trish	£2,400	
Video call home	£100 per minute	David, Imani, Sam, Thom and Tomasz	£3,000	
The Spa	Various prices	David and Tomasz	£2,000	Both spent £1,000 each.
Super Yacht	£10,000 for 5 people or £15,000 for 10 people	All	£15,000	Trish, Tomasz, Imani, Martha, David, Nathaniel all wanted to do it, unlocking the temptation for everyone. Hugo and Henry decide not to take temptation even though they technically paid for it.
£20,000 cash in a rucksack	£20,000	David and Nathaniel	£20,000	In pairs, couples went and could open the bag and take £20,000 between them or reject it. If everyone rejects the bag the funds stayed with the group as a whole. No other pair even looked in the bag.

Together the contestants spent £60,150 on temptations shown. The contestants took £41,500 from the prize fund and banked it for themselves.

=== Series 3 (2026) ===
==== Contestants ====
Name	Age	Occupation	Temptations and spendings	Winnings
Charlotte	33	Tourist Attraction Performer	£9,050 and £3,000 banked	£12,000
Cressida	56	PR Director	£8,750	£13,000
Jack	22	Medical Student	£2,400	£22,000
Jennie	47	Marketing Consultant	£8,550	£14,000
Kieran	29	Roofer	£6,650 and £10,000 banked	£17,000
Lucy	39	Support Worker	£11,450 and £2,000 banked	£13,000
Nico	38	Environmental Officer	£30,000	£0 withdrew due to leg injury following medical advice
Sam	47	Former Diplomat	£500	£19,000
Sarah	56	Dog Groomer	£8,733	£15,000
Shaf	29	Train Conductor	£8,550 and £10,000 banked	£15,499
Tierney	25	Retail Assistant	£5,690	£17,000
Yvonne	43	Teacher	£3,588	£25,000

==== Temptations ====
Temptation	Cost	Tempted contestants	Total spent	Notes
Jungle Store	£500 per item	Jennie, Nico and Lucy	£2,500	Jennie took 1 top and 1 pair of trousers, Nico took 2 pairs of trousers, and Lucy took 1 top.
Luxury camp	£3,000	None	£0	Sarah's group received it for free and could gift it to the second group for £3,000.
Long route/Short route	£1,500	None	£0	Jennie's group could choose a shorter route for Sarah's group to trek for £1,500.
Taxi	£2,000 to next camp	Sarah	£2,000	
Greggs	Various prices	Yvonne, Sarah and Tierney	£1,455	Yvonne had 2 chicken bakes (£480), Sarah had a steak bake, 2 drinks and a doughnut (£635), and Tierney had a steak bake and drink (£340).
Ice creams	£1,500	None (including free one)	£0	The camp leader could have had one for free regardless. The price was for remaining 11 ice creams.
Dishonesty Bar	Various prices	Jack and Sam	£700	Jack had a beer for £300 and Sam had a wine for £400.
Bag drop	£500	All	£500	Jennie, as team captain, could choose to drop their bags and not take them on a trek.
Champneys Spa	£1,500 or £1,000 guest pass with team captain	Jennie, Charlotte, Cressida, Tierney, Lucy and Sarah	£6,000	Jennie, as team captain, could go for free and take 3 guests for a reduced fee of £1,000.
KFC	Various prices	Yvonne	£400	Yvonne had a Zinger burger with fries.
Evacuated from Mudflats	£2,000 per rescue	None	£0	
Luxury cruise	£2,000	Charlotte, Cressida, Jack, Jennie, Lucy, Nico, Sarah, Shaf and Tierney	£18,000	
ATM	Various amounts + 10% foreign transaction fee	Kieran, Shaf, Charlotte and Lucy	£27,500	Kieran took £10,000, Shaf took £10,000, Charlotte took £3,000, and Lucy took £2,000.
Harry Ramsdens	Various prices	Sarah and Yvonne	£1,100	Sarah had fish, chips and curry sauce (£600), and Yvonne had fish and chips (£500).
Taxi to next camp	£2,000	None	£0	
£99 Land	Various prices	Yvonne and Sarah	£396	Yvonne bought cereal (£99), milk (£99) and biscuits (£99) with a 3 for 2 offer. Sarah bought crisps (£99), chocolate (£99) and juice (£99) with a 3 for 2 offer.
Full moon party	Backwards auction	Kieran, Shaf, Charlotte, Lucy, Cressida and Jennie	£33,300	Two teams had countdowns from £100,000 and said "stop" when the amount reached their chosen bid.
Taxi to next camp	£2,000	Nico, Sarah, Tierney and Yvonne	£8,000	
Flight home	£25,000 + £5,000 fee	Nico	£25,000	The additional £5,000 fee was waived because Nico was injured.
Phone call home	£150 per minute	Tierney	£150	The first 30 seconds of each call were free. All other contestants ended their calls after 30 seconds.
Teppanyaki restaurant	£100 per person (discounted)	Sam, Sarah, Kieran, Yvonne and Jack	£500	The group were offered a discounted price if they completed the daily trek in under four hours, which they achieved. The full price was not disclosed.
Fly home early	£12,500 for the person + £12,500 fee	None	£0	
Millionaire Mansion	Various	All 11 remaining contestants	£15,000	A blind vote allowed contestants to choose between spending nothing, meaning nobody could use the mansion; spending £5,000, allowing five contestants to use it; or spending £15,000, allowing everyone to use it.
Winnings Bags	Various	All remaining contestants	£157,499	Contestants went up one at a time, in an order picked by the group, to select their winnings in a bag, of various amounts. The highest bag of winnings; £25,000 and the lowest; £5,499.

Together the contestants spent £142,501 of the £300,000 potential prize pot on temptations shown. 4 of the contestants took £25,000 from the prize fund and banked it for themselves.

== Awards and nominations ==
Year	Award	Category	Result	Ref.
2024	Venice TV Awards	Reality TV	Won	
2023	TBI Content Innovation Awards	Reality Show of the Year	Won	
2023	Rose d’Or Awards	Competition Reality	Nominated	
2023	C21 International Format Awards	Best Competition Reality Format	Nominated	

== International versions ==
Color key

- Currently airing
- Upcoming version or season
- Unknown
- No longer airing/Cancelled

Country	Local name	Network	Presenter	Most money won	Originally aired
Greece	Tempting Fortune Greece	Skai TV	Yannis Tsimitselis	Series 1, 2024: Roula	17 September 2024
Italy	Money Road – Ogni tentazione ha un prezzo	Sky Uno; TV8	Fabio Caressa	Series 1, 2025: Yaser Qurum and Grazia Amas; Series 2, 2026: Marilina Nardozza	29 May 2025
Mexico	Tentados por la fortuna	TV Azteca	Sergio Mayer; Itatí Cantoral	Series 1, 2024: Freddy Bautista; Series 2, 2025: Jey Bazán, Julieta García, Verónica Santiago and Max Ramírez	27 May 2024
Norway	Ville fristelser	NRK1	Nathan Kahungu	Series 1, 2025: Rebecca Teclemariam; Series 2, 2026: Upcoming series	6 September 2025
Romania	Tempting Fortune România	Kanal D	Zoli Tóth	Series 1, 2025: Gabriel Muntianu	11 May 2025

== See also ==
- Stranded with a Million Dollars
