= List of The Roku Channel original programming =

The Roku Channel is an American streaming service which launched in September 2017. In 2021, The Roku Channel began releasing original programming branded as "Roku Originals", including acquisitions from the defunct Quibi service.

== Original programming ==
=== Drama ===
Title	Genre	Premiere	Seasons	Runtime	Status
Swimming with Sharks	Psychological drama	April 15, 2022	1 season, 6 episodes	20–26 min	Ended
The Spiderwick Chronicles	Fantasy	April 19, 2024	1 season, 8 episodes	40–49 min	Ended

=== Comedy ===
Title	Genre	Premiere	Seasons	Runtime	Status
Bill Burr Presents Immoral Compass	Sketch comedy	November 5, 2021	1 season, 10 episodes	7–8 min	Ended
The Now	Dark comedy drama	December 10, 2021	1 season, 14 episodes	7–10 min	Ended
Slip	Comedy drama	April 21, 2023	1 season, 7 episodes	25–30 min	Ended (Note: These shows were available at a time as Roku Originals, but have been since removed from the service.)
The Holiday Shift	Romantic comedy	November 17, 2023	1 season, 5 episodes	25–30 min	Ended

=== Animation ===
==== Adult animation ====
Title	Genre	Premiere	Seasons	Length	Status
Doomlands	Science fiction animated sitcom	January 28, 2023	2 seasons, 15 episodes	11 min	Ended

=== Non-English language scripted ===
==== Drama ====
Title	Genre	Premiere	Seasons	Length	Language	Status
Natural Born Narco	Crime drama	July 8, 2022	1 season, 15 episodes	6–10 min	Spanish	Ended

=== Unscripted ===
==== Docuseries ====
Title	Subject	Premiere	Seasons	Length	Language	Status
What Happens in Hollywood	Entertainment industry/Sexuality	August 13, 2021	1 season, 10 episodes	7–9 min	English	Ended
10 Weeks	Military	November 11, 2021	1 season, 10 episodes	8–9 min	English	Ended
Slugfest	Comic book industry	December 24, 2021	1 season, 10 episodes	6–10 min	English	Ended
The Fix	Addiction	January 21, 2022	1 season, 8 episodes	6–10 min	English	Ended
Moving the Needle with Dr. Woo	Celebrity/Tattooing	February 4, 2022	1 season, 5 episodes	7–8 min	English	Ended
Poly	Relationships/Sexuality	February 11, 2022	1 season, 8 episodes	5–9 min	English	Ended
This Joka	Stand-up comedy	March 4, 2022	1 season, 16 episodes	6–7 min	English	Ended
Mamas	Nature	May 6, 2022	2 seasons, 16 episodes	6–47 min	English	Ended
Surprise We're Pregnant	Pregnancy	May 6, 2022	1 season, 8 episodes	4–5 min	English	Ended
Mind/Trip	Mental health	May 27, 2022	1 season, 8 episodes	7–10 min	English	Ended
Roku Change Makers	Community service	January 11, 2023	4 seasons, 32 episodes	3–6 min	English	Pending
On the Edge with Juanpa (Note: Titled Carpe DM with Juanpa for season 1.)	Travel	March 11, 2024	2 seasons, 12 episodes	23–24 min	English	Pending
WWE: Next Gen	Sports	April 1, 2024	1 season, 8 episodes	27–30 min	English	Ended
Fight Inc: Inside the UFC	Sports	June 7, 2024	1 season, 3 episodes	48 min	English	Ended
Desde la raíz	Food	October 28, 2024	4 episodes	46–48 min	Spanish	Miniseries
Visionaries	Science/Technology	March 7, 2025	1 season, 8 episodes	38–45 min	English	Ended
Solo Traveling with Tracee Ellis Ross	Travel	July 25, 2025	2 seasons, 6 episodes	31–47 min	English	Pending
Soccer Meets America	Sports	May 3, 2026	3 episodes	44–47 min	English	Miniseries

==== Reality ====
Title	Genre	Premiere	Seasons	Length	Language	Status
Eye Candy	Cooking competition	August 13, 2021	1 season, 10 episodes	8–9 min	English	Ended
Squeaky Clean	Reality competition	August 13, 2021	1 season, 10 episodes	7–8 min	English	Ended
Idea House: Mountain Modern	Reality	July 28, 2022	1 season, 11 episodes	24 min	English	Ended
¡Que delicioso!	Cooking competition	November 25, 2022	1 season, 7 episodes	23–24 min	Spanish	Ended
The Great American Baking Show: Celebrity Holiday	Cooking competition	December 2, 2022	4 seasons, 4 episodes	62–76 min	English	Pending
The Cupcake Guys	Reality	January 18, 2023	1 season, 6 episodes	24 min	English	Ended
Team Rubicon	Reality	May 25, 2023	1 season, 13 episodes	24–46 min	English	Ended
Match Me in Miami	Dating show	June 9, 2023	1 season, 8 episodes	44–48 min	English	Ended
Morimoto's Sushi Master	Cooking competition	June 16, 2023	2 seasons, 12 episodes	45–49 min	English	Ended
Batalla en Abuela's Kitchen	Cooking competition	June 23, 2023	1 season, 6 episodes	24 min	Spanish	Ended
The Next Black Millionaires	Reality competition	July 7, 2023	1 season, 8 episodes	23–24 min	English	Ended
Lincoln Log Masters	Reality competition	July 14, 2023	1 season, 6 episodes	44–48 min	English	Ended
Reptile Royalty	Reality	July 21, 2023	2 seasons, 12 episodes	22–23 min	English	Ended
UFO Cowboys	Reality	July 28, 2023	2 seasons, 16 episodes	23–24 min	English	Ended
The Marriage Pact	Dating show	August 4, 2023	1 season, 8 episodes	44–48 min	English	Ended
Un millón de gracias	Reality	August 11, 2023	1 season, 10 episodes	13–16 min	Spanish	Ended
Honest Renovations	Reality	August 18, 2023	4 seasons, 18 episodes	44–48 min	English	Pending
Ring by Spring	Reality	September 15, 2023	1 season, 8 episodes	44–48 min	English	Ended
Serenata de las estrellas	Reality	October 13, 2023	1 season, 4 episodes	28–29 min	Spanish	Ended
Side Hustlers	Reality	March 1, 2024	2 seasons, 10 episodes	45–48 min	English	Ended
Dinner Budget Showdown	Cooking competition	May 3, 2024	1 season, 6 episodes	24 min	English	Ended
Empty Nest Refresh	Reality	May 10, 2024	1 season, 6 episodes	24 min	English	Ended
Celebrity Family Food Battle	Cooking competition	May 31, 2024	1 season, 6 episodes	24 min	English	Ended
The Charlie Puth Show	Docu-comedy	October 4, 2024	1 season, 6 episodes	21–24 min	English	Ended
Best Bite Wins	Cooking competition	October 18, 2024	1 season, 6 episodes	24 min	English	Ended
Honest Renovations: A Holiday Makeover	Reality	November 8, 2024	3 seasons, 3 episodes	49–62 min	English	Pending
Clash of the Cookbooks	Cooking competition	December 6, 2024	1 season, 6 episodes	24 min	English	Ended
The Great American Baking Show: Celebrity Big Game	Cooking competition	February 3, 2025	2 seasons, 2 episodes	65–71 min	English	Pending
The Great American Baking Show: Celebrity Summer	Cooking competition	August 16, 2025	2 seasons, 2 episodes	66–67 min	English	Pending
The Happy Mess Method	Reality	September 19, 2025	1 season, 6 episodes	41–44 min	English	Pending
This First House	Reality	April 27, 2026	1 season, 6 episodes	44–47 min	English	Pending
NFL Hometown Eats	Docu-reality	August 24, 2026	1 season, 3 episodes	23–24 min	English	Pending
Battle of the Streaming Stars	Reality competition	October 23, 2026	1 season, 1 episode	53 min	English	New episode due to premiere in 2027

==== Variety ====
Title	Genre	Premiere	Seasons	Length	Status
The Demi Lovato Show	Talk show	July 30, 2021	1 season, 9 episodes	5–7 min	Ended
Player vs. Player with Trevor Noah	Talk show	November 19, 2021	1 season, 8 episodes	6–7 min	Ended
Emeril Tailgates	Cooking show	September 8, 2022	4 seasons, 43 episodes	25 min	Ended
Martha Gardens	Gardening show	October 14, 2022	1 season, 12 episodes	25 min	Ended
Milk Street's Cooking School	Cooking show	October 28, 2022	1 season, 10 episodes	24 min	Ended
Milk Street's My Family Recipe	Cooking show	October 28, 2022	1 season, 6 episodes	23–24 min	Ended
Martha Cooks	Cooking show	November 14, 2022	5 seasons, 50 episodes	25 min	Ended
Emeril Cooks	Cooking show	November 18, 2022	5 seasons, 40 episodes	22–25 min	Ended
Martha Holidays	Cooking show	November 21, 2022	3 seasons, 16 episodes	25 min	Ended
Formula E Unplugged	Sports talk show	January 15, 2023	2 seasons, 14 episodes	23–26 min	Ended
Emeril Tailgates: The Postseason	Cooking show	January 19, 2023	1 season, 3 episodes	25 min	Ended
GMFB: Overtime	Sports talk show	July 29, 2024	2 seasons, 342 episodes	90 min	Season 2 ongoing
What Drives You with John Cena	Talk show	January 21, 2025	2 seasons, 8 episodes	23–25 min	Pending
Women's Sports Now	Sports talk show	March 20, 2025	1 season, 20 episodes	50–52 min	Ended (Note: Moved to ESPN+.)
Pregame with Matthew Berry	Sports talk show	September 28, 2026	1 season, 3 episodes	120 min	Season 1 ongoing

=== Sports ===
Title	Genre	Premiere	Length	Status
ABB FIA Formula E World Championship	Sports broadcast	December 7, 2024	Approx. 2–3 hours	Ongoing

=== Co-productions ===
These shows have been commissioned by The Roku Channel with a partner network.

Title	Genre	Partner	Premiere	Seasons	Length	Status
Children Ruin Everything (seasons 1–2)	Sitcom	CTV	May 13, 2022	2 seasons, 24 episodes	21 min	Ended (Note: Moved to The CW)
Panhandle	Comedy drama	Spectrum	September 26, 2022	1 season, 8 episodes	47–49 min	Ended
Tempting Fortune	Reality competition	Channel 4	June 23, 2023	1 season, 6 episodes	45–47 min	Ended
Fight to Survive	Reality competition	The CW	September 29, 2023	1 season, 8 episodes	43 min	Ended
Good Cop/Bad Cop	Crime comedy	Stan/Australia; The CW/United States	February 19, 2025	1 season, 8 episodes	42 min	Ended

=== Continuations ===
These shows have been picked up by The Roku Channel for additional seasons after having aired previous seasons on another network.

Title	Genre	Prev. network(s)	Premiere	Seasons	Length	Language	Status
Thanks a Million (season 2)	Reality	Quibi	August 13, 2021	1 season, 10 episodes	6–8 min	English	Ended
Punk'd (season 12)	Reality	MTV (seasons 1–9); BET (season 10); Quibi (season 11)	December 10, 2021	1 season, 10 episodes	5–7 min	English	Ended
Dishmantled (season 2)	Cooking competition	Quibi	December 31, 2021	1 season, 10 episodes	6 min	English	Ended
Reno 911! (season 8)	Comedy	Comedy Central (seasons 1–6); Quibi (season 7)	February 25, 2022	1 season, 11 episodes	21 min	English	Ended
Chrissy's Court (seasons 2–3)	Comedy/Arbitration-based court show	Quibi	June 17, 2022	2 seasons, 20 episodes	7–10 min	English	Ended
Murder House Flip (season 2)	Reality	Quibi	August 12, 2022	1 season, 10 episodes	24–25 min	English	Ended
Most Dangerous Game (season 2)	Action thriller	Quibi	March 10, 2023	1 season, 12 episodes	10–21 min	English	Ended
Die Hart (seasons 2–3)	Comedy action-adventure	Quibi	March 31, 2023	2 seasons, 15 episodes	9–19 min	English	Ended
The Great American Baking Show (seasons 6–9)	Cooking competition	ABC	May 5, 2023	4 seasons, 23 episodes	56–62 min	English	Pending
Chad (season 2)	Sitcom	TBS	January 19, 2024	1 season, 10 episodes	20–24 min	English	Ended
Kevin Hart's Muscle Car Crew (season 2)	Reality	Motor Trend	February 16, 2024	1 season, 6 episodes	26–29 min	English	Ended
Divina comida Mexico (season 3)	Cooking competition	HBO Max	February 17, 2025	1 season, 16 episodes	34–39 min	Spanish	Ended

=== Specials ===
These shows are one-time original events or supplementary content related to original TV shows.

Title	Genre	Premiere	Length
Zoey's Extraordinary Christmas	Musical comedy drama	December 1, 2021	99 min
Ryan's World Titan Universe Holiday Adventures	Children's live-action animation	November 18, 2022	23 min
A Very Demi Holiday Special	Holiday special	December 8, 2023	53 min
Chain Food: All-Star Dishes	Cooking documentary	July 12, 2024	53 min
The Great American Baking Show: Celebrity Halloween	Cooking competition	October 1, 2025	67 min
The Reunion: Laguna Beach	Reunion special	April 10, 2026	83 min

=== Exclusive international distribution ===
These series are programs that have aired on other networks where The Roku Channel has bought exclusive distribution rights to stream them in alternate regions on its own platform. The Roku Channel lists them as Roku Originals.

Title	Genre	Partner	Premiere	Seasons	Length	Language	Status
Cypher (season 1)	Crime drama	International syndication	March 19, 2021	1 season, 7 episodes	43–49 min	English	Ended (Note: Season 2 was picked up as a Roku Original.)
Operation Black Tide: Suicide Voyage	True crime docuseries	International syndication	March 11, 2022	4 episodes	39–46 min	Spanish	Miniseries
The Newsreader	Drama	ABC	March 18, 2022	1 season, 6 episodes	53–57 min	English	Ended (Note: The series was renewed by ABC for season 2, but has been removed from Roku.)
The Pact	Post-apocalyptic science fiction	International syndication	March 26, 2022	1 season, 6 episodes	29–42 min	English	Ended
Jann	Comedy	CTV	January 17, 2023	3 seasons, 22 episodes	19–22 min	English	Ended
Toast of Tinseltown	Comedy	BBC Two	August 11, 2023	1 season, 6 episodes	28 min	English	Ended
Malpractice	Medical drama	ITV	September 15, 2023	1 season, 5 episodes	44–47 min	English	Ended (Note: The series was renewed by ITV for season 2, but has been removed from Roku.)
Borderline	Crime drama	MGM+	September 1, 2024	1 season, 6 episodes	45–49 min	English	Ended

== Original films ==
=== Feature films ===
Title	Genre	Release	Runtime
Heathers: The Musical	Stage musical	September 16, 2022	2 h 15 min
Weird: The Al Yankovic Story	Biographical parody	November 4, 2022	1 h 48 min
How to Fall in Love by the Holidays	Holiday romantic comedy	November 3, 2023	1 h 28 min
First Time Female Director	Comedy	March 8, 2024	1 h 36 min
The Real Bros of Simi Valley: High School Reunion	Comedy	July 5, 2024	1 h 45 min
Jingle Bell Love	Holiday romantic comedy	November 18, 2024	1 h 21 min
Merry Little Mystery	Holiday romantic comedy	November 19, 2025	1 h 17 min
Jingle Bell Wedding	Holiday romantic comedy	December 5, 2025	1 h 20 min
Chef's Kiss	Romantic comedy	February 10, 2026	1 h 20 min
Broad Trip	Comedy	May 8, 2026	1 h 24 min
Summer Sparks	Romantic comedy	July 7, 2026	1 h 28 min
The Holiday Spark	Holiday romantic comedy	November 2, 2026	1 h 25 min
Second Chance Holiday	Holiday romantic comedy	November 5, 2026	1 h 18 min

=== Documentaries ===
Title	Subject	Release	Runtime
Meet Me in Paris	Romance/Docu-reality	February 10, 2023	1 h 11 min
NFL Draft: The Pick Is In	Sports	August 25, 2023	1 h 27 min
Meet Me in Rome	Romance/Docu-reality	February 9, 2024	1 h 25 min
A Radical Act: Renee Montgomery	Sports	October 16, 2024	1 h 44 min
Going, Going, Gone: The Magic of the Home Run	Sports	July 6, 2025	49 min
Gamechangers: The Ashlyn Harris Story	Sports	June 8, 2026	50 min
Gamechangers: America's Top 25 Female Athletes	Sports	July 2, 2026	50 min
Gamechangers: Mother/Athlete	Sports	October 2, 2026	44 min

== Upcoming original programming ==
=== Comedy ===
Title	Genre	Premiere	Seasons	Length	Status
Scarlett Holmes	Romantic comedy miniseries	2027	TBA	TBA	Series order
Tightrope!	Comedy	TBA	1 season, 6 episodes	TBA	Series order

== Upcoming original films ==
=== Feature films ===
Title	Genre	Release	Runtime
Cowboy Hearts	Romantic comedy	Early 2027	TBA

=== Documentaries ===
Title	Subject	Release	Runtime
Harlem Globetrotters 100th Anniversary Special	Sports	2027	1 h
The It Girls: Inside the 2000s	Celebrity	2027	TBA

== See also ==
- List of Quibi original programming
