= Tempting Fortune România =

- Genre: Reality
- Presented by: Zoli Tóth
- Country of origin: Romania
- Original language: Romanian
- No. of seasons: 1
- No. of episodes: 31

Production
- Production location: Dominican Republic
- Camera setup: Multiple-camera setup
- Running time: 1 hour and 45 minutes (including commercial breaks)
- Production companies: Voltage TV and GroupM Motion Entertainment

Original release
- Network: Kanal D
- Release: 11 May 2025 – present

Tempting Fortune România is a Romanian reality game show based on the international British format where a group of people try to win the biggest cash prize they can by avoiding temptations to spend money from the prize fund.

The show is hosted by Zoli Tóth. The filming for the first series started on 29 April 2025 in Dominican Republic and premiered on Kanal D on 11 May 2025. The first season ended on 27 July 2025, after the broadcast of all 31 episodes. Only 7 out of the 12 contestants made it to the final of the competition. Among them, Gabriel Muntianu, who accepted several secret temptations throughout the competition, ended up with the highest individual prize, amounting to €27,182.14.

== Format ==
Tempting Fortune is a show where 12 strangers hope to win a share of a prize pot of €300,000. They are left in a remote location where they embark on a gruelling trek to reach their destination. All the participants are provided with only the basic survival gear and they have to spend many days without any creature comfort. Along the way they are tested with temptations, such as good food, luxurious accommodation, various home comfort or opportunity to skip a difficult part of the trek to see if they have the willpower to resist spending their money on these luxuries. Every temptation chosen by the participants will be subtracted from the final prize pool. The more they spend and the less money they will win at the end.

== Broadcast ==
To begin with, the show was broadcast three days per week from Sunday to Tuesday at 21:00 p.m. on Sundays and 20:00 p.m. on Mondays and Tuesdays. Since then, the broadcast schedule has changed twice; starting from May 24, the show aired from Saturday to Monday. On Saturdays and Sundays, it aired at 21:00 p.m., and on Mondays at 22:00 p.m. Starting from July 2, the show was broadcast only on weekends at 21:00 p.m.

== Cast ==
The twelve contestants was announced by Kanal D on 23 April 2025. Notable contestants include the musician, Jean Gavril and artist, Tavi Clonda. The list of cast also includes contestants from other reality TV shows such as Roxana Buzoiu who was a contestant at Puterea Dragostei, Iasmin Agoston and Florin "Flow" Răduț who both participated at Chefi la cuțite and Adina Miuleasa who participated on season 6 of Mireasa and also at Insula de 1 milion.

Name	Age	Occupation	Hometown	Winnings	Finish	Ref.
Gabriel Muntianu	22	Tarot card reader	Iași, Iași	€27.182.14	1st	
Măriuța Costan	39	Purchasing manager	Arad, Arad	€24.182.14	2nd	
Deea Maxer	35	Entrepreneur	Bucharest	€23.432.14	3rd/4th/5th	
Diana Mocanu	27	Content creator	Bucharest	€23.432.14	3rd/4th/5th	
Lucreția Preda	56	Ballerina	Pitești, Argeș	€23.432.14	3rd/4th/5th	
Florin "Flow" Răduț	43	Cosmic monk	Roșiori de Vede, Teleorman	€18.432.14	6th	
Roxana Buzoiu	31	Content creator	Slobozia, Ialomița	€15.621.42	7th	
Jean Gavril	31	Musician	Constanța, Constanța	€0	Ejected (Note: Jean was disqualified from the competition due to his aggressive behavior towards Gabriel. With his exit, the group lost €25 000 from the total amount.)	
Flavius Malancu	26	YouTuber	Brașov, Brașov	€0	3rd Eliminated	
Adina Miuleasa	25	Influencer	Strehaia, Mehedinți	€0	2nd Eliminated	
Iasmin Agoston	29	Fitness instructor	Timișoara, Timiș	€0	1st Eliminated	
Tavi Clonda	45	Artist	Brăila, Brăila	€0	Tempted	

== Game ==
=== Temptations ===
#	Temptation	Cost	Tempted contestants	Total spent	Notes
Cycle 1: Total starting amount: €300.000; The remaining amount: €294.600
Ep. 1	Apple lemonade	€300 per person	Adina	€300	
Ep. 1	Carrot cake	€400 per person	Adina	€400	
Ep. 1	Six fully equipped canopies for a relaxing night in the jungle, each with a comfortable bed and mosquito net, a sleep mask and a hairbrush.	€600 for 6 people	Diana	€600	Diana had the possibility to keep the hairbrush for the rest of the competition.
Ep. 1	Mystery phone	€200	None	€0	This was a secret temptation. Deea was nominated by the group to participate.
Ep. 2	Mystery box	No price	Roxana	No price	Roxana won a 50% discount. This voucher does not apply to the secret temptations.
Ep. 2	Chocolate croissant / coffee	€200 / €150	None	€0	
Ep. 2	Quick ATV ride	€500 per person	None	€0	
Ep. 2	Fortune teller	€200 per person	None	€0	
Ep. 2	Hamburger and French fries / soft drink	€350 / €100 per person	Flavius, Gabriel and Tavi	€1 050	
Ep. 2	Icecream	€250	None	€0	This was a secret temptation to which only Flavius and Roxana were invited.
Ep. 3	Breakfast	€300 per person	Adina, Gabriel, Măriuța and Tavi	€1 200	
Ep. 3	Mystery box	No price	Tavi	No price	For this mystery box, there were two options. The first option – six cups of coffee that can be shared with five other people of your choice. The second option – a coffee thermos for one person only. Tavi chose to share the five cups with Adina, Diana, Măriuța, Roxana, and Gabriel.
Ep. 3	Personal hygiene products	€350 per person	Adina, Deea, Diana, Lucreția and Măriuța	€1 750	
Ep. 3	Hot water shower	€300 per person	Adina	€300	
Ep. 3	Tomahawk steak / refreshing drink	€500 / €100	None	€0	This was a secret temptation to which only Iasmin was invited.
Cycle 2: Total starting amount: €294.600; The remaining amount: €271.950
Ep. 4	Bowl of cereal, fruit, and yogurt	€250 per person	Adina	€250	
Ep. 4	Buggy	Various prices	None	€0	
Ep. 4	Shawarma / soft drink	€400 / €100	Adina, Deea, Diana, Flavius, Gabriel, Iasmin, Jean, Măriuța, Roxana and Tavi	€6 400	
Ep. 4	Pillows	€350	None	€0	The pillows can be kept for the entire the competition.
Ep. 4	20% of the final prize	€1 000	None	€1 000	This was a secret temptation to which only Gabriel was invited. He chose Flavius's account.
Ep. 5	Detox drinks	€250 per person	Adina, Falvius and Iasmin	€750	
Ep. 5	Pasta cooked by a chef / drink	€400 / €100	Adina, Falvius and Iasmin	€1 300	
Ep. 5	Air-conditioned room	€250 per person	None	€0	This temptation was only for two minutes.
Ep. 5	Biscuits / milk	€150 / €100	None	€0	This was a secret temptation to which only Lucreția and Tavi were invited.
Ep. 6	Drinks	Various prices	Flavius, Gabriel, Iasmin and Tavi	€1 600	
Ep. 6	Pizza / soft drinks	€400 / €100	Adina, Diana, Iasmin, Măriuța, Roxana and Tavi	€2 700	
Ep. 6	Laundry	€300	Adina, Gabriel and Lucreția	€900	
Ep. 6	Automated Teller Machine	€1 560	Măriuța	€1 560	This was a secret temptation to which only Măriuța was invited. She had two options: to send home the amount of €500 with a €50 commission, or to send home €1 500 with a €150 commission.
Cycle 3: Total starting amount: €271.950; The remaining amount: €238.700
Ep. 7	Orange juice / bruschetta	€250 / €100 per person	Adina, Roxana and Tavi	€550	
Ep. 7	Notebook and pen	€400	None	€0	
Ep. 7	Cabbage rolls and sour cream / soft drinks	€400 / €100	Flavius, Roxana and Tavi	€1 200	
Ep. 7	Mystery phone	€500	Tavi	€500 for two minutes	This was a secret temptation to which only Tavi was invited.
Ep. 7	Supermarket	Various prices	All group	€950	
Ep. 7	Plane ticket	€8 000 + €25 000 ( his share of the original prize)	Tavi	€33 000	Tavi left the competition.
Ep. 8	Picnic / orange juice	€250 / €100 per person	Adina and Iasmin	€600	
Ep. 8	A photo with loved ones	€400	Gabriel	€400	
Ep. 8	Movie night	€400	Diana	€400	Diana had the opportunity to choose 4 people to share the temptation. She chose Deea, Flavius, Gabriel and Iasmin. At the end of movie night, each contestant was asked to nominate one of the five they believed least deserved to remain in the competition. The group chose Gabriel. As a consequence of the vote, Gabriel was informed that from that moment until the following evening, any money spent by the group would be deducted from his personal budget. To protect his budget, Gabriel was given two options: either convince the four to change their minds, or persuade the rest of the group not to spend any money at all. Gabriel failed the missions therefore, €1 250 was deducted from his account.
Ep. 9	Basket of peanuts / coffee with milk	€300 / €150 per person	Adina	€900	
Ep. 9	Fast food / soft drinks	€350 / €100 per person	Adina	€350	
Ep. 9	Camp radio	€250 per person	None	€0	
Ep. 9	Luxury shoes	€6 000	None	€0	This was a secret temptation to which only Roxana was invited.
Cycle 4: Total starting amount: €238.700; The remaining amount: €231.150
Ep. 10	Pancakes with jam / tea	€350 / €100 per person	Adina and Roxana	€700	
Ep. 10	Mystery box	€0	Iasmin	€0	As part of this temptation, two mysterious boxes were presented. Once the first box was opened, the contestants were automatically required to open the second one as well, accepting the consequences of the game. Inside the second box were 10 red envelopes and a single white envelope. Jean drew the white envelope, thus earning immunity. The remaining contestants had to save themselves one by one through selection. Adina was the last one left unchosen and, with no form of protection, was automatically placed in danger of elimination.
Ep. 10	Favorite music	€400	None	€0	
Ep. 10	Comfort kit	€350	None	€0	
Ep. 10	€3 000 added to the personal account	€6 000	None	€0	This was a secret temptation to which only Lucreția was invited.
Ep. 11	Cakes / fruit juice	€250 / €150	Adina	€350	
Ep. 11	Homemade soap	€400 per person	Adina	€1 600	
Ep. 11	Mystery box	€0	Diana	€0	One contestant had to take a different path. By drawing lots, the contestant who went alone was Gabriel. At the end of the path, Gabriel won a lucky ticket that gave him a gift card. He was also able to decide which contestants would not participate in this episode's game. He chose Iasmin and Flavius.
Ep. 11	Cookies	€600	Adina	€600	This was a secret temptation to which only Adina was invited. Adina had two cookies — one for herself and one to give to another contestant. The rule was that whoever accepted the cookie from her would automatically be nominated for elimination along with Adina. She chose Gabriel. Because they both drew green cards at the end of the cycle, both Adina and Gabriel were saved from elimination.
Ep. 12	Magic boxes	€350 per person	Adina	€1 400	
Ep. 12	A letter from loved ones	€600	None	€0	This was a secret temptation to which only Jean, Lucreția and Măriuța were invited.
Ep. 12	The midnight box	€500 per person	Adina and Roxana	€250	Roxana used her 50% discount.
Cycle 5: Total starting amount: €231.150; The remaining amount: €217.050
Ep. 13	Patso / soft drinks	€300 / €100 per person	Adina and Iasmin	€600	
Ep. 13	SPA	€500	Adina and Iasmin	€1 000	This was a secret temptation to which only Adina, Diana and Iasmin were invited.
Ep. 13	Sparkling water with fruit	€250	Adina	€250	
Ep. 13	Hobby supplies	Various price	Group decision	€200	
Ep. 13	Mystery phone	€200	Măriuța	€200	This was a secret temptation to which only Măriuța was invited. At this temptation, Măriuța received a task. For two days, she will have to convince her teammates to spend as much money as possible. The money spent from the total amount will go directly into Măriuța's account. But if she gets eliminated before the final or if she gets exposed, she won't receive any money.
Ep. 14	Cinnamon roll / coffee	€350 / €100 per person	Adina, Flvius Iasmin, Lucreția and Măriuța	€2 750	
Ep. 14	Supply market	Various prices	Group decision	€800	
Ep. 14	Happy hour (beer / nuts)	€400 / €250	Adina	€250	
Ep. 14	Comfortable tent	€1 200 for two people	Adina and Măriuța	€2 400	
Ep. 14	Rice with milk	€250	None	€0	This was a secret temptation to which only Jean was invited.
Ep. 14	Chocolate biscuits	€250	None	€0	This was a secret temptation to which only Roxana was invited.
Ep. 14	Salad with tomatoes and cheese	€250	None	€0	This was a secret temptation to which only Flow was invited.
Ep. 15	Breakfast (Fried potatoes with eggs / orange juice)	€400 / €150 per person	Adina, Deea, Diana, Flavius, Iasmin and Lucreția	€2 550	
Ep. 15	Apple pie / coffee	€250 / €100	Adina, Falvius, Iasmin and Măriuța	€950	
Ep. 15	Ducks and the hunters	€1 000	Flavius	€1 000	The Hunter had to guess which duck made at least one purchase on a secret temptation. If the Hunter hits a duck that spent money—whether once or multiple times—on secret temptations, the highest amount they spent will be transferred from their account to the Hunter's private account. But if the Hunter guesses wrong, the money is lost from the group's total budget. Flavius pressed the button, officially becoming the Hunter, and he set his sights on Roxana. Unfortunately, Flavius didn't pick the right duck, and the group lost €1 000 from the total budget.
Ep. 15	Candy shop	Various prices	Adina, Iasmin and Roxana	€1 150	
Cycle 6: Total starting amount: €217.050; The remaining amount: €199.450
Ep. 16	Donut / frappe	€350 / €200 per person	Adina, Deea, Diana, Flavius and Iasmin	€4 100	
Ep. 16	Electronics store	Various prices	Gabriel and Lucreția	€4 600	This was a secret temptation to which only Gabriel and Lucreția were invited.
Ep. 16	Rice pilaf with chicken and vegetables / sof drinks	€550 / €100	Iasmin	€650	
Ep. 17	Hair care set	€600	None	€0	This was a secret temptation to which only Diana was invited.
Ep. 17	Minivan with music	€500 for 4 persons	Adina	€500	
Ep. 17	Shoe store (hiking footwear clogs)	€850 / €600	None	€0	
Ep. 17	Protein bar and energy drink	€350 / €250 per person	None	€0	
Ep. 17	Auction	€10 000	None	€0	The contestant who offers the most becomes the owner of a scooter.
Ep. 17	Mystery phone	€400	Flavius	€400	This was a secret temptation to which only Flavius was invited. In this temptation, Flavius had the opportunity to secretly order food in the camp, either for himself or for others. Favius chose Flow. Flow had an elimination coin on their plate. He decided to give the coin to Iasmin. Since Iasmin couldn't convince anyone to take the coin from him, he was eliminated from the competition.
Ep. 18	Breakfast buffet	€450 per person	Adina, Deea, Diana, Flavius, Gabriel, Iasmin, Jean, Lucreția, Măriuța and Roxana	€4 500	
Ep. 18	Foot massage	€550	None	€0	
Ep. 18	Tres Leches	€300	Adina	€300	This was a secret temptation to which only Adina and Jean were invited.
Ep. 18	Lounge	€850 person	Adina, Flavius and Iasmin	€2 550	
Cycle 7: Total starting amount: €199.450; The remaining amount: €166.550
Ep. 19	Toast bread	€350 per person	Adina	€350	
Ep. 19	Lasagna / sof drinks	€400 / €100	Deea, Diana and Flavius	€1 700	
Ep. 19	Second chance for Iasmin	€10 000	None	€0	This was a secret temptation to which only Jean was invited.
Ep. 19	Manicure and pedicure	Various prices	None	€0	
Ep. 19	Steals a card	€800	None	€0	This was a secret temptation to which only Adina was invited.
Ep. 20	Pancakes / orange juice	€350 / €150 per person	Adina and Flavius	€1 850	
Ep. 20	Personal hygiene kit	€400 per person	Adina	€400	
Ep. 20	Mystery box	No price	None	No price	Each person must vote for another person they believe spent the most money in the competition. That person will then nominate a second person who they believe also spent the most money in the competition. Adina was nominated by the group, and Gabriel was Adina's nomination. Both had to go down different paths according to the instructions in the two boxes they chose. Gabriel was saved due to the box he chose, but Adina put herself in danger. In order to save herself, Adina had to convince Jean to spend €2 500 by the end of the cycle; otherwise, she would be eliminated. Adina failed the mission, therefore she was eliminated.
Ep. 20	125 grams of gold	€20 000	Flow	€20 000	This was a secret temptation to which only Flow was invited.
Ep. 21	Steal a temptation from one of your teammates	Unknown	Adina, Diana, Gabriel, Flavius, Flow, Jean and Roxana	Unknown	This was a secret temptation to which the whole group were invited.
Ep. 21	Vitamin juice	€300	Adina	€300	
Ep. 21	Muffins	€350	Adina	€5 250	
Ep. 21	New clothes for hiking	Various prices	Adina and Măriuța	€3 150	
Cycle 8: Total starting amount: €166.550; The remaining amount: €159.500
Ep. 22	Fruit salad	€300	None	€0	
Ep. 22	Mystery box	No price	Flavius	No price	Flavius received a key.
Ep. 22	Grill / soft drinks	€550 / €100	Deea, Diana, Gabriel and Flavius	€1 750	
Ep. 22	Hotel	€800	None	€0	
Ep. 22	Luxury items	Various prices	None	€0	This was a secret temptation to which only Diana and Măriuța were invited.
Ep. 22	Mystery box	No price	Gabriel	No price	This was a secret temptation to which only Gabriel was invited. To benefit from the hidden advantage in the box, Gabriel had to convince Flavius to give him the key to open it. Gabriel failed and did not receive any advantage.
Ep. 22	Fast horseback route	€500	Diana	€500	
Ep. 22	Hairdressing salon	Various prices	None	€0	
Ep. 22	Video message from the family	€250	None	€0	This was not a secret temptation, but it was intended only for Gabriel and Flavius, and only one of them will be able to benefit from it.
Ep. 23	Mini-market	Various prices	All group	€2 750	
Ep. 23	Mystery card	€1 500	Falvius	€1 500	This was a secret temptation to which only Flavius was invited. Following the decision, Flavius was given the opportunity to steal €4 000 from a contestant of his choice. Flavius's choice was Gabriel.
Ep. 23	Pastry products	Various prices	Deea	€200	
Ep. 23	Milkshake	€350 per person	None	€0	
Cycle 9: Total starting amount: €159.500; The remaining amount: €156.000
Ep. 24	Chocolate cake	€350 per person	Flavius	€350	
Ep. 24	Mystery box	No price	All group	No price	The nine had to split into two groups, one of five and the other of four people, who would have to go on different paths, each with their own unique temptations. Group 1 – Flavius, Diana, Deea, and Măriuța. Group 2 – Flow, Jean, Roxana, Gabriel, and Lucreția
Ep. 24	Soft drink	€300	None	€0	
Ep. 24	Six mysterious boxes	€3 500	Deea, Diana and Flavius	€1 500	Along the path taken by Group 1, there were six mysterious boxes. Each box contained an envelope. Deea, Diana, and Flavius gave in to temptation, each choosing an envelope. Deea's envelope gave her the opportunity to find out who had taken a secret temptation. Deea exposed Flow. Diana's envelope gave her the opportunity to receive a card. While Flavius's envelope was empty.
Ep. 24	Dinner	€500	Roxana	€500	Roxana had the opportunity to choose four more people to eat with her. Her choice was: Gabriel, Flow, Jean and Măriuța. After having the meal, the five were forced to vote for a person who would be at risk of elimination. The group nominated Gabriel.
Ep. 24	Chef's special omelette	€400	None	€0	
Ep. 25	Taco / soft drinks	€500 / €100	None	€0	
Ep. 25	A home-like apartment	€1 000 for two person	None	€0	
Ep. 25	Silent party	€500 per group	Deea, Diana and Flavius	€500	Diana had to secretly choose which of the two she felt closer to. The chosen person would be safe, while the other would be nominated for elimination. Diana chose Deea, so Flavius was sent into elimination alongside Gabriel.
Ep. 25	Coffee	€350	None	€0	
Ep. 25	Fondue	€350	Flavius	€350	
Ep. 25	Chicken wings and French fries / sof drink	€400 / €100	None	€0	
Ep. 25	Mystery box	No price	All group	No price	A message from Iasmin through which the group was warned about Gabriel's game strategy.
Cycle 10: Total starting amount: €156.000; The remaining amount: €
Ep. 26	Cheese pide / balck tea	€300 / €100	None	€0	
Ep. 26	Delicious pudding	€350	None	€0	
Ep. 26	Home-style cooking	€500	Deea, Diana, Gabriel and Roxana	€2 000	
Ep. 26	18-carat gold ring adorned with a 0.14-carat diamond	€3 000	None	€0	This was a secret temptation to which only Jean was invited.
Ep. 26	A 7-day, 6-night vacation in Bali with a loved one	€20 000	None	€0	This was a secret temptation to which only Diana was invited.
Ep. 26	Personal grooming kit	€450	None	€0	
Ep. 26	The secret message	No price	All group	No price	The message was hidden in a bottle in the forest. Diana found the bottle with the message and received a secret temptation.
Ep. 27	Seafood	Various prices	Gabriel, Lucreția and Jean	€1 450	
Ep. 27	Campfire kit	€600	All group	€600	
Ep. 27	A romantic dinner with your loved one	€20 000	Diana	€0	This was a secret temptation that only Diana took part in, as a reward for finding the bottle.
Ep. 27	Lunch pack	€300	Măriuța	€300	
Ep. 27	Scalp massage	€500	None	€0	
Ep. 27	Surprise meal / sof drink	€400 / €100	Deea, Gabriel and Roxana	€2 400	
Ep. 27	Phone call with the children	€5 000	None	€0	This was a secret temptation to which only Deea was invited.
Ep. 27	A luxury watch	€20 000	None	€0	In order to keep the watch, Gabriel must stay until the end of the competition; if he is eliminated, he will lose the watch.
Cycle 11: Total starting amount: €124.550; The remaining amount: €121.450
Ep. 28	Delicious dessert	€250	None	€0	
Ep. 28	Easy VIP route	€500	Deea	€500	
Ep. 28	Perfume stand	€400	None	€0	
Ep. 28	Mystery box	Unknown	None	Unknown	
Ep. 28	Baklava	€500	None	€500	This was a secret temptation to which only Deea, Flow and Roxana were invited.
Ep. 28	Romanian cheese donuts	€250	Diana, Lucreția, Măriuța and Roxana	€1 000	
Ep. 28	5 months of rent paid	€20 000	None	€0	This was a secret temptation to which only Roxana was invited.
Ep. 28	Sandwich / sof drinks	€350 / €100	None	€0	
Ep. 29	Hammocks	€500 for two persons	None	€0	
Ep. 29	A 3.9-carat diamond necklace	€18 000	Nome	€0	This was a secret temptation to which only Măriuța was invited.
Ep. 29	Grilled Romanian sausages (mici) with French fries / sof drink	€400 / €100	Deea and Gabriel	€800	
Ep. 29	Brownie and cookies	€150	Deea and Roxana	€450	
Ep. 29	Chinese restaurant	Various prices	None	€0	
Ep. 29	Message from mom	€5 000	None	€0	This was a secret temptation to which only Gabriel was invited.
Ep. 29	Hot shower	€350	Deea	€350	
Cycle 12: Total starting amount: €121.450; The remaining amount: €109.350
Ep. 30	Snacks and refreshing drinks	Various prices	Diana, Gabriel and Măriuța	€1 250	
Ep. 30	Waffles	€300	Deea and Diana	€300	This was a secret temptation to which only Deea and Diana were invited.
Ep. 30	Course	No price	All cast	No price	The contestants had to choose a coin each from a set of seven, each one a different color but identical in size and weight, with the only difference being the design on one side. Each contestant picked a coin one by one, and once Zoli started the timer, they had exactly two minutes to ensure that all seven coins ended up in the hands of a single person. If the two-minute limit was exceeded, €25 000 would be deducted from the total amount. If the time went over four minutes, the penalty increased to €50 000. Gabriel successfully collected all seven coins, so he was given the opportunity to choose one of the two envelopes offered by Zoli. As a result of choosing the envelope, Gabriel was given the opportunity to deduct €5 000 from the total budget of a contestant of his choice, and that amount would be transferred to his own account. Gabriel chose Flow, resulting in €5 000 being deducted from Flow's budget and transferred to Gabriel's account.
Ep. 30	Disco	€500	Deea, Diana, Gabriel, Măriuța and Roxana	€2 500	
Ep. 30	Hot dog with French fries and a soft drink	€400 / €100	Diana, Gabriel, Măriuța and Roxana	€1 700	
Ep. 30	The option to exclude a contestant from the next game	€400	Măriuța	€400	This was a secret temptation to which only Măriuța was invited. She chose Diana.
Ep. 30	Gift store	Various prices	None	€0	
Ep. 31	The Last Supper	€400	Gabriel, Măriuța and Roxana	€1 200	
Ep. 31	Tatto	€700	Gabriel and Măriuța	€1 400	
Ep. 31	Photo shoot	€150	All group	€150	
Ep. 31	Cake	€300	Deea, Diana, Gabriel, Lucreția, Măriuța and Roxana	€3 000	

== Reception ==
The first episode of the show aired by Kanal D on May 11 had a strong debut, gathering over 1 million viewers at the peak minute (21:11), and an average audience of over 900,000 viewers throughout its broadcast (9:00 PM–10:30 PM). At the national level, Kanal D ranked second, after Pro TV, and ahead of DigiSport and Antena 1. In urban areas and on the 21–54 urban commercial demographic, the show ranked third, behind Pro TV and DigiSport, but ahead of Antena 1.

== See also ==
- Expedition Robinson
- Exathlon
- Insula de 1 milion
- Survivor
