= Russell Grant =

British astrologer and media personality (born 1951)

- Born: Russell John Dammerall Grant; 5 February 1951 (age 75); Hillingdon, Middlesex, England
- Occupations: Media personality, author, astrologer
- Years active: 1979–present
- Partner: Doug Beaumont (1972–)
- Website: Official Website

Russell John Dammerall Grant (born 5 February 1951) is a British astrologer and media personality. He has written several books on astrology, provides syndicated newspaper horoscopes and operates premium rate astrology phone lines. In March 2010, he began offering a "Pet Psychic" service. He is also the author of The Real Counties of Britain, and founded the Association of British Counties in 1989.

Grant participated in the ninth series of Strictly Come Dancing in 2011 and appeared in Celebrity MasterChef in 2014.

== Early life ==
Grant was raised in a council house in the 1950s, his father working as a sales rep for a car accessory business. Later, his parents worked at Pinewood Studios: his mother Jo dealt with contracts, and his father was a set designer. Grant spent most of his childhood in the care of his grandparents. After losing both his grandmothers, Lily Grant and Alice, to Alzheimer's disease, Grant suffered clinical depression, and once weighed 27 stone (172 kg).

== Career ==
=== Early career ===
Grant's original career was as an actor, and he performed in a variety of productions, including Tom Brown's Schooldays with Keith Chegwin, who shared a similar career path from acting to television. Grant has also worked as a Redcoat at Butlin's Holiday Camps.

Grant first appeared on television talking about astrology in 1979, featuring in the Yorkshire Television programme Extraordinary, presented by Valerie Pitts and Melvin Harris. Grant was the regular astrologer on Granada Television's Live from Two which ran from 1980 to 1981. He is best known for his appearances on breakfast television joining BBC's Breakfast Time to present the Your Stars section from 1983 to 1986. In 1986 he joined TV-am as resident astrologer appearing on Good Morning Britain and After Nine until 1990. Later from 1992 to 1995 he was a regular expert on This Morning with Richard and Judy offering astrological advice.

In 1983 Russell Grant and the Starlettes released cover versions of the songs "No Matter What Sign You Are" and "Where Is Love?".

Grant has also taken the role of presenter on several shows, including Star Choice, a celebrity quiz show based on the zodiac. In 1991 he co-hosted with Miriam Stoppard episodes of daily show People Today and in 1994 Grant had his own six-episode series, Russell Grant's All Star Show.

Following the launch of Channel 5, Grant presented Wideworld, a series in which members of the public were encouraged to make historical records for future generations. He also directed and starred in Russell Grant's Postcards from 1998 to 2002, which was a collection of over 100 five-minute travelogues produced by his own production company, Russell Grant's World Productions.

=== 2003–2005: Television presenting ===
In 2003 Grant presented a series of eight programmes called Russell Grant's Sporting Scandals for ITV and in 2004 presented The Russell Grant Show for Sky One. On Bingo Night Live, in 2008, pre-recorded videos of Grant were shown, in which he gave opinion on the chances of winning based on his horoscope readings.

=== 2006–2011: Reality television ===
In January 2006, Grant took part in the fourth series of Celebrity Fit Club. In May 2010, he appeared on Kitchen Burnout on ITV and in January 2011 he visited Turkey as part of Channel 4's Celebrity Five Go to....

=== 2011–12: Strictly Come Dancing and theatre ===
On 6 September 2011, it was announced that Grant would take part in the ninth series of Strictly Come Dancing. In the launch show, on 10 September, he was partnered with professional dancer Flavia Cacace. He was eliminated from the competition on 20 November 2011 at the show's Wembley Arena weekend.

Grant also appeared in the 2012 series of Strictly Come Dancing: It Takes Two as 'Stat Man', with a guide to the numbers of winners of Strictly Come Dancing.

It was revealed in October 2012, that the annual Children in Need Appeal Night would feature a Strictly Come Dancing special, it featured Grant alongside Ann Widdecombe.

Beginning performances on 14 February 2012, Grant took over from Michael Crawford in the titular role of The Wizard of Oz. The 2011 revival played at the London Palladium and featured new music by Andrew Lloyd Webber and Tim Rice. Grant played a limited 12-week engagement through 6 May 2012, starring alongside Sophie Evans as Dorothy.

| Week | Dance/Song | Judges' scores | Total Scores | Result |
| 1 | Cha-cha-cha / "Venus" | 4,5,6,6 | 21 | Safe |
| 2 | Salsa / "Dancing Queen" | 6,6,6,7 | 25 | Safe |
| 3 | Foxtrot / "Don't Rain on My Parade" | 6,7,7,8 | 28 | Safe |
| 4 | Tango / "Sweet Dreams (Are Made of This)" | 5,6,6,7 | 24 | Safe |
| 5 | Samba / "Better the Devil You Know" | 4,6,6,6 | 22 | Safe |
| 6 | Paso Doble / "Carmen" | 4,7,6,7 | 24 | Safe |
| 7 | American Smooth / "I Am What I Am" | 5,7,7,7 | 26 | Safe |
| 8 | Jive / "Reach" | 5,6,6,7 | 24 | Eliminated |

=== 2014: Celebrity MasterChef ===
On 24 May 2014, it was announced that Grant would be taking part in the ninth series of Celebrity MasterChef. The series began airing on 10 June 2014 with Grant taking part in the first two episodes of the series until he was eliminated on 12 June, one stage away from reaching the semi-finals.

The first challenge was the Mystery box task, where Grant made two types of Spring Rolls. The outside challenge saw Grant, along with Jodie Kidd go to Babbo, a high-end Italian restaurant in Mayfair, London. Grant had to make a dish in order to impress the head chef. The third and final challenge of the episode saw Grant cook a two-course meal for the judges. The meal had to be inspired by something or someone. Grant made his Aunt's Fish and Chips & Bread and Butter pudding.

On the second episode dated 12 June 2014, Grant needed to identify a variety of ingredients and making Brandy snaps with piped ginger cream in the knowledge and skills test. The outside challenge was to cook for 120 people at Mount Pleasant in North London. He also then cooked for three previous Celebrity MasterChef finalists. He cooked Three counties sausage toad in the hole and Honey, cinnamon and Apple crumble with custard and was eliminated from the contest.

=== Guest appearances ===
- Celebrity Stars in Their Eyes (27 December 2003) – Contestant
- Who Wants to Be a Millionaire? – Contestant
- Loose Women (21 October 2011, 12 March 19 November 2012, 11 April 2013) – Guest
- This Morning (14 November 14 December 2011, 7 March 21 June, 23 July 31 August 2012, 6, 20 September 4, 18 October 2013) – Guest
- Daybreak (23 November 2011, 22 May 2013) – Guest
- Paddy's Show and Telly (29 December 2011) – Contestant, won £10,000 for Alzheimer's Society
- Lorraine (20 January 24 August 2012) – Guest
- The Alan Titchmarsh Show (30 January 2012, 6, 28 February 10 September 2013) – Guest
- All Star Family Fortunes (11 February 2012) – Contestant, won £10,000 for Alzheimer's Society
- Pointless Celebrities (2 June 2012) – Contestant, alongside Carol Smillie
- Let's Do Lunch with Gino & Mel (21 August 2012) – Guest
- Britain's Secret Treasures (31 October 2013) – Reporter
- The Chase: Celebrity Special (21 December 2013) – Contestant, won £0, as he was caught by the "chaser"
- The Guess List (24 May 2014) – Guest
- Celebrity Squares (8 October 2014) – Guest

== Personal life ==
Grant's original career was as an actor and he performed in a variety of productions including Tom Brown's Schooldays with Keith Chegwin who shared a similar career path from acting to television. It is through this work he met his partner Doug Beaumont, who worked as a stagehand in a Blackpool theatre.

Grant helped design the badge for Brentford F.C., the team he supports, though he has been a keen follower of all non-league clubs in Middlesex since the 1950s, having regularly attended games at various clubs during childhood. He is a patron of Wealdstone F.C., Staines Town F.C., and - since 2022 - Staines & Lammas (Middlesex) F.C..

Grant has worked as a Redcoat at Butlin's Holiday Camps.

Grant moved to Cardiff in 1969 then lived in Barry for 20 years as well as Usk near Abergavenny. He now lives near the village of Maentwrog, Merionethshire, and has learnt basic Welsh. Grant has been with his partner Doug Beaumont, who is also his manager, for 50 years.

In 1996 Grant purchased the title "Lord of the manor of Ashford".

On 1 March 2023, Grant announced that he had undergone surgery for brain cancer in December 2022, and that he was now in recovery.
