= Chris Harris on Cars =

- Genre: Motoring
- Created by: BBC Worldwide
- Presented by: Chris Harris
- Country of origin: United States
- Original language: English
- No. of seasons: 1
- No. of episodes: 7

Original release
- Network: BBC America
- Release: July 11 – August 22, 2016

Related
- Top Gear

Chris Harris on Cars is a British-American motoring television series, presented by Chris Harris, and broadcast by BBC America from July 11, 2016. It is a spinoff show to Top Gear, and is also a television rebooted series of YouTube motoring series Chris Harris on Cars. The series concluded on August 22, 2016 and was replaced by Top Gear America in 2017.

== Production ==
In July 2016, it was announced that Top Gear presenter Chris Harris would be broadcast on BBC America, starting on July 11, 2016. The show features the same title as Harris' YouTube channel. BBC America have also used the same title card from the Chris Harris on Cars YouTube channel.

In September 2016, Harris announced that the show had gone on hiatus, in order for him to concentrate on filming Top Gear. The show has been cancelled due to the announcement of Top Gear America.

== Episodes ==
No.	Title	Reviews	Original release date
1	Episode 1	Porsche 911 GT3RS • Aston Martin GT12 • McLaren 650S	July 11, 2016
2	Episode 2	Ferrari 488 GTB • Ferrari 212	July 18, 2016
3	Episode 3	McLaren 570S • Bugatti EB 110	July 25, 2016
4	Episode 4	V8 Mercedes-AMG GT S • Citroen 2CV	August 1, 2016
5	Episode 5	BMW M3 • Lexus RC F • Porsche Cayman GT4	August 8, 2016
6	Episode 6	Mercedes-Benz AMG C63	August 15, 2016
7	Episode 7	McLaren P1 • LaFerrari • Porsche 918 Spyder	August 22, 2016

== Broadcast ==
The show is broadcast internationally on BBC Brit in countries such as: Australia, South America, South Africa, Poland and Scandinavia. It will not be aired in the United Kingdom.

== Reception ==
Chris Harris on Cars is competing against Harris' other new show Chris Harris Drives, which airs on the official Top Gear website. He has since "said goodbye" to his Chris Harris on Cars YouTube channel, as he is "really busy" with his new shows.
