= Benchmark (game show) =

- Genre: Game show
- Presented by: Paddy McGuinness
- Country of origin: United Kingdom
- Original language: English
- No. of series: 1 (inc. 1 celebrity)
- No. of episodes: 30 (inc. 5 celebrity)

Production
- Production location: Dock10
- Running time: 60 minutes (inc. adverts)
- Production company: Victory Television

Original release
- Network: Channel 4
- Release: 1 June – 31 December 2015

Benchmark is a British game show that aired on Channel 4 from 1 June to 31 December 2015. It was hosted by Paddy McGuinness.

== Background ==
The show was recorded at Manchester's MediaCityUK and was first broadcast on 1 June 2015. The show has been described as "a blend of the survey questions from 8 Out of 10 Cats and the higher/lower element from Play Your Cards Right". Paddy McGuinness, the host, has said that he found the two-show-a-day filming schedule somewhat hectic, and found himself phoning Bradley Walsh as to how it was possible.

== Gameplay ==
=== Round 1 ===
Two contestants out of eleven face a qualifying question; whichever contestant is closest plays for £25,000. The two contestants which face the qualifier are those who have fared best in the previous show.

=== Round 2 ===
The qualifying contestant faces seven questions, which they must answer higher or lower to; each of the other ten contestants answer a question, such as "What percentage of dating website users are already married?" or "How much wine does the average French(wo)man drink in a year", and the nearest few answers – seven in the first four questions, three in the final three questions) form a benchmark. The contestant must then answer higher or lower as to where the correct answer is in relation to the benchmark. Correct answers move the contestant up the money ladder; they start at £50, £100 and £250, and can work up to £10,000, £15,000 and £25,000. After four questions have been answered, a "bench bonus" is offered, which means a correct answer rides the player two places up the money ladder, but if it is used on an incorrect answer, the bonus is wasted. The bonus is essential in order to end up with £10,000 £15,000 and £25,000. In celebrity versions, the final two amounts are changed to £20,000 and £50,000.

| £50 | £100 | £250 | £500 | £1,000 | £2,000 | £4,000 | £6,000 | £10,000 | £15,000 | £25,000 |
| £50 | £100 | £250 | £500 | £1,000 | £2,000 | £4,000 | £6,000 | £10,000 | £20,000 | £50,000 |
| £50 | £100 | £250 | £500 | £1,000 | £2,000 | £4,000 | £6,000 | £10,000 | £15,000 | £25,000 |
| £50 | £100 | £250 | £500 | £1,000 | £2,000 | £4,000 | £6,000 | £10,000 | £20,000 | £50,000 |
| £50 | £100 | £250 | £500 | £1,000 | £2,000 | £4,000 | £6,000 | £10,000 | £15,000 | £25,000 |
| £50 | £100 | £250 | £500 | £1,000 | £2,000 | £4,000 | £6,000 | £10,000 | £20,000 | £50,000 |
| £50 | £100 | £250 | £500 | £1,000 | £2,000 | £4,000 | £6,000 | £10,000 | £15,000 | £25,000 |
| £50 | £100 | £250 | £500 | £1,000 | £2,000 | £4,000 | £6,000 | £10,000 | £20,000 | £50,000 |
| £50 | £100 | £250 | £500 | £1,000 | £2,000 | £4,000 | £6,000 | £10,000 | £15,000 | £25,000 |
| £50 | £100 | £250 | £500 | £1,000 | £2,000 | £4,000 | £6,000 | £10,000 | £20,000 | £50,000 |
| £50 | £100 | £250 | £500 | £1,000 | £2,000 | £4,000 | £6,000 | £10,000 | £15,000 | £25,000 |
| £50 | £100 | £250 | £500 | £1,000 | £2,000 | £4,000 | £6,000 | £10,000 | £20,000 | £50,000 |
| £50 | £100 | £250 | £500 | £1,000 | £2,000 | £4,000 | £6,000 | £10,000 | £15,000 | £25,000 |
| £50 | £100 | £250 | £500 | £1,000 | £2,000 | £4,000 | £6,000 | £10,000 | £20,000 | £50,000 |
| £50 | £100 | £250 | £500 | £1,000 | £2,000 | £4,000 | £6,000 | £10,000 | £15,000 | £25,000 |
| £50 | £100 | £250 | £500 | £1,000 | £2,000 | £4,000 | £6,000 | £10,000 | £20,000 | £50,000 |
| £50 | £100 | £250 | £500 | £1,000 | £2,000 | £4,000 | £6,000 | £10,000 | £15,000 | £25,000 |
| £50 | £100 | £250 | £500 | £1,000 | £2,000 | £4,000 | £6,000 | £10,000 | £20,000 | £50,000 |

=== Round 3 ===
The contestant is asked three questions, and requires the contestant to get as close as possible. The three amounts of money are marked in 1% increments with 100% being at the end. For each question, they are allowed to ask one of the benchmarkers, but each benchmarker can only be asked once. For every 1% they are out by, they slip one point down the money ladder. Thirty-three points and they lose the highest figure in the money ladder; sixty-six points and they lose the middle figure.

After the round is over, the two highest scoring and single lowest scoring benchmarkers are announced; the highest scoring play the first round in the next show, and the lowest scoring is eliminated.

== Reception ==
Frances Taylor of BT Group berated the show's lack of "real jeopardy or edge-of-your-seat tension" and "real general knowledge to tackle from the sofa at home, [making] it ... difficult to really engage and care about the answers you were guessing yourself", though praised McGuinness' "good job of holding everything together" and "real rapport with the contestants", summing up by saying that it "fell short of the mark".
