= Russell Grant's All Star Show =

Russell Grant's All-Star Show is an eight part astrological television show was produced by Granada Television thataired from 19 July to 6 September 1994 on afternoons on the ITV channel.

It was hosted by Russell Grant, and combined interviews with celebrity guests, audience participation and competitions. Grant also carried out various investigations, including whether Love-at-first-sight might have any astrological significance. The show was a ratings hit, clocking up the then best afternoon audiences of all time.

Grant's celebrity guests included Stephanie Beacham, Cilla Black and Barbara Windsor.

== Episodes ==
- Episode 1: [19 July 1994] – Guests: Michael Ball, Mandy Smith
- Episode 2: [26 July 1994] – Guests: Karren Brady, David Sullivan
- Episode 3: [2 August 1994] – Guests: Zsa Zsa Gabor, Michael Praed
- Episode 4: [9 August 1994] – Guests: Lynne Perrie, John McCririck, Paul McKenna
- Episode 5: [16 August 1994] – Guests: Ken Morley, Koo Stark
- Episode 6: [23 August 1994] – Guests: Stephanie Beacham
- Episode 7: [30 August 1994] – Guests: Jane Seymour
- Episode 8: [6 September 1994] – Guests: Cilla Black, Barbara Windsor
