= Paddy's Show and Telly =

- Presented by: Paddy McGuinness
- Country of origin: United Kingdom
- Original language: English
- No. of episodes: 2

Production
- Production location: BBC Television Centre
- Running time: 60 minutes (inc. adverts)
- Production companies: Twofour and GroupM

Original release
- Network: ITV
- Release: 29 December 2011 – 22 December 2012

Paddy's Show and Telly is a British one-off quiz game show that aired two editions on ITV on 29 December 2011 and 22 December 2012, hosted by Paddy McGuinness.

== Format ==
The format of the show involves three rounds, and three different teams. The first round features a board which contains six different categories. Each team must pick one of the categories, and thus, must answer one major question on the subject. They are then asked three sub-related questions, and overall, can earn up to a total of forty points.

The second round involves a telly carousel, which contains twelve different video clips from programmes. Paddy begins by starting the carousel, and when it stops, each team are asked to watch the clip and answer four questions on it. Thus, another forty points are on offer. The team with the fewest points at the end of round two are eliminated.

The final round involves Paddy's planner, where the two remaining teams go head-to-head by answering a series of questions based on programmes featured in an interactive Sky television planner. The team who answer the most questions correctly in the final round are awarded £20,000.

== Episodes ==
Key	Team came 1st place	Team came 2nd place	Team came 3rd place

Original Air Date	Blue Team	Green Team	Pink Team
29 December 2011	Anton du Beke & Russell Grant^{1}	Melanie Sykes & Michelle Collins	Mark Wright & Crissy Rock
22 December 2012	Denise van Outen & Nicky Byrne	Antony Cotton & Chris Fountain^{2}	Nicholas Owen & Kate Garraway

^{1}Team won the jackpot of £20,000 for Sparks and Alzheimer's Society
^{2}Team won the jackpot of £20,000 for The Terrence Higgins Trust, The Myotubular Trust and the British Heart Foundation.
