= Paddy's TV Guide =

- Genre: Comedy
- Created by: Paddy McGuinness
- Written by: Paddy McGuinness; Les Keen
- Directed by: Julia Knowles
- Presented by: Paddy McGuinness
- Starring: Paddy McGuinness; David Plant
- Country of origin: United Kingdom
- Original language: English
- No. of series: 1
- No. of episodes: 8 (list of episodes)

Production
- Executive producers: Michael Kelpie; Phil Mount
- Producer: Kate Edmunds
- Production location: Granada Studios
- Editors: Michael Marden; Matthew Bates
- Running time: 50mins (inc. adverts)
- Production company: ITV Studios

Original release
- Network: Channel 4
- Release: 18 January – 8 March 2013

Paddy's TV Guide is a British television comedy series created, written and presented by Paddy McGuinness, and broadcast on Channel 4 from 18 January to 8 March 2013. Paddy presents the show from Granada Studios in Manchester, where he guides viewers through the good, bad and ugly world of television, including some TV gold from his archives. The show also features David Plant as "Terry".

== Overview ==
Paddy McGuinness uses his 10-foot plasma television and "Paddy Player" to offer a guide through life. It all takes place in a mock-up of his living room, where the comedy sidekick invites an audience to guffaw at a selection of archive TV and video clips, inter-cut with his scripted reactions. David Plant starred as the non speaking Terry

== Episodes ==
No.	Title	Original release date	UK viewers (millions)
1	"Paddy's Guide... to Health and Fitness"	18 January 2013	1.38
Paddy has recorded some rare gems on his 'Paddy player' examining the world of health and fitness, looking at everything from extreme personal training techniques to ways to stay fit into old age.
2	"Paddy's Guide...to Technology"	25 January 2013	Under 1.32
In this show Paddy focuses on technology and looks at everything from some fairly unique science experiments to answering the big questions... such as can we have sex in space?
3	"Paddy's Guide...to Animals"	1 February 2013	Under 1.32
In this edition, Paddy looks at the ways in which we interact with animals on TV - showing people who give in to their animal cravings and others who submit to their animal instincts.
4	"Paddy's Guide...to the Best of British"	8 February 2013	Under 1.23
In this edition Paddy looks at the 'Best of British' - everything from the good old British bobby to one of Scotland's up and coming rock bands. And, as usual, he's trawled the archives to deliver some rarely seen TV gold from the past.
5	"Paddy's Guide...to Love and Romance"	15 February 2013	Under 1.21
In this episode Paddy turns his attention to love and romance in all its guises, from 'husbands of the year' and 'wives of the week' to the man with the largest collection of love dolls.
6	"Paddy's Guide...to Talent"	22 February 2013	Under 1.15
In this show Paddy focuses on 'talent', looking at the underrated talents of Black Lace to the very accomplished Harry and the Potters, all topped off with a 'donk'.
7	"Paddy's Guide...to Families"	1 March 2013	Under 1.19
In the penultimate episode of this series Paddy focuses on families, looking at some of the most unique examples on TV... from naked families to glamorous grandmothers.
8	"Paddy's Guide...to Holidays"	8 March 2013	Under 1.18
Paddy McGuinness hosts the final show in the series that guides viewers through the good, the bad and ugly of the world of television. In this show he focuses on 'holidays', looking at jaunts at home and abroad, with a rare glimpse of what celebrities get up to on their breaks.

== Reception ==
The first episode brought in an average of 1.3 million viewers, but ratings slumped for the rest of the series - not a single other episode was one of Channel 4's top 30 most viewed programmes of the week.

The show was universally panned by critics. Nick Norton of "Off the Box" said "The premise of Paddy's TV Guide, in which the host presents a series of lamentable clips from wretched television shows, all on a set theme each episode, is of little consequence. What is remarkable is the line in the credits that tells us it was "Adapted from an original TV format by Paddy McGuiness and ITV". Which means that either ITV thought the show was too substandard even for the dreck it fills ITV2's schedule with, or Channel 4 actually paid good money to take it off its hands. Either way, shame on Channel 4. As [Stewart] Lee himself might say, to watch it really is the equivalent of letting somebody straddle your face and defecate directly onto your eyeballs."

Shouting at Cows's Pippa Harris said: "Paddy's TV Guide is the kind of curve ball Channel 4 likes to throw in amongst Homeland and documentaries about dolphin murder and the alarming 5 minute thought-provokers like Random Acts. Into the mix will suddenly appear something that seems to have burst through the wall from next door at ITV, offerings like the eejit-whisperers of Tool Academy, the now defunct Love Shaft, and the chat shows they keep trying to give to any female celebrity that can make it through a comedy panel show without clawing Jimmy Carr's face off (remember Charlotte Church's chat show? Anyone?). The rest of it drones on with a smattering of sub-Hill physical sketches and commentary that adds about as much as those dialogue boxes that pop up in front of YouTube clips. I don't think any of this is really Paddy's fault – the problem is this format has been done before and much better; he's out of his depth. If he must be on the goggle-box, someone needs to lead him back towards the neon glow of the gameshow.".

Alex Fletcher of Digital Spy was highly critical of the show: "...occasionally a TV monster does cross my path and bewitches with me its sheer awfulness. Celebrity Wrestling, The Farm, "TOWIE Live", Mark Wright's Hollywood Nights and now joining that list is Paddy's TV Guide. ...Paddy's TV Guide is a weird mix of not particularly amusing video clips and buttock-clenchingly awful editing that squeezes hysterical audience laughter on top of every inoffensive but utterly unamusing comment from the show's host." Fletcher concluded his review by saying: "Bafflingly bad, Paddy will do well to wipe this whole project from his wiki page and pretend it never happened if he knows what's best for him."

Redbrick.me's Rosie Pooley slated the programme as well. She said, "I guarantee that 10 minutes spent on youtube will bring up funnier material than Paddy manages to muster. What Channel 4 has yet to realise is that when Paddy is not swinging out the one-liners with a group of 30 girls lapping up every word, every joke he fluffs up falls flat and makes Paddy’s TV Guide frankly awkward to watch."

== See also ==
- Clive James/Floyd on Television/Tarrant on TV - a similar show made by ITV between 1982 - 2006
