= Drivers Republic =

Digital platform

- Company type: Private
- Industry: Internet
- Founded: Northampton UK (March 2008, closed August 2009)
- Headquarters: Northampton, UK
- Key people: Steve Davies, CEO; Richard Meaden, Editorial Director; Chris Harris, Editorial Director; Jethro Bovingdon, Editorial Director; Neil Carey, Art Director
- Website: drivers-republic.com

Drivers Republic (also referred to as “DR”) was a web-based digital platform comprising a bespoke social community for drivers, an online magazine and a video channel. The title was privately owned and managed by British-based NewMedia Republic Limited. It ceased publication in August 2009 due to differences over the direction taken by its owners and the creative team that produced its magazine and video content. After closing down the original website, the Drivers Republic domain resurfaced in a new site called SkiddMark.

== History ==
Drivers Republic was founded in March 2008 by Steve Davies together with Richard Meaden; a co-founder of Evo (magazine), Jethro Bovingdon; former deputy-Editor of Evo magazine and Chris Harris; former road test editor of Autocar magazine. They were soon joined by Neil Carey, formerly the designer at Evo magazine.

Davies was the only non-journalist of the founding team, being a former management consultancy partner in KPMG Consulting and managing partner in Experian Integrated Marketing. It was during his time at Experian and working together with Hitwise that he gained a profile for advising businesses such as Yahoo, Microsoft and eBay on social networking and internet marketing. Davies provided the initial investment to create and launch Drivers Republic.

Driver's Republic ceased operations on 11 August 2009. Steve Davies explained the shutdown via a blog post on the site: "There has been plenty of speculation on other sites and forums about the reasons why this has occurred, and despite the first impressions that it must have been for financial reasons, nothing could be further from the truth. Thanks to your participation and the generous support of the automotive industry we were in rude health and looking forward to a bumper year, but differences in our vision about future priorities have led to a parting of ways."

== Website and Content ==
The content provided included automotive news, first drives, columns, streaming video, downloadable audio tracks and photos. In addition Drivers Republic publishes digital magazine features (ezines) up to twice a week. These features contained words, pictures and embedded video clips. Following the shutdown of the site, most of this feature content disappeared from its servers.

DR’s magazines were initially published on the Zmags publishing platform, then by Texterity, one of the largest digital publishers in the world. The magazines could be viewed either within the Drivers Republic website or after being downloaded onto home computers or mobile handsets.

DR's social community allows users to create profiles including photos, videos and blogs, join groups, add friends and publish events, similar functionality to that offered by Facebook, with the combination of a MySpace personal page to provide users with a central repository for their news, photos and stories accessible from anywhere on the web.

== Partnerships ==
In July 2008 Drivers Republic formed a partnership with Silverstone Circuits for DR to use the Grand Prix circuit and associated straights to set lap-times and gather performance data.
