= Chris Harris (journalist) =

British automotive journalist

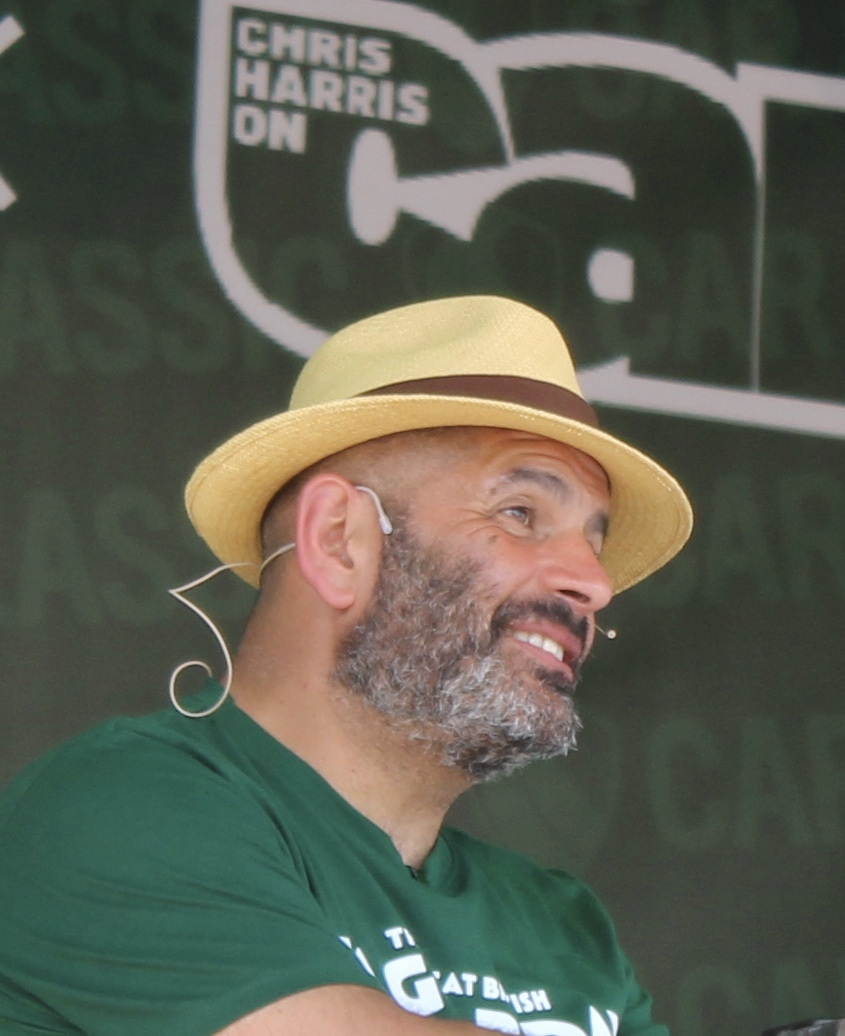
- Harris presenting at Bicester Motion in 2026
- Born: 20 January 1975 (age 51); Beaconsfield, Buckinghamshire, England
- Education: Clifton College
- Occupations: Journalist; racing driver; presenter
- Categorisation: FIA Bronze
- Years active: 2002–present
- Children: 3

Christopher James Harris (born 20 January 1975) is a British automotive journalist, professional racing driver and television presenter. Harris has worked as a reviewer, writer and editor for multiple automotive magazines, including Evo, Autocar and Jalopnik. He has presented numerous television and YouTube series through NBCSN and DRIVE.

From 2017 to 2022, Harris was one of the three main presenters of Top Gear, after previously making regular appearances throughout the twenty-third series in 2016. He has his own YouTube Channel, Chris Harris on Cars, in which he and Neil Carey produce and film their own automotive reviews and content. On 28 June 2016, the Chris Harris on Cars web series was moved from YouTube to the official Top Gear website and in July 2016, Chris Harris on Cars was launched on BBC America.

== Early life and education ==
Harris' father was an accountant and his mother an autocross racer. He was educated at Clifton College, Bristol. He was adopted as a child.

== Journalism ==
Harris began his career in the automotive industry working for Autocar, performing various menial tasks, or, as he himself describes it, "cleaning ashtrays". Eventually, he was promoted to an official road-test editor position within Autocar and gained recognition and credibility as a journalist by writing many automotive reviews, as well as a regular opinion column. At Autocar Harris earned the nickname of "Monkey", a reference to an unseen character "Monkey" Harris in Only Fools and Horses. In 2008, Harris left Autocar magazine to co-found a new web-based digital platform called Drivers Republic. A year later, the enterprise ceased operations. In a statement, Drivers Republic explained the abrupt termination was due to "differences in our vision about future priorities". Immediately after the shutdown, Harris joined Evo as a writer and reviewer, publishing his first article there on 12 October 2009. His features for Evo were published every few months until 21 December 2011, and he resumed writing for Evo regularly on 10 April 2015. In addition, on 6 November 2014, Harris began writing for Jalopnik.

Subsequently, Harris created an opinion and review YouTube series in partnership with /DRIVE. This new series aired weekly (starting in early 2012) on /DRIVE's YouTube channel, called /CHRIS HARRIS ON CARS. Each episode featured a different car, either owned by Harris, or loaned to /DRIVE temporarily by the manufacturer. The series greatly expanded /DRIVE's viewership, with 104 videos together amassing over 3,500,000 views in two years. After two years of hosting automotive videos, Harris left the network in 2014 to create his own YouTube channel. He maintained a positive relationship with /DRIVE, remaining "a close friend of the /DRIVE brand".

In October 2014 Harris started his YouTube channel, Chris Harris on Cars. He partnered with longtime colleague, cameraman and editor, Neil Carey, and still shoots all Chris Harris on Cars (commonly abbreviated "CHOC") independently. Chris Harris on Cars has over 639,000 YouTube subscribers and over 75,000,000 views. Harris also has since partnered with /DRIVE through NBCSN and now appears on that channel, reviewing cars and taking part in automotive-related activities with other hosts, on a regular basis.

== Television ==
In February 2016, Harris officially joined the new cast of Top Gear. Harris served as a recurring presenter for the television show in 2016, but was promoted to a main presenter following the resignation of Chris Evans. From the twenty-fourth series, he presented the series alongside co-hosts Matt LeBlanc and Rory Reid. As of the twenty-seventh series, he hosted the show alongside Freddie Flintoff and Paddy McGuinness.

== Motor racing ==
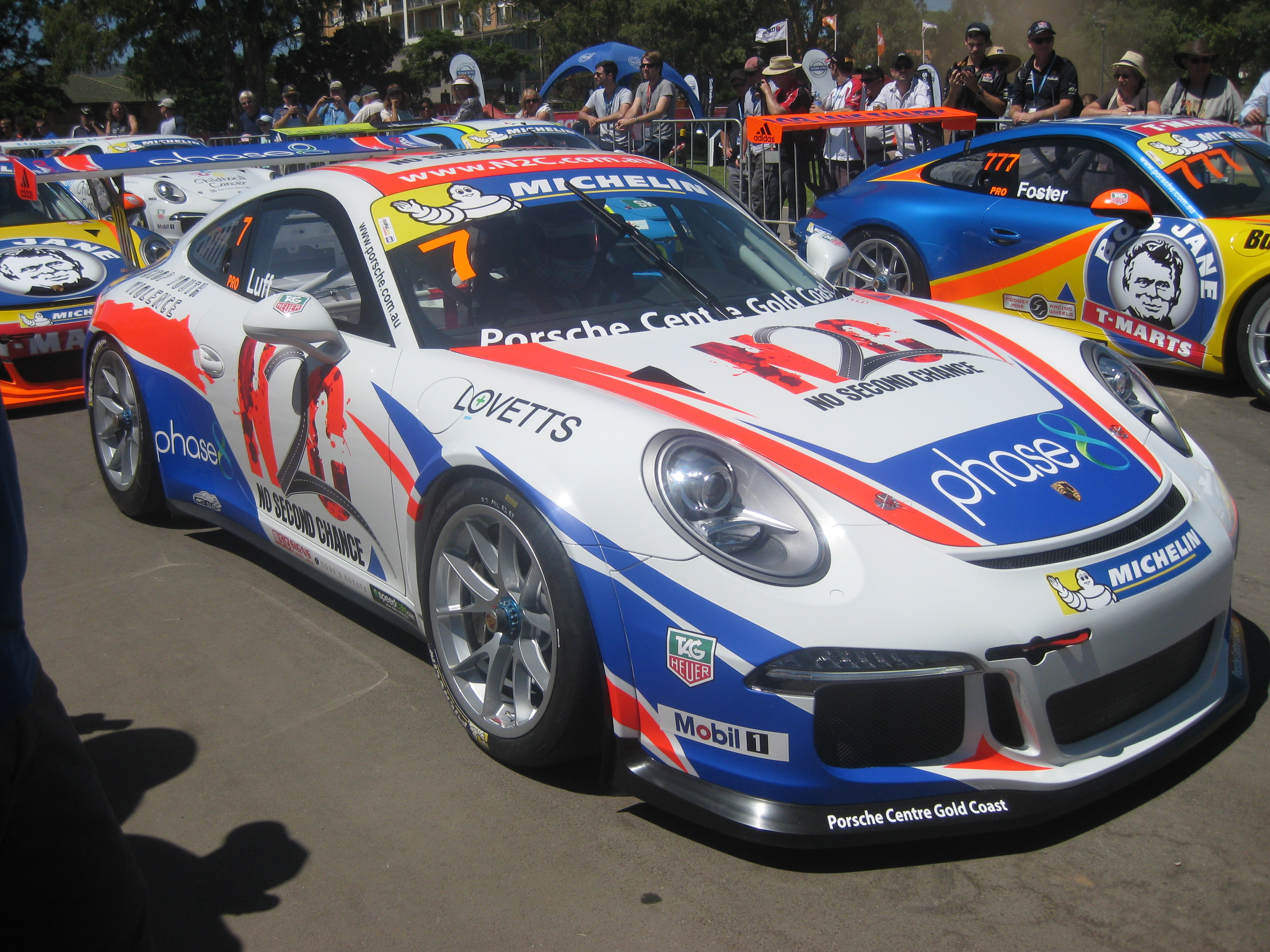
A Porsche 911 Carrera Cup car similar to the one Harris drove

Harris has had an extensive racing career. He won his first race in a Formula Palmer Audi in 2000. Some of the racing cars he has driven include a Porsche 911 Cup, Renault Sport R.S. 01, Aston Martin Vantage GT12, Van Diemen FF1600, Rover SD1 and a Jaguar E-Type. He has also raced in endurance races like the 24 Hours Nürburgring in 2010 and 2015. He was on the Glickenhaus team for 2016, but their car was crashed during a practice session.

Harris often makes videos about the races he is attempting, sometimes teaching basic race techniques and other times simply sharing his experiences. Harris often discuss technical racing terms in his non-racing focused videos. Harris also emphasises the importance of driving and racing safety in many of his videos, especially when teaching techniques like drifting.

=== Britcar 24 Hour results ===
| Year | Team | Co-Drivers | Car | Car No. | Class | Laps | Pos. | Class Pos. |
|---|---|---|---|---|---|---|---|---|
| 2007 | (United Kingdom) Paragon Motorsport | (United Kingdom) Andrew Purdie (United Kingdom) Adrian Slater (United Kingdom) Mark Sumpter | Porsche 996 GT3 Cup | 39 | GTC | 564 | 3rd | 1st |

=== 24 Hours Nürburgring results ===
| Year | Final position | Car | Races | Team |
|---|---|---|---|---|
| 2010 | 13th | Porsche 911 GT3 RS | 1 | Porsche |
| 2015 | DNF | Aston Martin Vantage GT12 | 1 | Aston Martin |
| 2016 | DNF | Glickenhaus P4/5 Competizione | 1 | Glickenhaus |

=== Blancpain GT Series Endurance Amateur Cup results ===
| Year | Team | Car | MNZ (Italy) | SIL (United Kingdom) | LEC (France) | SPA (Belgium) | | | NÜR (Germany) | Points | Position |
| Year | Team | Car | MNZ (Italy) | SIL (United Kingdom) | LEC (France) | 6hrs | 12hrs | 24hrs | NÜR (Germany) | Points | Position |
|---|---|---|---|---|---|---|---|---|---|---|---|
| 2016 | Team Parker Racing | Bentley Continental GT3 | Ret | 40 | 32 | 61 | 53 | 54 | 34 | 48 | 6th |
| 2017 | Garage 59 | McLaren 650S GT3 | | NC | | | | | | | |

== Acquisitions and funding ==
=== Acquisitions ===
While Harris has owned several exotic cars, such as a Ferrari FF, most of the cars Harris reviews are loaned to him by manufacturers. Manufacturers often give automotive journalists press cars, in the hope that a reviewer will give the new car a positive review that boost the car's sales. Harris receives many press cars, sometimes for extended periods of time. Harris has even received cars for up to six months, such as an Audi RS 6. Harris is often characterised as passionate and comical in his reviews of press cars, saying in one review of the Audi RS 6: "life is incomplete without you".

=== Funding ===
Through his Chris Harris on Cars on the Drive YouTube channel, Harris received sponsorship from various brands and YouTube advertising revenue. Eventually, the Drive channel switched partially to Drive+, a paid subscription channel. His current YouTube channel Chris Harris on Cars supports both himself and cameraman/editor Neil Carey. Occasionally, Harris posts videos featuring sponsored content, from brands like Pirelli.

== Filmography ==
Television
| Year | Title | Role | Notes |
|---|---|---|---|
| 2014–2018 | /Drive on NBCSN | Presenter | 22 episodes |
| 2015 | Fifth Gear | Presenter | 1 episode |
| 2016 | APEX: The Story of the Hypercar | Presenter | One-off |
| 2016–2022 | Top Gear | Presenter | 10 series |
| 2016–2017 | Extra Gear | Presenter | 2 series (13 episodes) |
| 2016 | Chris Harris on Cars | Presenter | 1 series (7 episodes) |
| 2018 | Good Morning Britain | Guest | 1 episode |
| 2018–2019 | The One Show | Guest | 2 episodes |
| 2019 | Insert Name Here | Participant | 1 episode |
| 2021, 2023 | Sunday Brunch | Guest | 2 episodes |
| 2024 | Paddy and Chris: Road Tripping | Co-presenter | With Paddy McGuinness; 1 series (three episodes) |
| 2025 | The Weakest Link | Contestant | 1 episode |
| 2026 | Francis Bourgeois and Chris Harris: We Saved a Train | Co-presenter | With Francis Bourgeois; 1 series (eight episodes) |

Video games
| Year | Title | Developer | Role |
|---|---|---|---|
| 2019 | Forza Horizon 4 | Playground Games | Voice over |
