= Insula de 1 milion =

- Genre: Reality television
- Presented by: Cosmin Cernat
- Country of origin: Romania
- Original language: Romanian
- No. of series: 1
- No. of episodes: 31

Production
- Executive producer: Corina Diaconescu
- Production locations: La Romana, Dominican Republic
- Camera setup: Multiple-camera setup

Original release
- Network: Kanal D
- Release: March 16 – June 15, 2024

Related
- Survivor; Expedition Robinson; Exathlon

Insula de 1 milion is a Romanian reality game show based on the international Million Dollar Island format. The season premiered on 16 March 2024 on Kanal D. The show is filmed in Dominican Republic and is presented by Cosmin Cernat.

== Format ==
Following the basic premise of other international versions of the format, it features a group of people who are marooned in an isolated location, where they must provide food, water, fire, and shelter for themselves. The islanders separate themselves into camps. Upon arrival, each contestant is given a numbered bracelet worth 20,000 lei so the 50 bracelets together are worth 1M. Each Episode the Wheel of Power is spun, whoever's number it lands on must nominate 4-10 Islanders or 2 camps to compete in the Arena. Every Islander in the Arena Challenge must put all their bracelets into the pot. The winning Islander will receive all bracelets.The Islanders without bracelets will compete to win their bracelet back from the Arena winner. The islanders without bracelets must receive a bracelet from one of their fellow islanders or be eliminated. The only way to transfer your bracelet is to quit the game. Bracelets can be given to any other.

=== Broadcast ===
The series is scheduled to premiere on March 16, 2024 on Kanal D and will air from Saturday to Sunday at 21:00 p.m. and Monday at 20:00 p.m.

== Contestants ==
The fifty islanders separate themselves into three camps: Sudicii with 28 members, Vesticii with 18 members, and Nordicii with 4 members. On Day 5, Adina switched the camps.

List of Insula de 1 milion contestants
Contestant	Age	From	Occupation	Original Camp	Post-Swaps Camp	Finish	Episode							
Contestant	Age	From	Occupation	Original Camp	Post-Swaps Camp	Finish	Episode	Ciprian Sandu	23	Osica de Sus, Olt	Influencer	Sudicii	Quit	Episode 2
Alexa Matei	24	Bucharest	Quality Inspector	Sudicii	1st eliminated	Episode 3								
Raul Botiz	26	Fântânele, Arad	Working man	Sudicii	2nd eliminated	Episode 4								
Carina Murariu	25	Timișoara, Timiș	Jurist	Sudicii	Sudicii	3rd eliminated	Episode 5							
Diana Gomoi	20	Arad, Arad	Football player	Vesticii	Vesticii	4th eliminated	Episode 6							
Cătălin Spiridon	36	Bucharest	Entrepreneur	Vesticii	Vesticii	5th eliminated	Episode 7							
Alin Calbău	38	Fălticeni, Suceava	Actor	Vesticii	Vesticii	Quit	Episode 8							
Cristian "Micuțu" Angheliuc	45	Rădăuți, Suceava	Nurse	Sudicii	Sudicii	Quit	Episode 9							
Armin Nicoară	28	Timișoara, Timiș	Artist	Sudicii	Sudicii	6th eliminated	Episode 10							
Alex Filip	38	Constanța, Constanța	Kickboxing coach	Sudicii	Sudicii	Quit	Episode 11							
Zoltán "Zoli" Csaba	44	Cluj-Napoca, Cluj	Kids clothing store manager	Sudicii	Sudicii	7th eliminated	Episode 12							
Ileana Florea	34	Craiova, Dolj	Pre-primary school teacher	Nordicii	Nordicii	Quit	Episode 13							
Mihai Oprișenescu	33	Brașov, Brașov	Software engineer	Nordicii	Nordicii	8th eliminated	Episode 14							
Elena Vâja	46	Bucharest	Cleaner	Sudicii	Sudicii	9th eliminated	Episode 15							
Iulian Olaru	42	Bucharest	Chef	Sudicii	Sudicii	Quit	Episode 16							
Camelia Beldiman	44	Brașov, Brașov	Logistics	Vesticii	Vesticii	10th eliminated	Episode 18							
Ștefan Lemnaru	27	Ploiești, Prahova	Content creator	Vesticii	Vesticii	11th eliminated	Episode 19							
Emilia Cercel	27	Drobeta-Turnu Severin, Mehedinți	Swimming instructor	Vesticii	Vesticii	12th eliminated	Episode 20							
Ana Mavru	24	Peretu, Teleorman	Kempo and MMA fighter	Vesticii	Vesticii	Quit	Episode 21							
Giani Toma	24	Afumați, Ilfov	Policeman	Sudicii	Sudicii	13th eliminated	Episode 22							
Cristi Minea	47	Otopeni, Ilfov	Businessman	Vesticii	Vesticii	14th eliminated	Episode 23							
Renata Matei	31	Toplița, Harghita	Beautician	Vesticii	Vesticii	15th eliminated	Episode 24							
Liviu "Tarzy" Dinu	41	Craiova, Dolj	Hip-hop singer	Vesticii	Vesticii	15th eliminated	Episode 24							
Marius Gabriel	29	Călărași, Călărași	Commercial director and barman	Vesticii	Vesticii	15th eliminated	Episode 24							
Mădălina Lupu	23	Timișoara, Timiș	Make-up sales agent	Sudicii	Sudicii	15th eliminated	Episode 24							
Dumitru Opincă	62	Iași, Iași	Retired	Sudicii	Sudicii	15th eliminated	Episode 24							
Adina Miuleasa	24	Strehaia, Mehedinți	Entrepreneur	Sudicii	Nordicii	15th eliminated	Episode 24							
Dragoș Stanciu	31	Bucharest	Real estate agent and fitness model	Sudicii	Sudicii	21st eliminated	Episode 24							
Maria But	25	Lovrin, Timiș	Kinetotherapist	Sudicii	Sudicii	22nd eliminated	Episode 25							
Alexandru "Blondu" Șipoș	25	Arad, Arad	Dispatcher	Sudicii	Sudicii	23rd eliminated	Episode 26							
Bianca Pescar	21	Cluj-Napoca, Cluj	Student	Sudicii	Sudicii	24th eliminated	Episode 27							
Isabela Sandu	29	Bucharest	Online beauty shop owner	Sudicii	Sudicii	25th eliminated	Episode 29							
Alina Petrea	35	Iași, Iași	Accountant	Sudicii	Sudicii	Medically evacuated	Episode 30							
Angela Moga	60	Târgu-Mures, Mureș	Sales agent	Sudicii	Sudicii	26th eliminated	Episode 30							
Alexandra Maticiuc	19	Brașov, Brașov	Physical therapy student	Sudicii	Sudicii	26th eliminated	Episode 30							
Tudor Andronic	32	Sibiu, Sibiu	Actor	Vesticii	Vesticii									
Florica "Flori" Boboi	38	Negrești-Oaș, Satu Mare	Chef	Sudicii	Sudicii									
Liviu Cîrdei	33	Suceava, Suceava	Photographer	Vesticii	Vesticii									
Szilárd Deak	43	Sfântu Gheorghe, Covasna	Carpenter	Sudicii	Sudicii									
Denis Gavrilovici	19	Suceava, Suceava	Web consultant	Vesticii	Vesticii									
Alex Enciu	25	Bucharest	Student	Vesticii	Vesticii									
Argentina Korobian	49	Toaca, Mureș	Grocery store owner	Sudicii	Sudicii									
Nicoleta Malanca	25	Satu Mare, Satu Mare	Real estate agent	Nordicii	Vesticii									
Georgiana Moisa	28	Arad, Arad	Truck driver	Sudicii	Sudicii									
Sorin Sîntimbrean	27	Blaj, Alba	Bodyguard	Nordicii	Sudicii									
Ionuț "Jaguaru" Sugacevschi	33	Galați, Galați	MMA Fighter	Sudicii	Sudicii	Ejected	Episode 18							
Szidónia "Sindy" Szász	29	Brașov, Brașov	Massage technician	Sudicii	Sudicii									
Alexandru Variu	33	Bucharest	Hairstylist	Sudicii	Sudicii									
Maria-Magdalena Vlădaia	26	Bucharest	Actress and teacher	Vesticii	Vesticii									
Andrei Zăgan	33	Botoșani, Botoșani	Sales consultant	Vesticii	Vesticii									

== Game history ==
=== Bracelet Numbers ===
Each Bracelet has a corresponding number on the Wheel of Power. Whoever's number it lands on gains the ability to nominate multiple people or camps to be eliminate

Challenge winners and eliminations by episode
Episode(s)		Picked by Wheel	Arena Challenge			Survival Challenge		Eliminated		
Nr.	Date	Picked by Wheel	Nominated	Winner	Pot	Winner(s)	Loser(s)	Player	Transferred Bracelet To	New total
1	March 16, 2024	Alin	Filip, Jaguaru, Sorin, Szilárd	Szilárd	80.000 lei	Sorin, Jaguaru	Filip	—N/a		
2	March 17, 2024	Tarzy	Adina, Alexa, Alexandra, Sindy	Alexandra	80.000 lei	Adina, Sindy	Alexa	Ciprian	Filip	20.000 lei
3	March 18, 2024	Andrei	Blondu, Carina, Maria, Raul	Blondu	80.000 lei	Carina, Maria	Raul	Alexa	—N/a	
4	March 23, 2024	Bianca	Jaguaru, Dragoș, Carina, Flori	Flori	80.000 lei	Jaguaru, Dragoș	Carina	Raul	—N/a	
5	March 24, 2024	Lemnaru	Lemnaru, Diana, Alin, Blondu	Lemnaru	100.000 lei	Blondu, Alin	Diana	Carina	—N/a	
6	March 25, 2024	Mădălina	Tudor, Cătălin, Alin, Marius	Tudor	80.000 lei	Alin, Marius	Cătălin	Diana	—N/a	
7	March 30, 2024	Andrei	Andrei, Cristi, Renata, Flori	Cristi	100.000 lei	Andrei, Flori	Renata	Cătălin	—N/a	
8	March 31, 2024	Bianca	Szilárd, Dragoș, Filip, Jaguaru	Szilárd	100.000 lei	Dragoș, Jaguaru	Filip	Alin	Renata	20.000 lei
9	April 1, 2024	Flori	Mihai, Giani, Tarzy, Armin	Mihai	80.000 lei	Giani, Tarzy	Armin	Micuțu	Filip	20.000 lei
10	April 6, 2024	Angela	Isabela, Argentina, Vlădaia, Nicoleta	Isabela	80.000 lei	Argentina; Vlădaia	Nicoleta	Armin	—N/a	
11	April 7, 2024	Cristi	Denis, Variu; Iulian, Zoli	Variu	80.000 lei	Iulian; Denis	Zoli	Filip	Nicoleta	20.000 lei
12	April 8, 2024	Adina	Adina, Isabela; Flori, Blondu	Blondu	140.000 lei	Flori; Adina	Isabela	Zoli	—N/a	
13	April 13, 2024	Szilárd	Szilárd, Mihai; Liviu, Denis	Szilárd	140.000 lei	Liviu; Denis	Mihai	Ileana	Isabela	20.000 lei
14	April 14, 2024	Alina	Alina, Emilia; Elena, Camelia	Alina	80.000 lei	Camelia; Emilia	Elena	Mihai	—N/a	
15	April 15, 2024	Ana	Dumitru, Dragos; Sorin, Jaguaru	Jaguaru	80.000 lei	Dragos; Sorin	Dumitru	Elena	—N/a	
16	April 20, 2024	Szilárd; Maria	Orange Team:Szilárd; Dragoș, Iulian; Tudor, Tarzy, Alex; Renata, Alexandra; Flori, Mădălina Green Team:Maria; Argentina, Georgiana; Ana, Blondu; Variu, Andrei, Cristi; Lemnaru, Liviu	Green Team	Reward: Grătar(BBQ)	—N/a		Iulian	Dumitru	20.000 lei
17	April 21, 2024	Nicoleta	Nicoleta, Adina; Bianca, Camelia	Bianca; Reward:Bianca; Renata, Vlădaia; Tudor, Marius	80.000 lei Shower	Nicoleta; Adina	Camelia	—N/a		
18	April 22, 2024	Alina	Sorin, Alex; Tudor, Lemnaru	Tudor	120.000 lei	Alex; Sorin	Lemnaru	Camelia	—N/a	
19	April 27, 2024	Flori	Maria, Georgiana; Vlădaia, Emilia	Maria	80.000 lei	Georgiana; Vlădaia	Emilia	Lemnaru	—N/a	
20	April 28, 2024	Variu	Jaguaru, Sorin; Cristi, Marius	Cristi	120.000 lei	Sorin; Jaguaru	Marius	Emilia	—N/a	
21	April 29, 2024	Nicoleta	Variu, Sorin; Giani, Denis	Variu	100.000 lei	Sorin; Denis	Giani	Ana	Marius	20.000 lei
22	May 4, 2024	Cristi	Cristi, Alex; Flori, Blondu	Alex	200.000 lei	Flori; Blondu	Cristi	Giani	—N/a	
23	May 5, 2024	Tarzy	Sorin, Dragoș; Alexandra, Maria	Alexandra	120.000 lei	Sorin; Maria	Dragoș	Cristi	—N/a	
24	May 6, 2024	Maria	Adina, Denis, Tarzy; Nicoleta, Sindy, Liviu; Andrei, Vlădaia; Renata Marius; Dumitru, Mădălina	Denis; Sindy; Liviu	240.000 lei	Andrei; Nicoleta; Vlădaia	Tarzy, Mădălina; Adina, Dumitru; Marius, Renata	Dragoș	—N/a	
25	May 11, 2024	Alex	Maria, Alexandra; Sorin, Flori	Sorin	lei	Alexandra; Flori	Maria	Maria	—N/a	
26	May 12, 2024	Tudor	Jaguaru, Blondu; Sorin, Variu	Sorin	lei	Jaguaru; Variu	Blondu	Blondu	—N/a	
27	May 13, 2024	Variu	Variu, Bianca; Denis, Nicoleta	Variu	lei	Nicoleta; Denis	Bianca	Bianca	—N/a	
28	May 18, 2024	Flori; Alina	Green Team:Flori; Szilárd, Sindy; Tudor, Variu Andrei, Nicoleta; Georgiana; Orange Team:Alina; Argentina; Jaguaru, Alex; Liviu, Denis; Isabela; Alexandra	Green Team	Reward: Pan de Coco	—N/a				
29	May 19, 2024	Liviu	Sindy, Argentina; Alina, Isabela	Alina	lei	Sindy; Argentina	Isabela	Isabela	—N/a	
30	May 26, 2024	Sindy	Alexandra, Georgiana; Nicoleta, Angela	Georgiana	lei	Nicoleta	Alexandra; Angela	Alina; Angela; Alexandra	Flori	100.000 lei
31	May 27, 2024	Sindy								
