= Paddy McGuinness =

English actor, comedian and television presenter (born 1973)

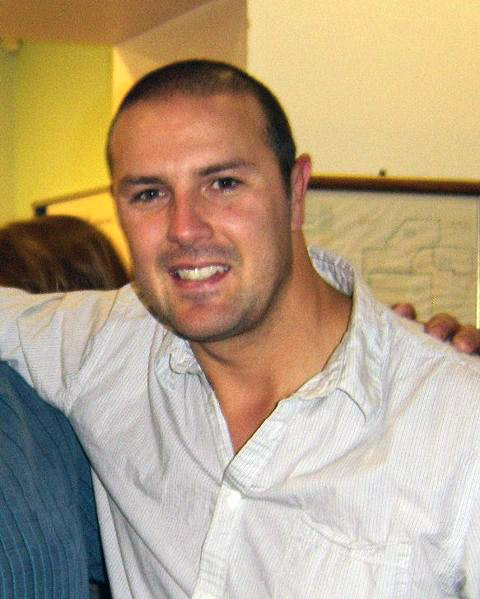
- McGuinness in 2008
- Born: Patrick Joseph McGuinness; 14 August 1973 (age 53); Farnworth, Lancashire, England
- Occupations: Comedian; actor; writer; television presenter
- Years active: 1995–present
- Spouse: Christine Martin (m. 2011; div. 2024)
- Children: 3

Patrick Joseph McGuinness (born 14 August 1973) is an English comedian, actor, writer, and television presenter. He rose to fame with the help of fellow comedian Peter Kay, who invited him to appear on the television comedy series That Peter Kay Thing (2000), and the sitcoms Phoenix Nights (2000–2001) and Max and Paddy's Road to Nowhere (2004). McGuinness went on to present various television shows, including Take Me Out (2010–2019), 71 Degrees North (2011), Paddy's TV Guide (2013), Top Gear (2019–2022), I Can See Your Voice (2021–2022), Question of Sport (2021–2023) and Tempting Fortune (2023–2025).

McGuinness has written and performed four stand-up comedy tours: The Dark Side Tour (2006), Plus You! Tour (2008), The Saturday Night Live Tour (2011), and Daddy McGuinness (2015–2016).

== Early life and education ==
McGuinness was born in Farnworth, Lancashire. His mother Patricia worked as a cleaner and barmaid. He attended Mount St Joseph High School, where he formed a close friendship with fellow comedian Peter Kay. For seven years, he worked at Horwich Leisure Centre as a manager, lifeguard and latterly a fitness instructor.

== Television ==
McGuinness made his television debut in 1995 as a contestant on the show God's Gift.

His breakthrough came in 2001 as bouncer Paddy O'Shea in the Channel 4 comedy series Phoenix Nights and spin-off Max and Paddy's Road to Nowhere. He had previously featured in That Peter Kay Thing.

On 15 May 2006, McGuinness hosted Inside Wayne Rooney on Sky 1, a programme where he completed different tasks to see the difference between him and the professional footballer.

McGuinness' other television work includes his own Chuck Stryker: The Unknown Stuntman on E4 which he wrote and starred in opposite Jonathan Wrather and a few other familiar faces.

McGuinness presented Stars in Their Cars, a series for the Travel Channel in 2016.

He also appeared in the second series of the Sky 1 show The Match.

=== Rory and Paddy ===
First airing on 13 August 2008, McGuinness co-starred in a television series with British comedian Rory McGrath, broadcast on Channel 5, Rory and Paddy's Great British Adventure. This was a four-part series in which McGuinness and McGrath embark on a nationwide road-trip, "on a mission to explore Britain's sporting heritage by probing the hidden life of its towns and villages". The series focuses on arcane sports, such as cheese rolling. A second series began on 20 September 2010 on Channel 5.

=== Channel 4 ===
In 2006, McGuinness guest hosted The Paul O'Grady Show. He presented the entertainment series Hotel GB in 2012. In 2013 McGuinness presented Paddy's TV Guide. In 2014 McGuinness narrated the three-part charity series Stars at Your Service for Channel 4. In 2015, he presented the Channel 4 daytime game show series Benchmark for 30 episodes as well as five celebrity editions.

From April 2023, he hosted new reality show Tempting Fortune, which was renewed for a second series in 2024.

In August 2023, Channel 4 announced McGuinness as presenter for Don't Look Down in aid of Stand Up to Cancer.

=== ITV ===
In 2007, McGuinness presented Raiders of the Lost Archive.

From 2010 until 2019, McGuinness hosted the ITV dating show Take Me Out. McGuinness hosted over 100 episodes in eleven series and gained over four million viewers. Take Me Out established him as a prime-time host and popularised catchphrases such as "no likey, no lighty!"

He was a guest presenter of This Morning in 2010, a role to which he returned in 2011. He hosted the second series of 71 Degrees North with Charlotte Jackson in 2011. In 2012, he hosted Paddy's Show and Telly. The show returned for a second special in 2013. McGuinness hosted the comedy panel show Mad Mad World for seven episodes in 2012. Two episodes were recorded but never aired. McGuinness was one of the presenters of Christmas telethon Text Santa. In 2012 and 2013, McGuinness co-hosted one hour of the telethon with Christine Bleakley, although Alesha Dixon was his co-presenter for the 2014 appeal.

In 2013, McGuinness co-presented talent show series Your Face Sounds Familiar with Alesha Dixon. In 2014, McGuinness co-hosted the Saturday night game show Amazing Greys alongside Angela Rippon. In 2015, he regularly starred in the ITV2 comedy show The Keith Lemon Sketch Show.

McGuinness played the role of policeman Ian in the ITV comedy The Delivery Man, beginning in April 2015. In 2015, McGuinness guest starred in six episodes of Coronation Street, playing the role of Dougie Ryan. The episodes were shown in August. On Christmas Eve in 2015 he presented one-off ITV special, The ABBA Christmas Party

He starred in the ITV comedy series The Keith & Paddy Picture Show with Keith Lemon in 2017. It returned for a second series in April 2018. In January 2018, McGuinness presented The Greatest TV Moments of All Time, a one-off special for ITV. McGuinness has appeared as a panellist on numerous episodes of Keith Lemon's shows Celebrity Juice and Through the Keyhole. In 2019, he replaced Fearne Cotton as team captain on the former show. He left after one series due to other work commitments.

=== BBC ===
Paddy co-presented two episodes of Even Better Than the Real Thing on BBC One. McGuinness presented Paddy McGuinness' Sport Relief Warm-Up and was one of the presenters for the 2018 Sport Relief show. He provided the voiceover for the BBC series Ready or Not in 2018.

In 2018, McGuinness began co-presenting series 27 of Top Gear.

In 2020, it was announced that McGuinness and fellow Top Gear presenter Freddie Flintoff would host Total Wipeout: Freddie and Paddy Takeover, a six episode best of series, featuring the presenters narrating classic episodes of Total Wipeout. The first episode aired on 8 August 2020 and received negative reviews.

In 2021, McGuinness replaced Sue Barker as host of BBC game show Question of Sport for its 51st series. In 2024 he replaced Gregg Wallace as host for Inside the Factory.

== Radio ==
McGuinness had his own radio show on Bauer City 1 stations across the North of England on Sunday mornings from 9 am until 12 noon. His show ran from 2014 until 2017.

In June 2024, McGuinness took over Michael Ball's 11am BBC Radio 2 show.

== Tours ==
In 2005 and 2006, McGuinness toured the UK, performing 108 shows. Paddy McGuinness: The Dark Side Tour was his first solo stand-up tour. While on tour, he reprised his role of Lord Love Rocket from the award-winning comedy Phoenix Nights. From 21 August to 11 December 2008, McGuinness was involved in a second tour, called the Paddy McGuinness Plus You! Live, which included 76 dates around the UK and Ireland. The Plus You! Tour featured McGuinness, along with other variety acts that were chosen by him, through a competition that ran on his official website, hence the title of Plus You!

In 2011, McGuinness went on his third stand-up tour, called Paddy McGuinness: Saturday Night Live Tour. In January 2015, he announced that he would be touring across 2015 and 2016 with the "Daddy McGuinness" tour throughout the UK. The tour opened in Scunthorpe on 28 September 2015 and the final date was at the Hammersmith Apollo in London on 27 February 2016.

In 2023, McGuinness announced Nearly There; a 40-date UK tour announced for 2024–2025.

== Books ==
In 2010, McGuinness released My Guide to the North: (and Scotland & Wales, oh, and less important places i.e. the South). In 2021 McGuinness released his autobiography, My Lifey.

== Other work ==
In 2010, McGuinness starred in the adult pantomime Panto's on Strike at the Opera House, Manchester with Robbie Williams and Jonathan Wilkes. In 2012, he starred in a UK TV advertising campaign for Victor Chandler, a British bookmaker. In 2010, 2012, 2014, 2016 and 2018, McGuinness took part in the charity football match Soccer Aid, which raises money for Unicef. The match is aired live on ITV.

In 2012, McGuinness played Gary in Keith Lemon: The Film. In 2013, McGuinness joined Pizza Hut as their brand ambassador.

In 2017, McGuinness joined Jackpot Joy as their brand ambassador, taking over from Barbara Windsor.

== Personal life ==
McGuinness married English model and television personality Christine Martin on 4 June 2011 at Thornton Manor in Thornton Hough, Wirral, Merseyside. The couple have a twin girl and boy and a younger daughter. In 2017, the family moved from their former £2.1 million home to a modern mansion in Prestbury, Cheshire.

All three of the McGuinness children are autistic, as is their mother. In 2021, they made a BBC documentary Paddy and Christine McGuinness: Our Family and Autism. In June 2018, McGuinness revealed that he had been diagnosed with arthritis several years prior, at the age of 44. In 2022, McGuinness and his wife separated after 11 years of marriage.

His brother, Tony Leonard, appeared in Max and Paddy's Road to Nowhere as Raymond the Bastard's henchman, as a teammate of Paddy's on The F Word, and as a featured audience member on Celebrity Juice.

In August 2024, McGuinness was the subject of the BBC genealogy programme Who Do You Think You Are?, which revealed that his paternal great-great-grandparents, Mark McGuinness and Winifred Molloy, were from Ballina, County Mayo in Ireland. His paternal grandfather William, who was also born in Bolton, served in the King's Own Royal Regiment (Lancaster) and fought in several battles in the Second Boer War, including the Battle of Spion Kop and the Battle of the Tugela Heights in 1900.

McGuinness is a supporter of his local team Bolton Wanderers.

In November 2024, McGuinness raised more than £9 million for Children in Need's 2024 Appeal, by riding a customised 1970s children's Raleigh Chopper bike, over five days, from Wrexham to Glasgow, a distance of almost 300 miles (480 km).

== Stand-up tours ==
Year	Title	Notes
2006	The Dark Side	
2008	Plus You!	
2015–2016	Up Close and Personal with Daddy McGuinness	
2024–2025	Nearly There	
2027-2028	Blast From The Past	

=== DVD releases ===
Title	Released	Notes
Live	6 November 2006	Live at Blackpool's Opera House Theatre
Plus You! Live	17 November 2008	Live at Glasgow's Pavilion Theatre
Saturday Night Live Tour 2011	21 November 2011	Live at Manchester's Arena

== Filmography ==
=== Television ===
Year	Title	Role	Notes
1998	Comedy Lab	Pump Attendant Terry	Episode: The Services
2000	Peter Kay: Live at the Top of the Tower	Guest appearance	
2000	That Peter Kay Thing	Patrick "Paddy" O'Shea	Episode: "In the Club"
2001–2002	Phoenix Nights	Patrick "Paddy" O'Shea	2 series
2004	Max & Paddy's Road to Nowhere	Patrick "Paddy" O'Shea	1 series
2005	Comic Relief: Red Nose Night Live 05	Patrick "Paddy" O'Shea	
2005	Max & Paddy's The Power of Two	Patrick "Paddy" O'Shea	
2006	Sport Relief 2006	Patrick "Paddy" O'Shea	
2006	Inside Wayne Rooney	Presenter	1 episode
2006	The New Paul O'Grady Show	Guest presenter	1 episode
2007	Raiders of the Lost Archive	Presenter	
2008	Keith Lemon's Very Brilliant World Tour	Cousin Gary	1 series
2008–2010	Rory and Paddy's Great British Adventure	Co-presenter	2 series
2010–2019	Take Me Out	Presenter	11 series
2010–2011, 2024	This Morning	Stand-in presenter	9 episodes
2011	71 Degrees North	Co-presenter	1 series
2011–2012	Paddy's Show & Telly	Presenter	2 specials
2012	Mad Mad World	Presenter	1 series
2012	Hotel GB	Presenter	1 series
2012–2014	The Greatest Footie Ads...Ever	Presenter	2 specials
2012–2015	Text Santa	Co-presenter	4 episodes
2013	The Security Men	PC Clarke	One-off episode
2013	Paddy's TV Guide	Presenter	1 series
2013	Your Face Sounds Familiar	Co-presenter	1 series
2014	Amazing Greys	Co-presenter	1 series
2014	Stars at Your Service for SU2C	Narrator	
2015	The Delivery Man	Ian	1 series
2015	Benchmark	Presenter	1 series
2015	Coronation Street	Dougie Ryan	Guest role; 6 episodes
2015	Keith Lemon's Back T'Future Tribute	Biff Tannen	One-off TV special
2015	The Abba Christmas Party	Presenter	One-off TV special
2015–2016	The Keith Lemon Sketch Show	Regular contributor	2 series
2016	Stars in Their Cars	Presenter	1 series
2017	Even Better Than the Real Thing	Presenter	2 specials
2017–2018	The Keith and Paddy Picture Show	Co-presenter	2 series
2018	The Greatest TV Moments of All Time	Presenter	One-off TV special
2018	Paddy McGuinness' Sport Relief Warm-Up	Presenter	One-off
2018	Ready or Not	Voiceover	1 series
2018–2020	Sport Relief	Co-presenter	
2019	Celebrity Juice	Team Captain	Series 21
2019–2022	Top Gear	Presenter	7 Series
2019–2022	Catchpoint	Presenter	4 series
2019–2024	Comic Relief	Co-presenter	
2020	The Big Night In	Co-presenter	
2020	Daisy & Ollie	Uncle Tommy	1 episode
2020	Total Wipeout: Freddie and Paddy Takeover	Co-narrator	6 episodes
2020	The Big New Year's In	Presenter	1 episode
2021–2022	I Can See Your Voice	Presenter	2 Series
2021–2023	Question of Sport	Presenter	2 Series
2022	Shopping with Keith Lemon	Guest	Series 3 episode 8
2023	The Great Stand Up to Cancer Bake Off	Contestant	Channel 4
2023	Paddy and Christine McGuinness: Our Family and Autism	Himself	With wife Christine McGuinness
2023	Don't Look Down	Presenter	In aid of Stand Up to Cancer
2023–present	Tempting Fortune	Presenter	Challenge show
2024	Inside the Factory	Presenter	Replacing Gregg Wallace
2024	Who Do You Think You Are?	Himself	1 episode
2024	Paddy And Chris: Road Tripping	Co-presenter	With Chris Harris
2025	Mandy	Himself	cameo

=== Film ===
Year	Title	Role	Notes
2012	Keith Lemon: The Film	Gary	

=== Web ===
Year	Title	Role	Notes
2026	Sidemen Sunday: Sidemen Youtuber Party Bus	Himself	

== Awards and nominations ==
Year	Award	Category	Result	Ref.
2022	National Television Awards	Authored Documentary	Nominated	
2022	National Television Awards	TV Presenter	Nominated	
