= Monteverdi Safari =

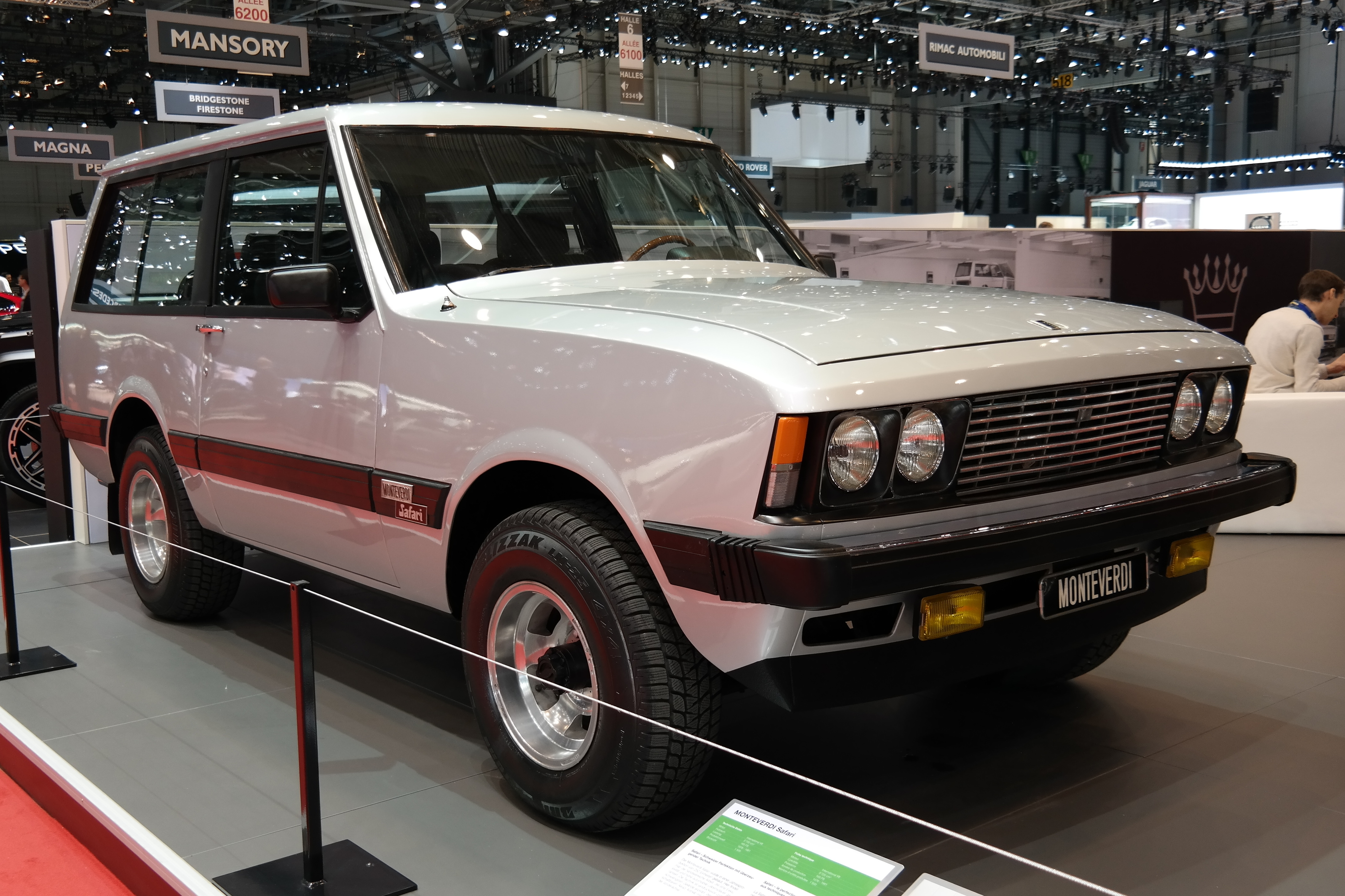

Overview
- Manufacturer: Monteverdi
- Also called: Monteverdi Sahara
- Production: 1976–1982
- Assembly: Switzerland: Binningen
- Designer: Carrozzeria Fissore

Body and chassis
- Class: Full-size luxury SUV
- Body style: 3-door SUV
- Layout: Front engine, four-wheel-drive
- Related: International Scout

Powertrain
- Engine: 5,210 cc 318 LA V8 (Chrysler); 5,654 cc SV-345 V8 (IH); 7,206 cc 440 RB V8 (Chrysler)
- Transmission: 3-speed automatic

Dimensions
- Wheelbase: 2,540 mm (100.0 in)
- Length: 4,510 mm (177.6 in)
- Width: 1,800 mm (70.9 in)
- Height: 1,760 mm (69.3 in)
- Curb weight: 2,120 kg (4,674 lb); 54%:46%

The Monteverdi Safari is a Swiss luxury SUV first presented by Peter Monteverdi in 1976. It entered into production in 1977. Production came to an end in 1982, after production of the International Scout (upon which the Safari was based and with which it shared many parts) came to an end. There was also a lower-priced version called the Sahara, which retained the Scout's original bodywork with some modifications.

== History ==
Having previously built only high end sports cars, the Safari was Monteverdi's first attempt at marketing an SUV. It was based on the International Scout, with a new body built by Fissore, with whom Monteverdi had a long standing relationship, as well as a more luxurious interior and available Chrysler V8 engines. There were relatively few luxury SUVs offered in Europe at this time, with the Safari's main competitors being the Range Rover, as well as low volume models from customizers like the Felber Oasis, which was also based on an International Scout. In its home country of Switzerland, the Safari's 1977 domestic market price of CHF 39,000 was CHF 5,000 higher than that of the Range Rover. While the Safari's sales volumes were dwarfed by those of the Range Rover, they were high compared to the company's other models such as the High Speed. Production estimates for the Safari vary, with some sources saying that the Safari sold in triple digit numbers, making it Monteverdi's all time best selling model.

As it was positioned to compete with the Range Rover, the Safari featured a number of luxury features, some of which were unique to the Safari while others were optional extras from the Scout it was based on. These include air conditioning, new seats with optional leather upholstery (cloth or faux leather as standard), an automatic transmission, switchable four-wheel drive, electric windows, power locks, Monteverdi steering wheel, redesigned center console and dashboard, and a new gauge cluster. Also available as optional extras were a plexiglas partition, television set, refrigerator, cable-winch and manual or electric sunroof. The automatic transmission and switchable 4WD gave the Safari an edge over the Range Rover, which at the time was only offered with a manual transmission and full time 4WD.

Standard equipment was originally a Chrysler 5.2 litre V-8 engine delivering a claimed 152 PS (112 kW; 150 hp) at 4,000 rpm and 346 N⋅m (255 lb⋅ft) of torque. The torque and added displacement gave it a significant performance advantage over the 3.5 litre-engine Range Rover of the time. A 5.7 litre 165 PS (121 kW; 163 hp) International Harvester V8 engine was also offered, and Monteverdi claimed that the drivetrain components were also engineered to be able to accommodate Chrysler’s 7.2 litre 305 PS (224 kW; 301 hp) V8 unit. In its 5.2 litre form, the vehicle achieved a top speed of 165.1 km/h (102.6 mph) and took 13.1 seconds to reach 100 km/h (62 mph) from a standing start. The large engine and heavy weight led to an overall fuel consumption figure of 25.1 L/100 km (11.3 mpg_{‑imp}; 9.4 mpg_{‑US}) achieved during the 1977 road test from which these performance figures are taken. The 7.2 litre version has a claimed top speed of 200 km/h (124 mph), and the stated fuel consumption figures were more than 50 percent higher than for the 5.7 litre version.

The Safari was only sold as a 2-door SUV, but a 4-door version was built as a prototype. The 4-door prototype did not enter production, but it did precede a short collaboration between Monteverdi and Land Rover starting in 1980 that saw Monteverdi converting 2-door Range Rovers into 4-doors and selling them through Land Rover dealerships. This collaboration only lasted until 1982 though, after Land Rover introduced an official 4-door Range Rover model in 1981.

== Sahara ==
Monteverdi also sold a lower priced entry level alternative to the Safari called the Sahara, which retained most of the Scout's original bodywork, with some modifications such as the quad headlights, grille, bumpers, and badging. The interior of the Sahara offered many of the same options as the Safari, with a handful of features missing, and the cars typically being less optioned. Engine options for the Sahara included the standard 5.7-litre IH V8, as well as a Nissan SD33 diesel engine, although only one diesel example is thought to have been made. Its estimated that only around 30 Saharas were made, making it much less popular than the Safari.

== Gallery ==
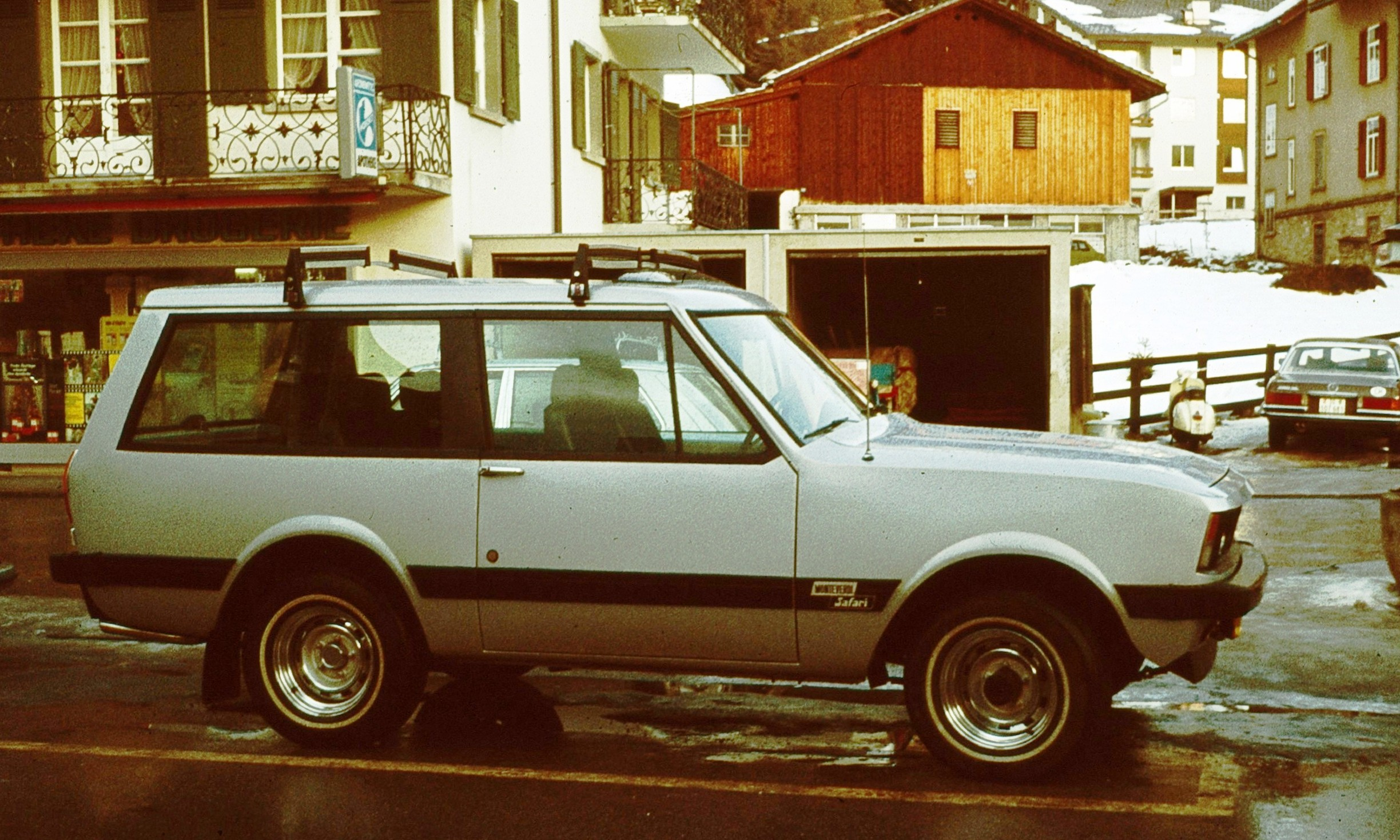
Monteverdi Safari at a Swiss ski resort in 1978

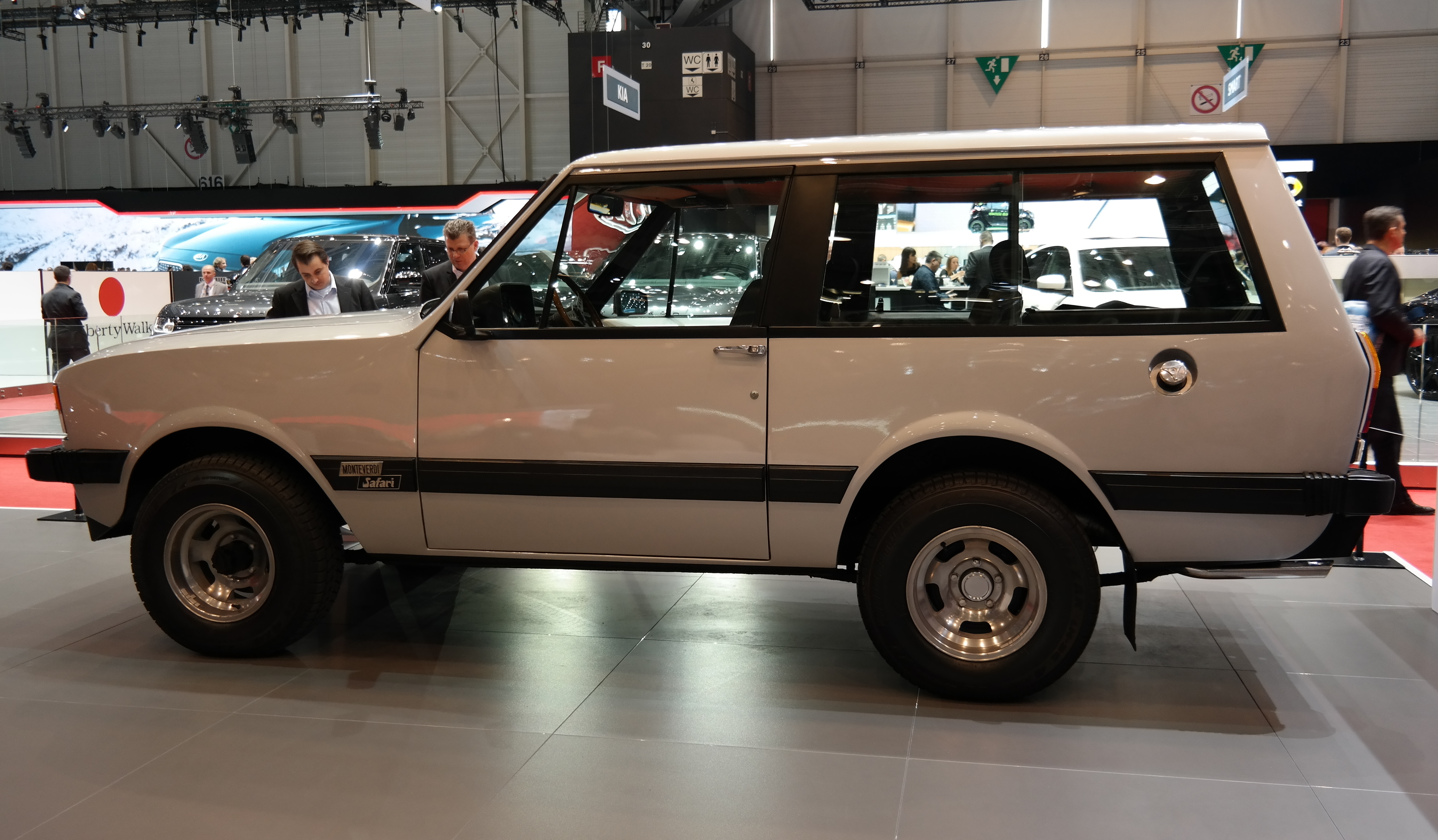
Monteverdi Safari at the 2017 Geneva Motor Show

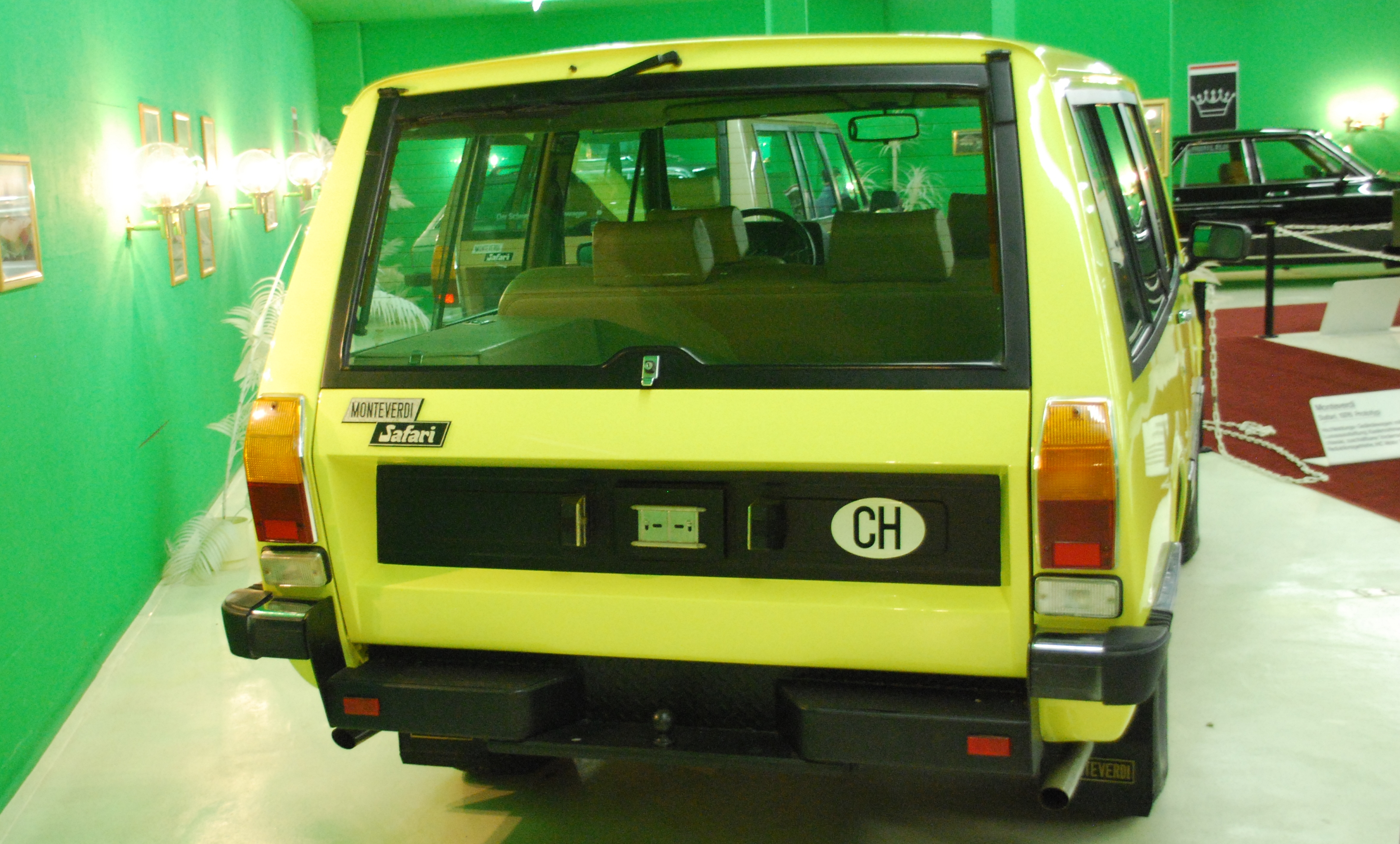
Rear section of the Safari: The taillights come from the Peugeot 504 Break.

Monteverdi Safari 4-door prototype

1978 Monteverdi Sahara

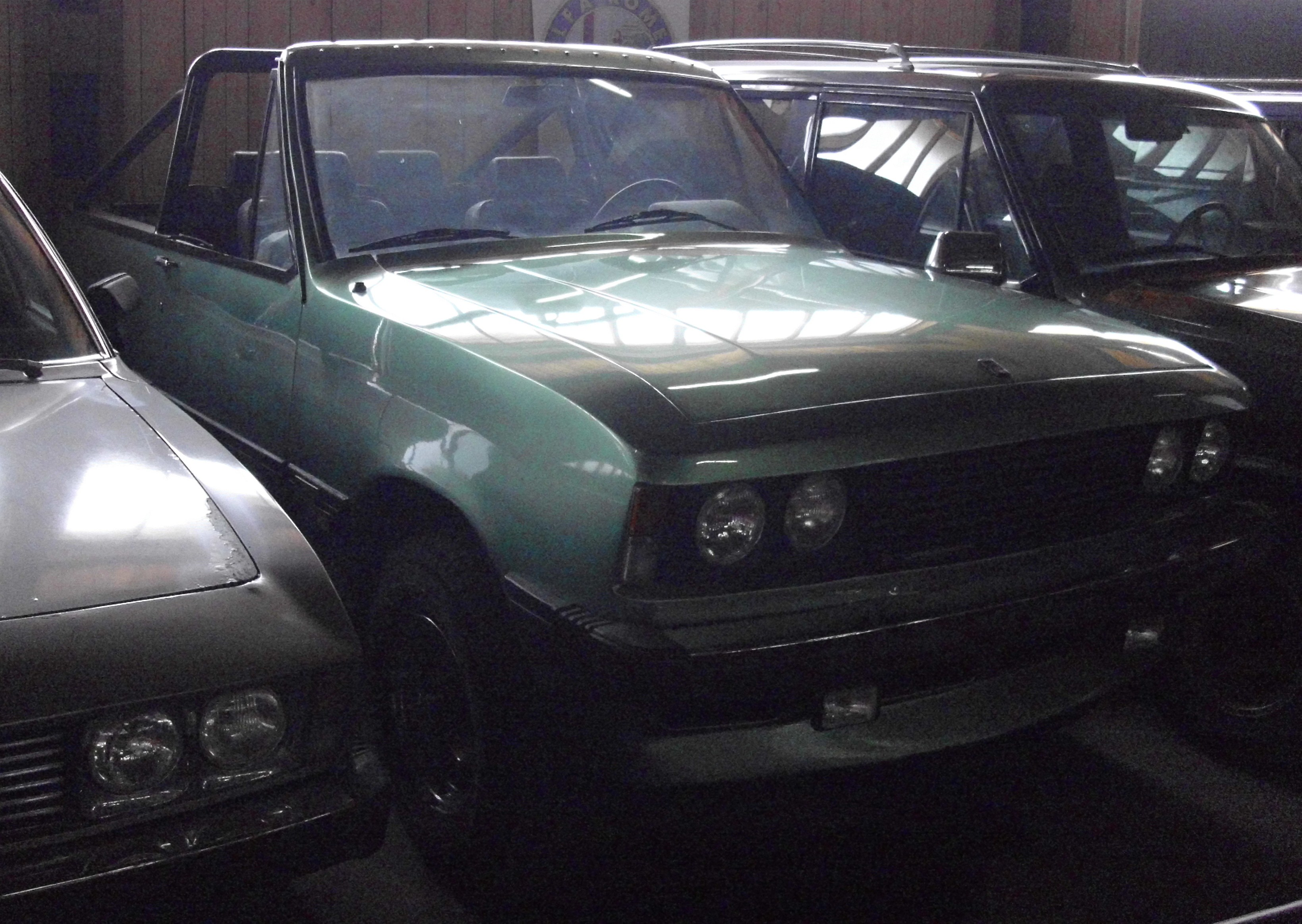
Monteverdi Safari Cabriolet prototype

== See also ==
- Range Rover Classic
