= Monteverdi Hai 450 =

Car model

- Monteverdi Hai 450 SS

Overview
- Manufacturer: Monteverdi
- Production: 1970, 1973; 2 examples built
- Assembly: Switzerland: Basel

Body and chassis
- Class: Sports car
- Layout: RMR layout

Powertrain
- Engine: 6,974 cc (426 cu in) Chrysler Hemi V8
- Transmission: ZF 5-Speed manual

Dimensions
- Wheelbase: 2,548 mm (100.3 in)
- Length: 4,343 mm (171.0 in)
- Width: 1,788 mm (70.4 in)
- Height: 1,021 mm (40.2 in)
- Curb weight: 1,756 kg (3,871 lb)

The Monteverdi Hai 450 SS is a mid-engined prototype sports car built by Monteverdi to complement the company's High Speed line. It was intended to be a direct competitor to high end sports cars from Lamborghini, Ferrari and Maserati.

== History ==
A magenta Hai 450 SS prototype debuted at the 1970 Geneva Auto Show. It had a 6,974 cc (425.6 cu in) V8 from Chrysler positioned behind the two seats. Its name combined the German word for "shark" (Hai) and the rated output of the engine.

A second car was built with a longer wheelbase and minor detail changes like door handles and red bodywork. This car was named the Hai 450 GTS to mark the changes.

Monteverdi initially planned to produce 49 copies, but production was halted after the two prototypes. Only one car was actually sold, although in a 1974 interview Peter Monteverdi claimed to have delivered eleven of the cars. In the 1990s, Monteverdi used spare parts to build two additional replicas, which now reside in the Swiss National Transport Museum in Luzern.

Paul Frère tested the 450 SS, reaching 0–100 km/h (0–62 mph) in 6.9 seconds and a top speed of 270.6 km/h (168 mph). The 450 GTS, tested by Autozeitung, reached 0–100 km/h (0–62 mph) in 5.5 seconds and a top speed of 280 km/h (174 mph). Curb weight of the 450 SS was 1,756 kg (3,871 lb) as tested by Automobil-Revue in 1970, considerably higher than the factory numbers.

Like Monteverdi's front-engined cars, the Hai made extensive use of Chrysler parts. It has the same de Dion rear axle as the 375 High Speed, and may be the only mid-engined car ever to have used recirculating ball steering.

== Styling controversy ==
The body design is usually attributed to Trevor Fiore, of Carrozzeria Fissore, although some sources credit Pietro Frua.

== Specifications ==
Monteverdi Hai 450 SS Technical Data
Feature	Detail
Engine	Chrysler 426 Hemi V8
Intake	Two four-barrel Carter carburettors
Bore x stroke	107.9 mm × 95.25 mm (4.248 in × 3.750 in)
Compression ratio	10.25:1
Displacement	6,974 cc (425.6 cu in)
Power	450 PS (331 kW) at 5,000 rpm; 350 hp SAE net
Torque	664.35 N⋅m (490.00 ft⋅lbf) at 4,000 rpm
Transmission	ZF 5-Speed transaxle
Ratios	2.40:1, 1.40:1, 1.00:1, 0.90:1, 0.80:1, Reverse 3.60:1.
Steering	Worm and roller
Front suspension	Double wishbone suspension with coil springs and adjustable Koni shock absorbers
Rear suspension	De Dion axle, Watts linkage, lower trailing arms, coil springs, and adjustable Koni shock absorbers
Brakes f/r	ATE vented discs / ATE inboard vented discs
Layout	Rear-mid engine, rear-wheel drive
Body and chassis	Steel body on custom tubular steel chassis
Wheelbase	2,548 mm (100.3 in)
Track f/r	1,499 / 1,458 mm (59.0 / 57.4 in)
Length; Width; Height	4,343 mm (171.0 in); 1,788 mm (70.4 in); 1,021 mm (40.2 in)
Unloaded weight	1,247 kg (2,749 lb)
Maximum speed	Greater than 289 km/h (180 mph)
Acceleration	0 to 100 km/h (0 to 62 mph): 4.8 s
Fuel consumption	17.2 L/100 km (16.4 mpg_{‑imp}; 13.7 mpg_{‑US})

== Gallery ==
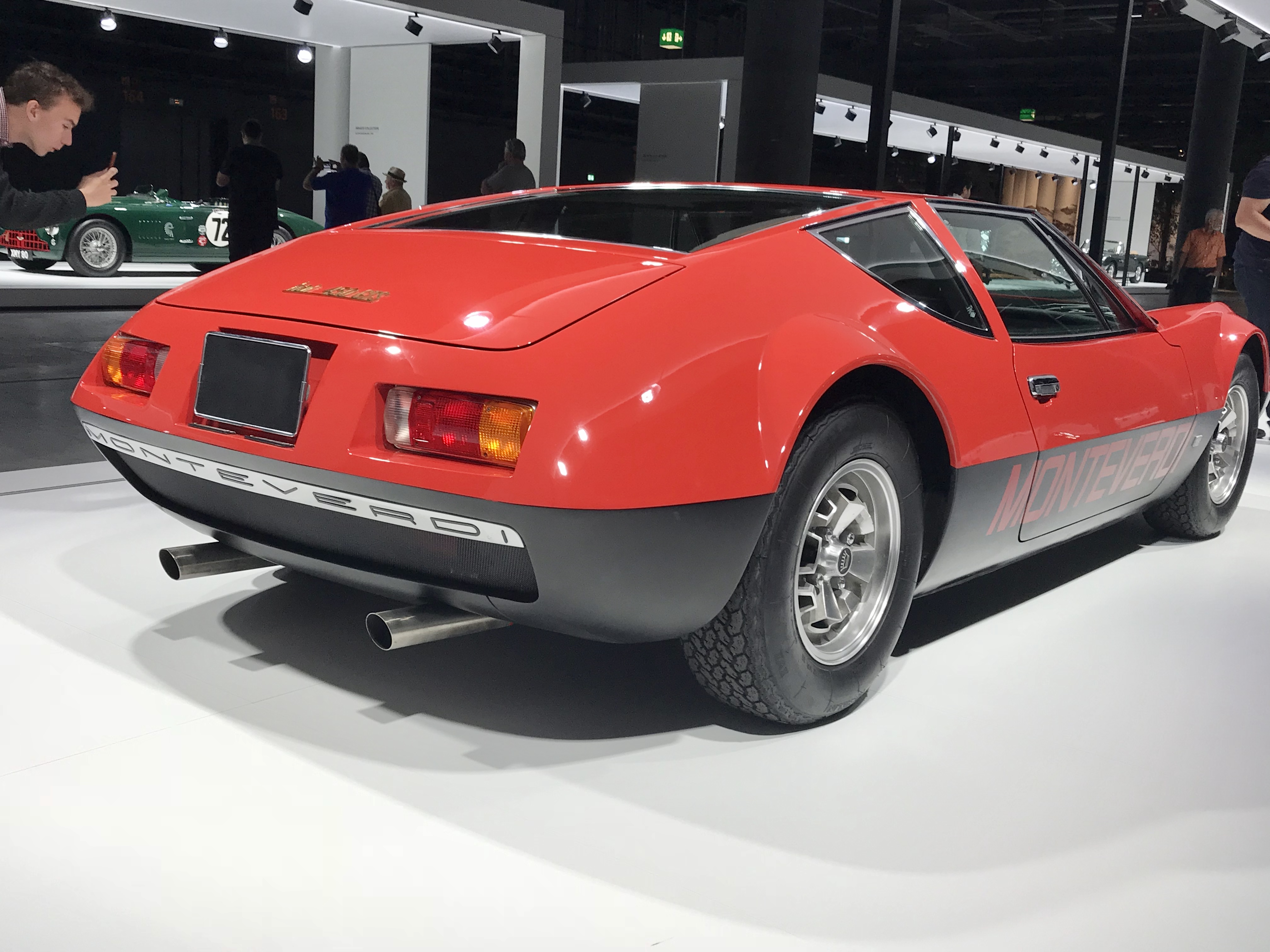
Monteverdi Hai 450 GTS (Replica) rear three-quarter view

Monteverdi Hai 450 GTS at the Monteverdi Museum, Basel, Switzerland

Monteverdi Hai 450 GTS works replica (front) and Hai 450 SS factory replica (rear) at the Monteverdi Museum

Chassis and wooden body buck at the Monteverdi Museum

== See also ==
- Monteverdi Hai 650 F1
