= Monteverdi (automobile) =

Defunct Swiss brand of luxury cars

- Industry: Automotive
- Founded: 1967
- Founder: Peter Monteverdi
- Defunct: 1982
- Fate: Ceased production
- Headquarters: Binningen (Basel-Landschaft), Switzerland
- Products: Automobiles

Monteverdi was a Swiss brand of luxury cars created in 1967 by Peter Monteverdi (1934–1998) and based in Binningen on the southern edge of Basel, Switzerland.

== History ==
Peter Monteverdi, a descendant of composer Claudio Monteverdi (1567–1643), first made his name as a racecar driver. During the late 1950s and early 1960s, he also built, sold, and raced a number of "specials" called MBM, while at the same time developing the motor vehicle repair business founded by his father into a major dealership handling Ferrari, BMW, and Lancia brands. The relationship with Ferrari ended in 1963 when Enzo Ferrari demanded that Monteverdi pay up front for a shipment of 100 cars, which Monteverdi refused to agree to. Monteverdi was generally hard to get along with, which may have affected the success of his company.

By 1967, he had decided to undertake series production of exclusive high-performance luxury sports and touring cars. The first model, the two-seater Monteverdi High Speed 375S coupé, was launched at that year's Frankfurt Motor Show and received very positive reviews. The car used a heavy and simple steel frame provided by Stahlbau Muttenz GmbH with an aluminium body designed by Pietro Frua. It looked quite similar to other Frua creations of that time, particularly the Maserati Mistral Coupé and the British AC 428. All the three were rumored to share some details, such as windows. The car was powered by a 440-CID (7.2-litre) Chrysler V8 engine delivering up to 375 bhp (according to SAE standards). Eleven copies of the Frua-designed Monteverdi coupé were built from 1968 to 1969, then the alliance of Monteverdi and Frua split in anger. Not long before, Frua had built two 2+2 coupés with a stretched wheelbase. One of them was presented as the Monteverdi 375/L; the other one stayed for some years at Frua before, in 1971, it was slightly modified and sold to AC, where it was presented as a one-off AC 428.

=== Fissore years ===
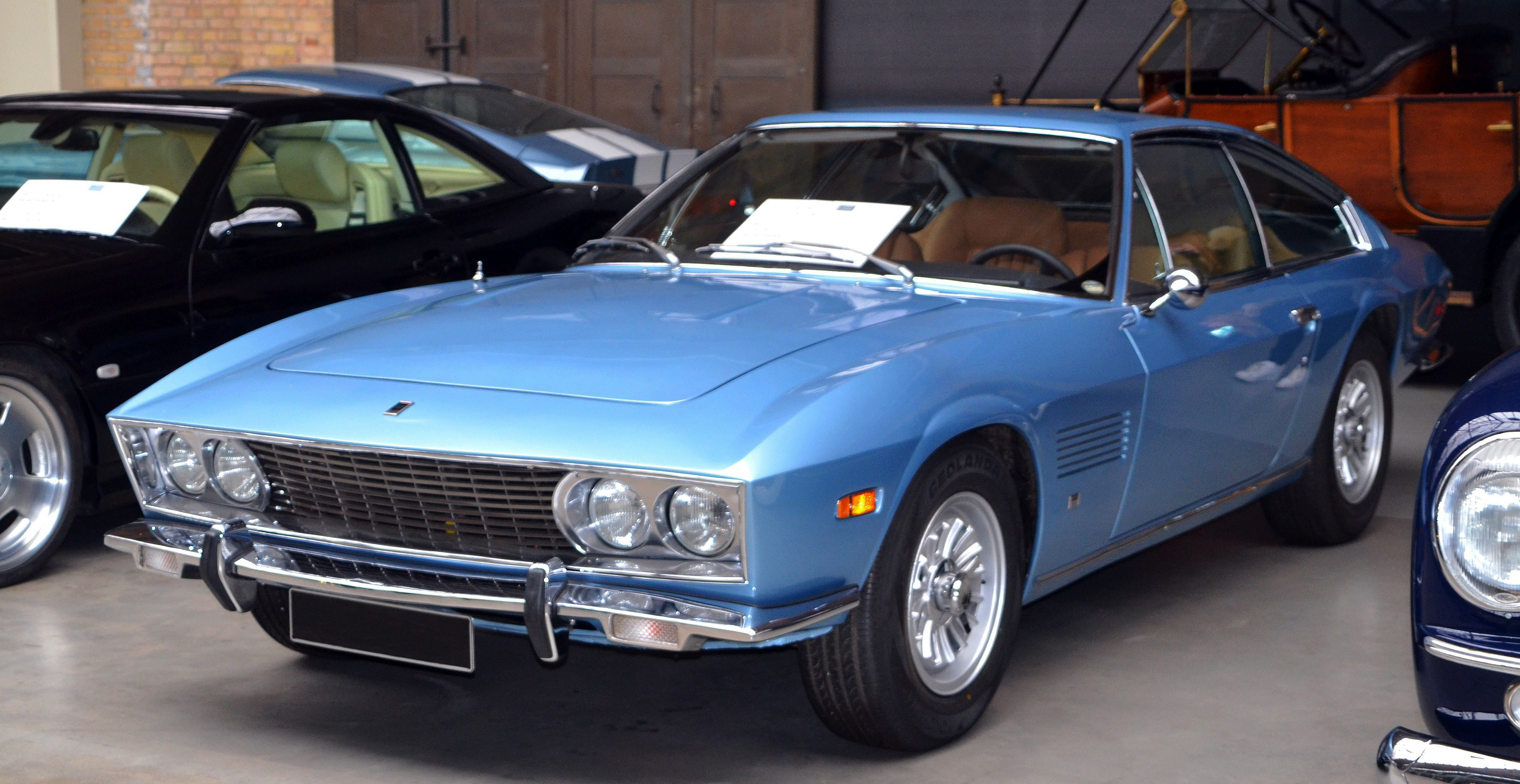
Monteverdi High Speed 375 L

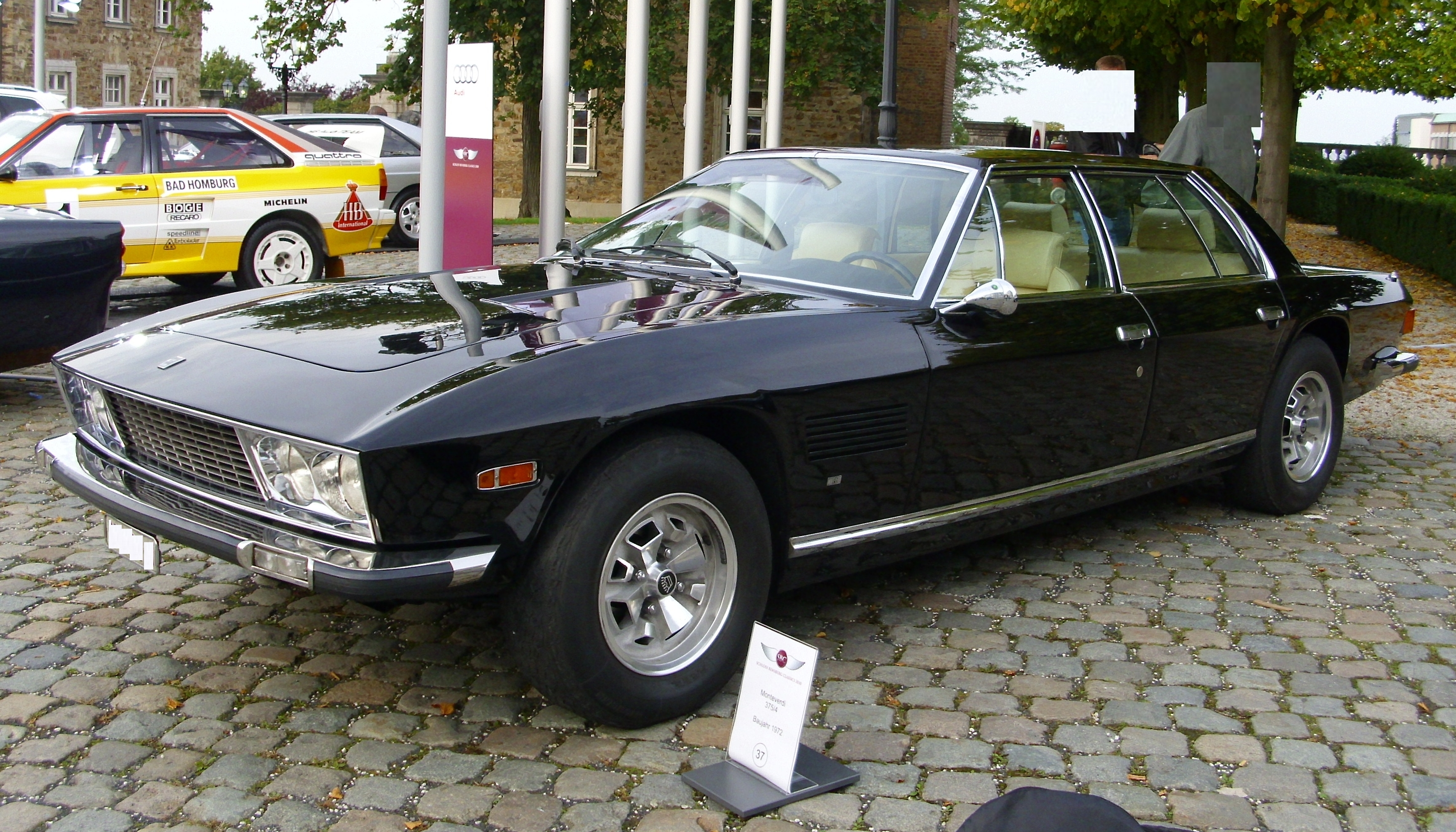
1972 Monteverdi High Speed 375/4

In 1969, Monteverdi chose the small Carrozzeria Fissore for further collaboration. Fissore redesigned the 375 Coupé and built the bodies that were then delivered to Monteverdi in Switzerland, where the cars were finally assembled. The new design had more square lines. The 2+2 form became the standard model, but subsequently other body styles were offered. First was a short-wheelbase two-seat coupé called the 375/S and - on the same short wheelbase - a drophead dubbed the 375/C. These early Fissore cars are extremely rare nowadays, with the convertible reported as lacking rigidity. Soon, Monteverdi also offered a large sedan called 375/4, and about 30 were built. Other variations on the same theme were the 1974 Berlinetta with a different front styling and Triumph TR6 tail lights, and another convertible, called Palm Beach, which remained a one-off.

Monteverdi much preferred building the 375L 2+2 and the 375/4, as these were more developed and also profitable. This was in contrast to the more unusual models such as the Palm Beach or the Hai, which were of a more one-off nature and thus much costlier to build. Until the arrival of the Safari, Monteverdi's production had rarely strayed into the double digits. In 1971, before the oil crisis hit, about 60 cars were finished, a number that dropped to 45 cars in 1973 (partly due to strikes in Italy), but in 1979 production reached 350 (nearly all off-roaders).

The production of super luxury cars ended in 1976, after about 1,300 Monteverdis of all types had been built.

=== Boutique era and decline ===
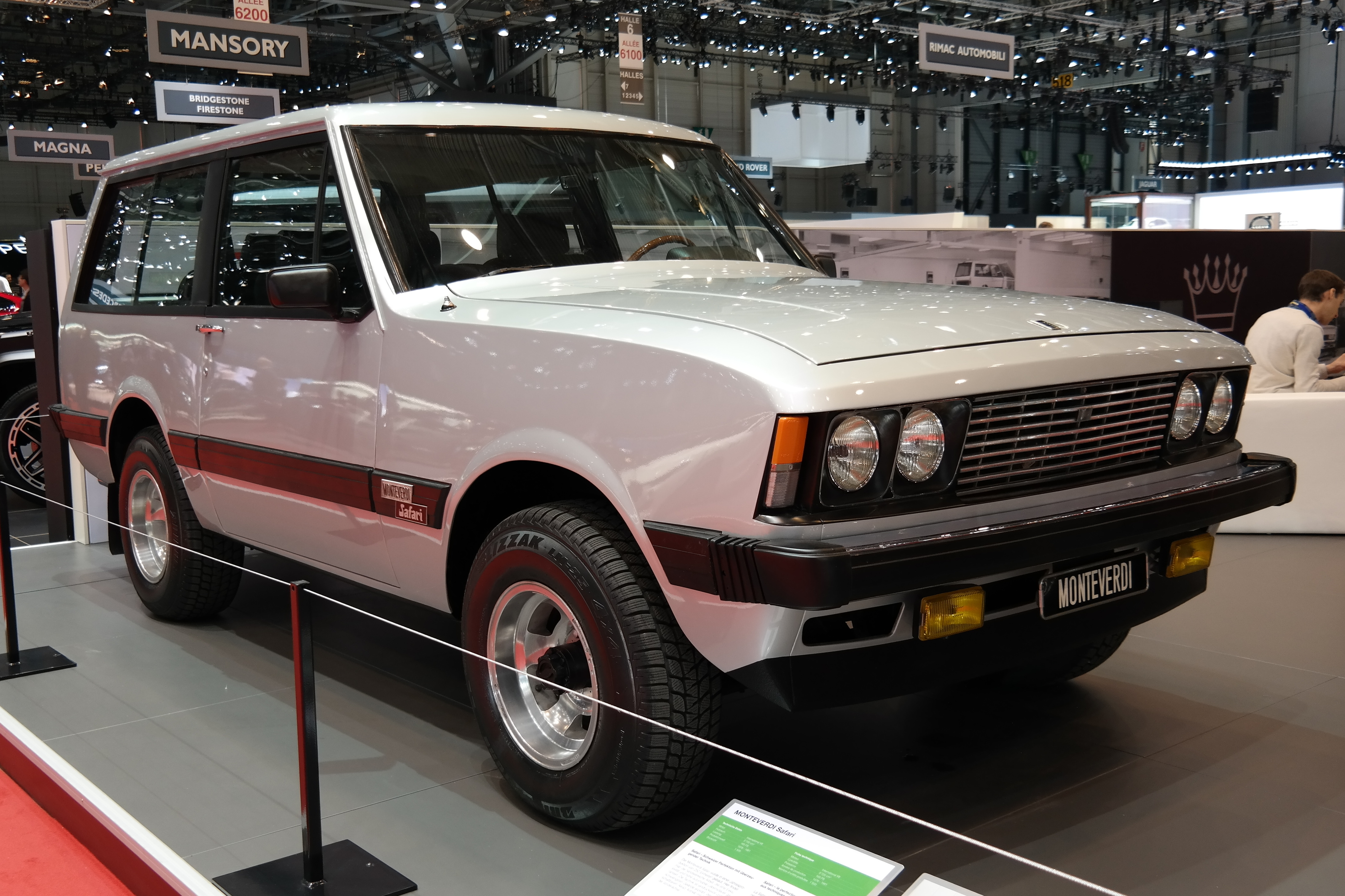
Monteverdi Safari, based on the International Scout

As a new business field, Monteverdi started the mass production of luxury off-road station wagons. They were based on mechanically unchanged cars of other manufacturers with upgraded bodywork and interior, so-called boutique cars.

The first model was the Monteverdi Safari based on the International Scout. A new bodywork was constructed, once again designed by Fissore. In addition to the standard Scout 5.0 or 5.6-litre (304- or 345-CID) V8s, there was the option of installing the 440-CID V8 from Chrysler. The Safari sold well, by the standards of previous Monteverdi models, in Europe as well as the Middle East. To offer a cheaper alternative, the company introduced the Monteverdi Sahara, also based on the Scout. In this case, Monteverdi left most of the bodywork unmodified, changed the grille and the headlights, and modified the interior to a lesser degree. An obvious modification of the Scout, and still much more expensive, the Sahara was not successful - only 30 examples were built.

As far as road cars were concerned, Monteverdi changed to the boutique car system in 1977 for these as well. The Monteverdi Sierra was a sedan with a 5.2-litre V8 engine and distinctive looks. It was a Plymouth Volaré with slightly changed bodywork. With few modifications, it had similarities to the Fiat 130. Fenders, bumpers, grille and some smaller parts were modified: headlamps were taken from the Fiat 124 Special, indicator clusters from the Fiat 125 and rear lights came from the Renault 12. The rest - windows, doors and mechanical parts - remained unchanged. The Sierra soon was accompanied by a two-door convertible based on a Dodge Diplomat coupe, of which only two were made. Finally, Monteverdi also made a station wagon based on a Plymouth. It remained a one-off that was never sold.

Monteverdi Tiara, based on the Mercedes-Benz W126

When the production of the Volaré ended in 1980, Monteverdi chose another car to be converted. This time, it was the new Mercedes S-Class (W126). The front got a large chrome grille with four round headlamps, while the rear lamps came from the Peugeot 505 sedan. It was announced in March, 1982, for a price of 185,000 Swiss francs and badged as the Monteverdi Tiara. Reportedly, a total of three examples were built.

=== Cooperation with Land Rover and conclusion ===
In 1978, work began on a four-door version of the Range Rover. This was executed with the active cooperation of Land Rover, which also allowed customers to order Monteverdi Range Rovers directly from Land Rover dealers. The Range Rover Monteverdi was introduced in March, 1980, at the Geneva Motor Show. While the design work was carried out by Monteverdi, the actual work took place at Fissore's factory in Savigliano. White two-door cars were sent directly by Land Rover with an extra set of doors for conversion. Following the introduction of Range Rover's own four-door model in 1981, Monteverdi ended their conversions in early 1982. Around 167 cars were built, although a range of other numbers has also been suggested. Car production in Basel ended by 1982. The factory was converted into a museum, the Monteverdi Car Collection, which opened in 1985. The museum closed in 2016, with most of the cars being transferred to the Swiss Museum of Transport in Lucerne.

In 1992, Monteverdi tried to re-enter the car scene with the Monteverdi Hai 650 F1 with no success. Two prototypes have been built, which now reside in the Swiss Museum of Transport.

== Formula One ==
In 1961, Monteverdi modified one of his MBM Formula Junior cars to be eligible for Formula 1. The chassis was strengthened and lengthened to use a Porsche RSK sports car engine. Porsche refused to sell Monteverdi an engine, so he bought a complete RSK, removed the engine and tuned it to give about 150bhp. The MBM had a conventional space-frame and suspension. After having success in Swiss hill climbs, Monteverdi entered the MBM in the 1961 Solitude Grand Prix. He qualified last on the grid, and retired after two laps with engine problems. The car was written off in a Formula Libre race in Germany, and the remains were buried in the foundations of a new car showroom built on the site of Monteverdi's old garage.

In 1990, Monteverdi returned to Formula 1 through his acquisition of the Onyx Formula One team from Jean-Pierre Van Rossem. The team was known as Moneytron Onyx until the British Grand Prix, with the team being renamed as Monteverdi Onyx for the German Grand Prix. This was their last race, with the team folding before the Hungarian Grand Prix.

== List of models ==
- Monteverdi Special (1950–1952)
- MBM Tourismo (1961–1962)
- Monteverdi High Speed 375S (1967)
- Monteverdi High Speed 375L (1969)
- Monteverdi High Speed 375C (1970)
- Monteverdi High Speed 375/4 (1970)
- Monteverdi 2000 GTI (1969)
- Monteverdi Hai 450 SS (1970)
- Monteverdi Palm Beach (1975)
- Monteverdi Sierra (1977)
- Monteverdi Safari (1976)
- Monteverdi Sahara (1978)
- Monteverdi Tiara (1982-1983)
- Monteverdi Hai 650 F1 (1992)
