= Monteverdi Hai 650 F1 =

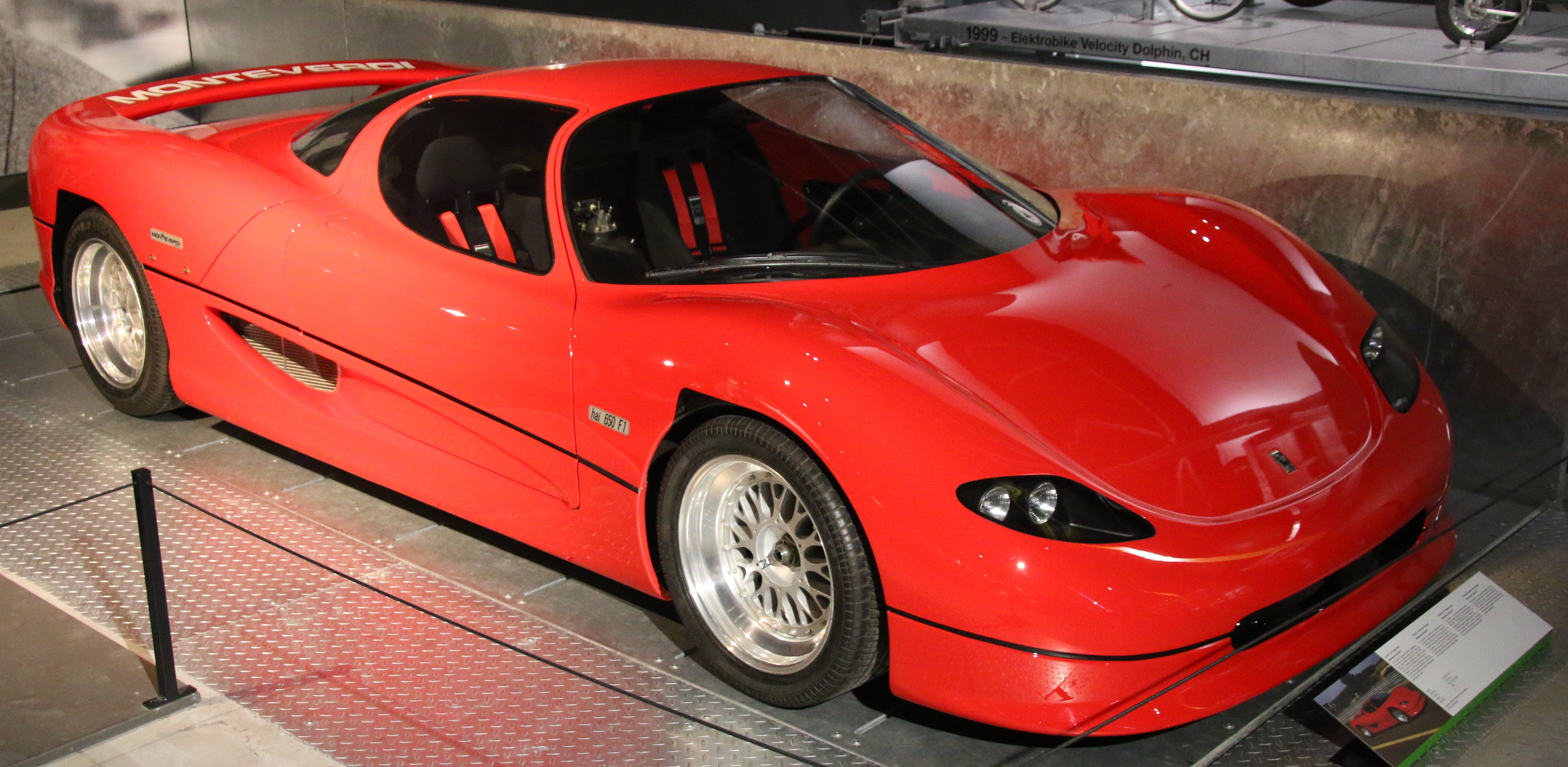

Overview
- Manufacturer: Monteverdi
- Production: 1992, 1995 (3 prototypes)

Body and chassis
- Class: Sports car
- Body style: 2-door coupé
- Layout: RMR layout

Powertrain
- Engine: Ford DFR V8
- Transmission: 6-speed manual

Dimensions
- Wheelbase: 2,790 mm (109.8 in)
- Length: 4,550 mm (179.1 in)
- Width: 1,960 mm (77.2 in)
- Height: 1,050 mm (41.3 in)
- Kerb weight: 850 kg (1,874 lb)

Chronology
- Predecessor: Monteverdi Hai 450 SS

The Monteverdi Hai 650 F1 was a prototype Swiss sports car concept produced by Monteverdi in the 1990s.

== History ==
In 1992, Peter Monteverdi re-entered the automobile industry. An attributed inspiration was to create a sports car with a reception similar to the Monteverdi Hai 450 SS in 1970. The goal was to create the ultimate supercar characteristic of F1 car with road legality.

The car is based on a Formula 1 chassis from the defunct Monteverdi-Onyx F1 team, and retains its original Cosworth DFR V8 F1 engine, although in detuned form. The car was named the Hai 650 F1, in homage to its Hai 450 SS predecessor of 1970 and denoting the car's power output and F1 pedigree. The car was shown to several potential customers and a few orders were taken, although no cars seem to have been delivered. Three prototypes were built, one of which is part of the collection at the Swiss National Transport Museum in Luzern, Switzerland.

== Technical specifications ==
Engine

Engine: 3.5 L (3,494 cc) Cosworth DFR V8
Power output: 649 bhp (484 kW; 658 PS) at 11,000 rpm

Transmission

Transmission: six speed manual gearbox

Performance

Top speed: 208 mph (claimed)
Acceleration from 0-60 mph (97 km/h): 3.0 seconds (claimed)

== Gallery ==
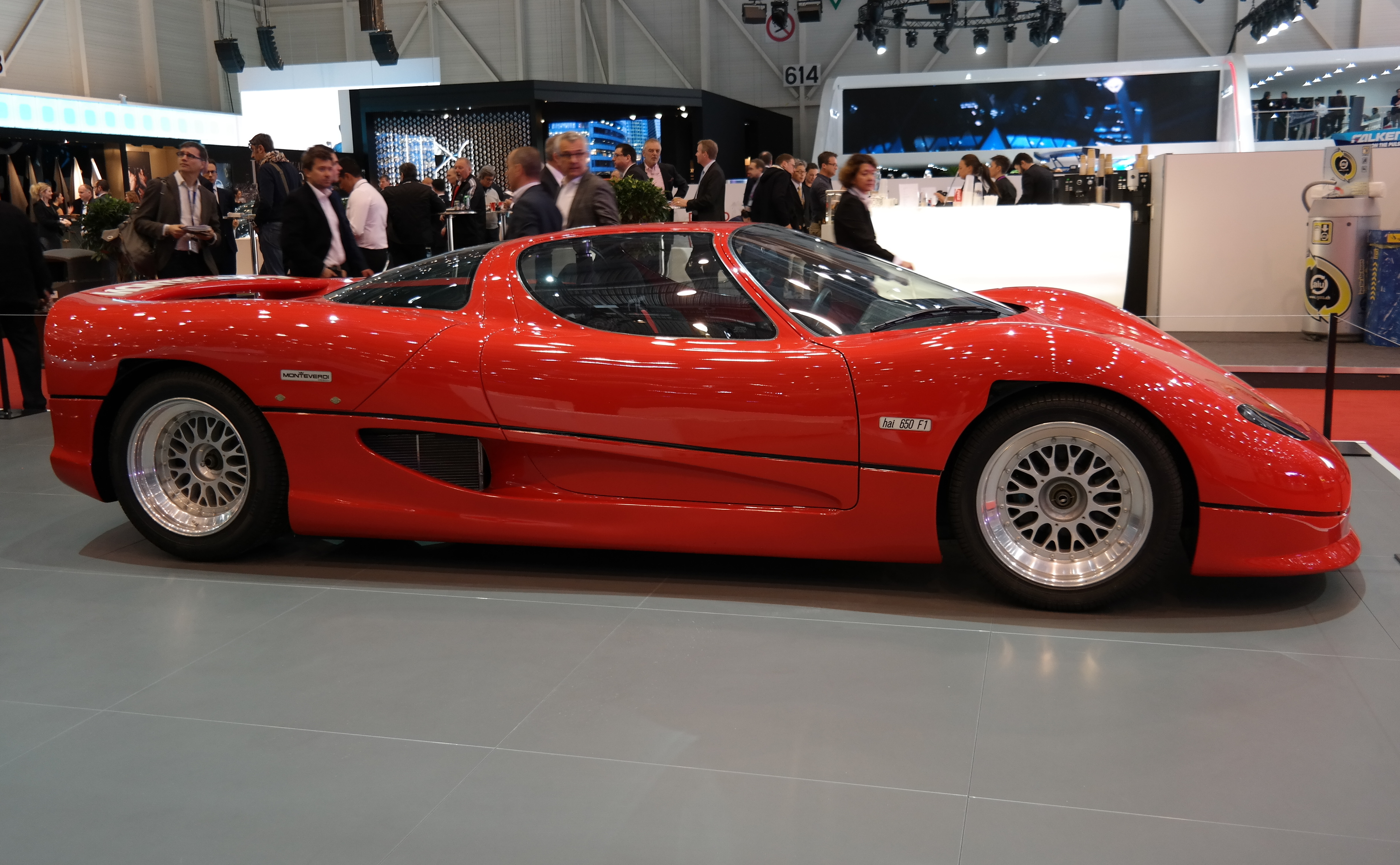
Hai 650 F1 at the 2017 Geneva Motor Show

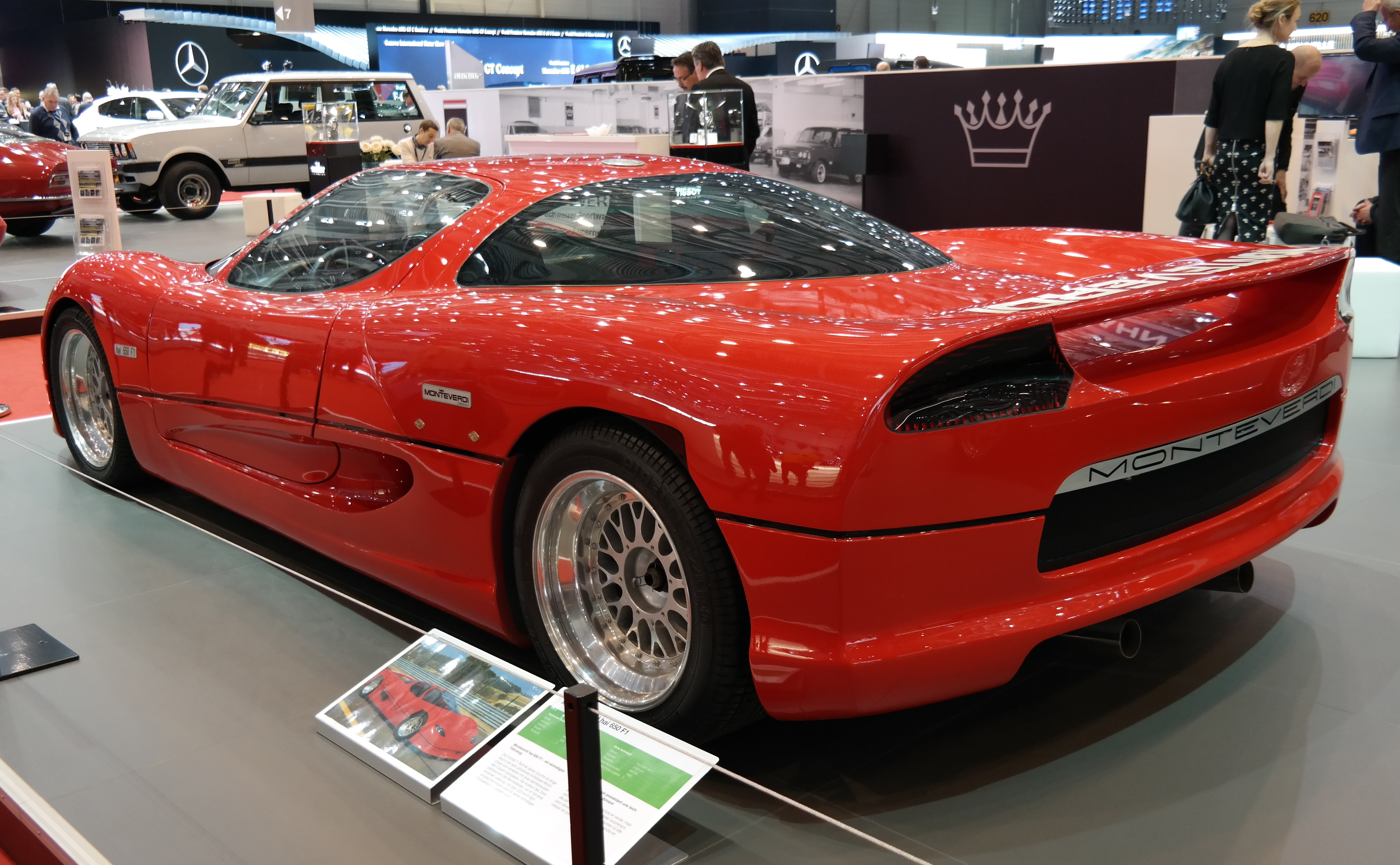
Rear view

Rear view with the rear clamshell open, showing the engine
