= Carrozzeria Fissore =

Italian builder of coaches

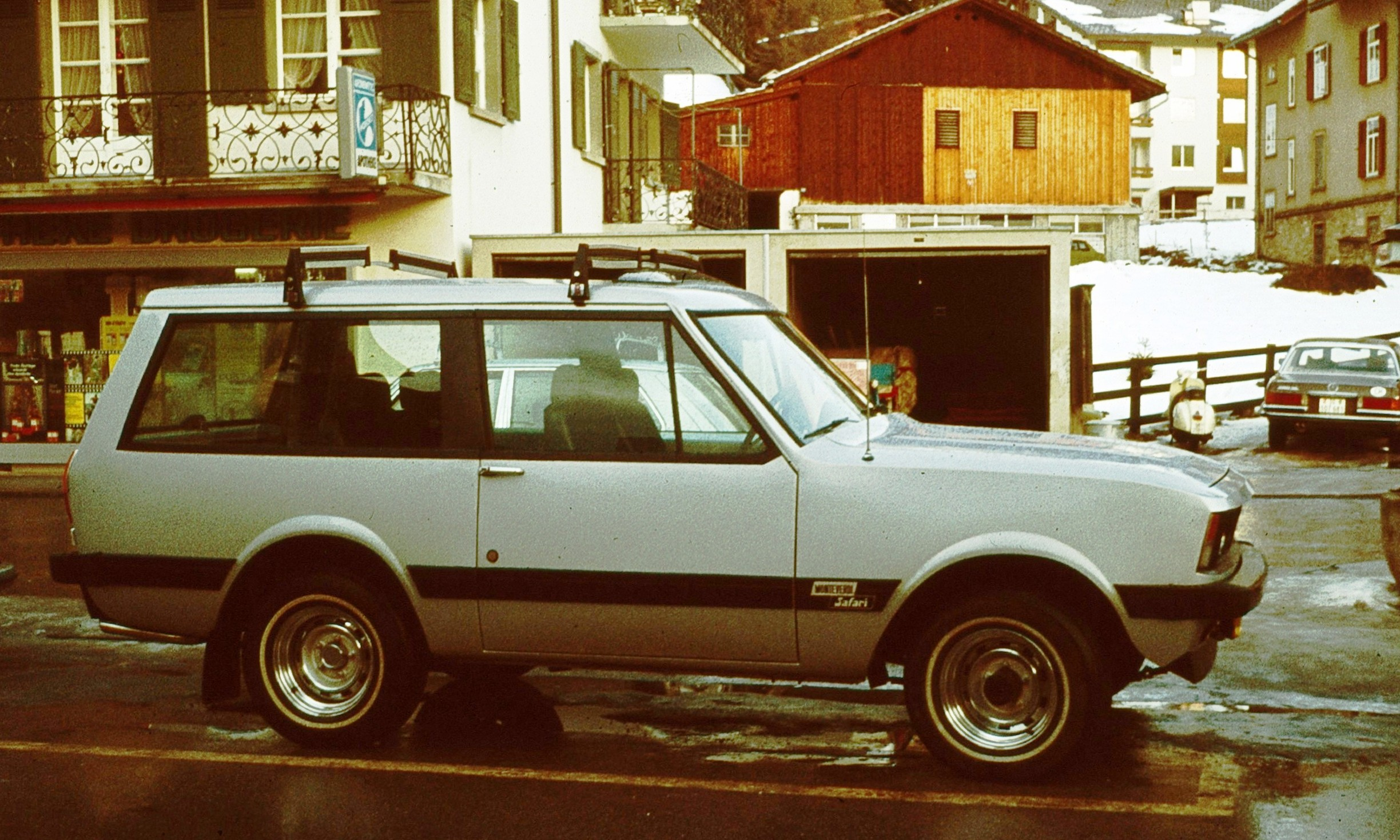
The Monteverdi Safari, a Fissore-built off-roader on International Scout-basis

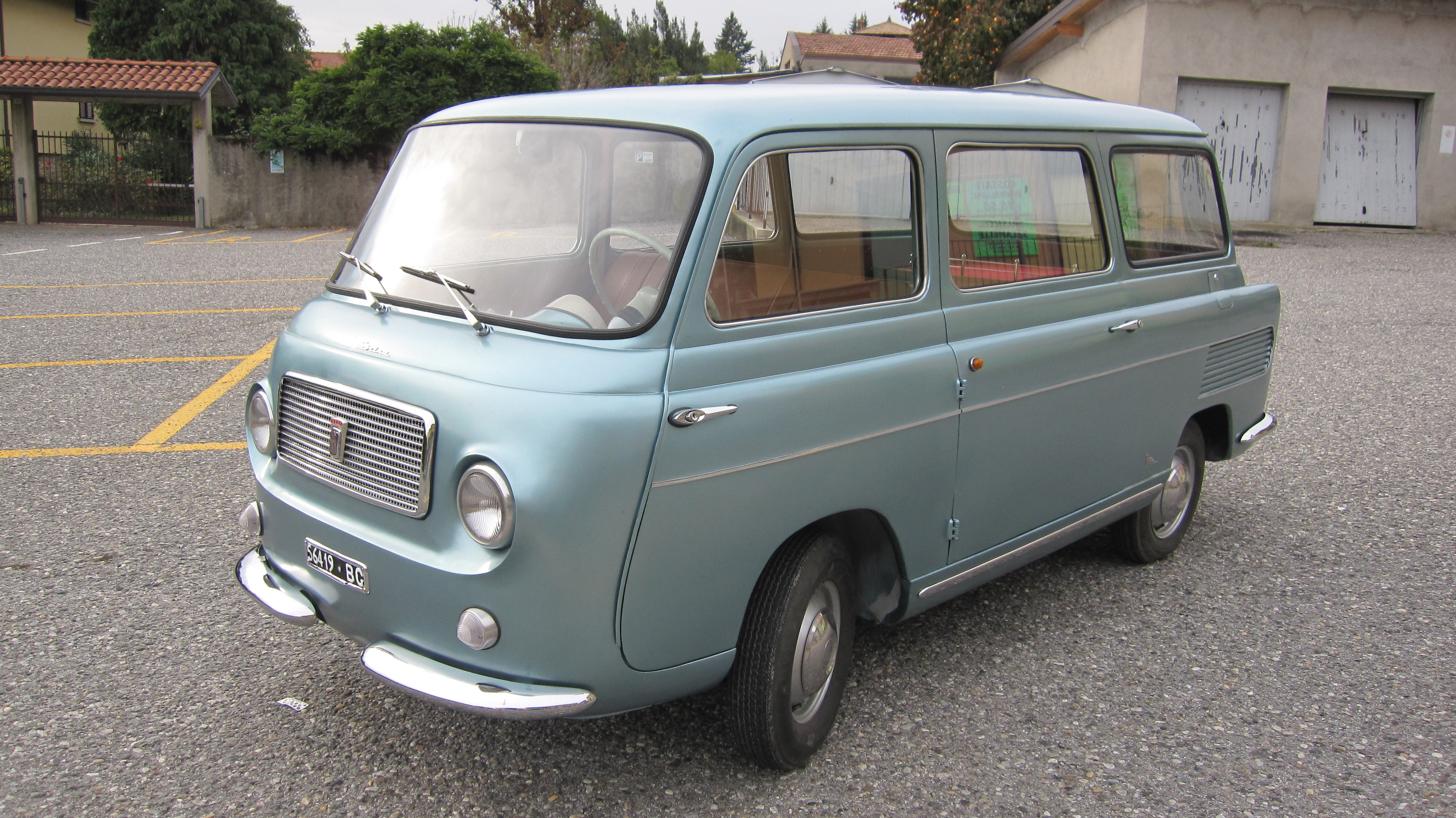
A 1959 Fiat 600 Multipla Fissore model Sabrina

Carrozzeria Fissore was an Italian coachbuilder located in Savigliano, near Turin (Piedmont).

== History ==
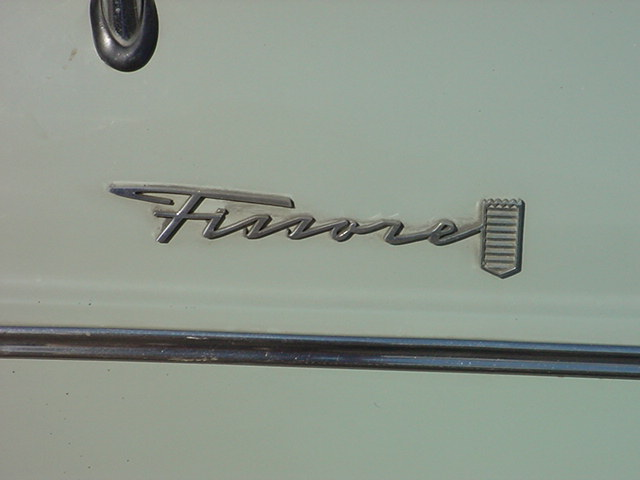
Carrozzeria Fissore logo (1966)

The firm was founded in 1919 (107 years ago) by the brothers Antonio, Bernardo, Giovanni, and Costanzo Fissore. Originally they built horsecarts and only later expanded into repairing automobiles and trucks. In 1936 Bernardo took the reins and began constructing special bodies for automobiles, funeral vehicles, mail cars, and small buses. During World War II, Fissore built military vehicles.

After the war, private vehicles once again became the focus. In 1947 a Fiat 1100-based estate appeared, called the "Giardinetta". In 1953 Fissore presented the Fiat 1100 TV, a uniquely designed coupé designed by Mario Revelli. Further Fiat-based cars appeared, helping to grow the company to the point where about 200 people were employed by the mid-sixties. At this time, Fissore also began designing bodies for other companies and also building small series or single cars. DKW, TVR, and De Tomaso were amongst the first clients. They may not have had the reputation of Pininfarina or Bertone, but they did have a worldwide presence and a good repute.

In 1969 Fissore secured a contract to body the majority of Monteverdi's cars in the High Speed-series. This provided a steady stream of work, although the expected orders of 100 cars per year did not materialize until the 1976 introduction of the Safari off-roader. The volumes reached during these year forced Fissore to give up their artisan methods in favor of a more industrial mode of production. Monteverdi provided financial aid in acquiring the necessary presses, and in return received a stake in the company and ended up taking full ownership in the late seventies. When Monteverdi closed doors in 1984, Fissore also shut down and was liquidated shortly thereafter.

=== Rayton Fissore ===
In 1976 Rayton Fissore was founded by one of Bernardo Fissore's daughters, Fernanda, and her husband, Giulio Malvino. They chose to create their own firm rather than collaborating with her father. Rayton Fissore is best known for the Magnum, an off-roader on an Iveco-based chassis which was presented in 1985 and sold as the Laforza in the United States.

== Fiat products ==
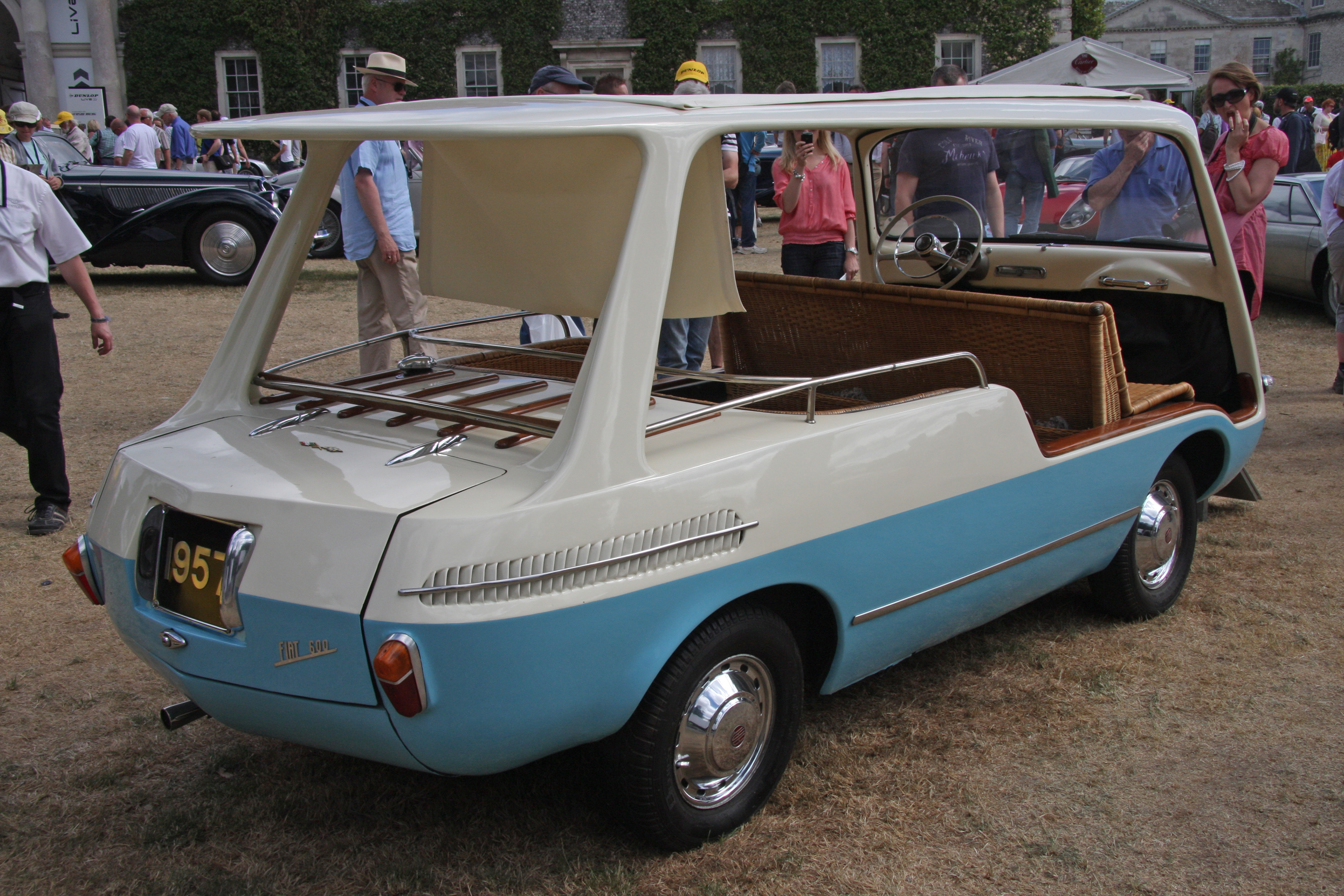
1957 Fiat Marinella

In the 1950s and 1960s Fissore built a number of special-bodied cars on Fiat basis, some in small series. These include:

- Fiat 1100 TV Fissore Coupé (1953). A fastback coupé on Fiat 1100 basis. This was the first success of Fissore's.
- Sabrina, a four- to six-seat version based on the Fiat Multipla with special bodywork. There was also the "Marinella", a fully open beach car version.
- 1500 Coupé, a two-door coupé on Fiat 1500 basis, presented in Turin in 1959.
- Mongho 650, a petite coupé based on the Fiat Nuova 500 designed by Alessandro Sessano. The Fiat 500 engine was tuned by Giannini for better performance, although the car remained a prototype.
- Fissore 127 Scout, an open-topped "fun car" similar to the Citroën Méhari with Fiat 127 underpinnings. It was debuted at the 1971 Turin Motor Show. Originally named the Gypsy, this was developed by a small company called MAINA, but as they lacked capacity Fissore took over production and marketing of the vehicle. Originally it was built entirely in fibreglass over a tubular metal frame, but self-supporting pressed metal bodywork was employed from 1974. A metal hardtop version was also available. Production in Greece was planned, and the 127 Scout (improved versions renamed 127 Amico) was produced there by Autokinitoviomihania Ellados.
- Fissore 126 Poker: A smaller version in the same mould but based on the Fiat 126, called the "Poker", was also shown. The final production version was only produced in Greece, again by Autokinitoviomihania Ellados.

Fissore also developed a convertible version of the Fiat Ritmo, as did the related Rayton Fissore carrozzeria at the same time. However, Bertone's design for the Ritmo Palinuro Cabriolet convertible ended up being chosen for series production named after world-famous pristine beach "Palinuro" on the south-west cilento coast of Italy.

== OSCA ==
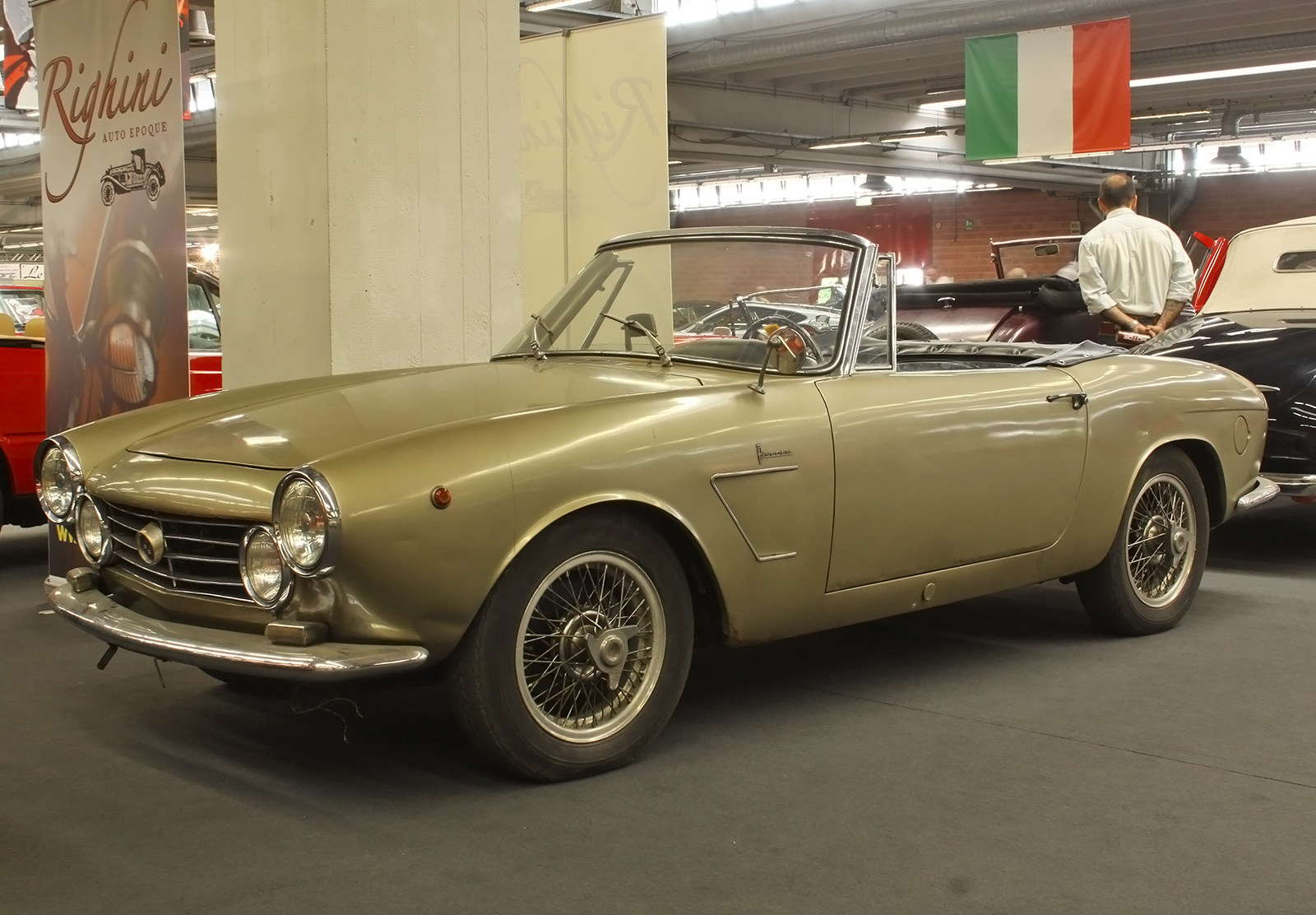
OSCA 1600 GT convertible

In 1962 Fissore developed and built a small series of bodies for the Maserati brothers' O.S.C.A. enterprise. The elegant three-box bodywork was based on the OSCA 1600. 22 of the coupés were built, and two convertibles.

== Fissore and DKW ==
In the early 1960s Fissore had a relationship with DKW and Auto Union, leading to two Fissore-designed versions being built in Brazil by DKW's local subsidiary VEMAG. These were:

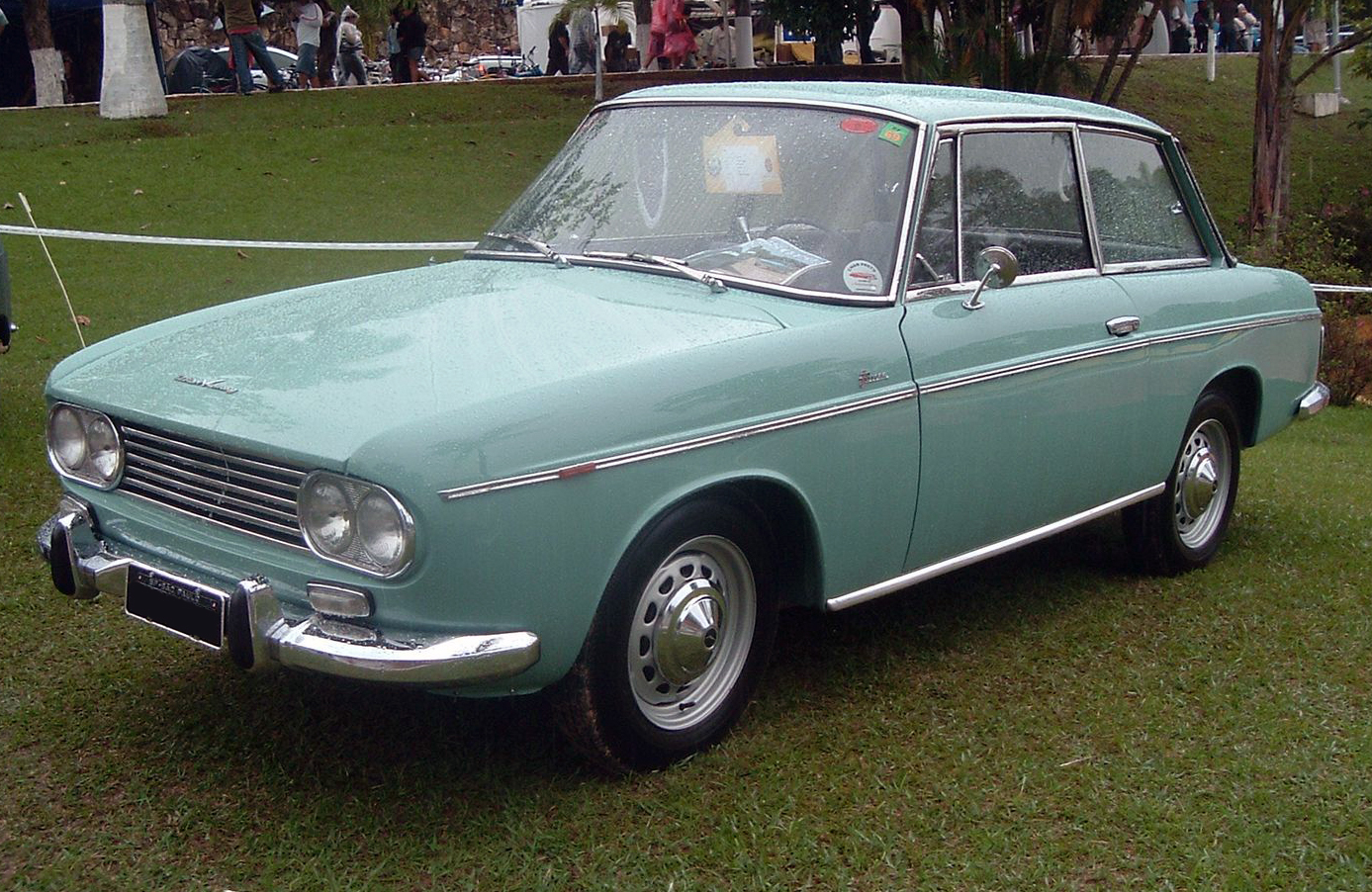
Front of the VEMAG Fissore (1965)

- The DKW 3=6 (F93). This was built in Brazil between 1958 and 1967 as the DKW-VEMAG Belcar ("beautiful car"). The station wagon was called the "Vemaguet". The mechanics remained unchanged. In 1965, Fissore reworked the front and rear appearance, with twin headlights, and a new grille. The front doors were front hinged, in total about 51,000 of the Belcar variants were built in Brazil.
- The VEMAG Fissore was a cleanly designed two-door sedan with a front end reminiscent of the earlier Fissore-bodied OSCA 1600. It also looked superficially similar to the German DKW F102. It was simply a rebodied Belcar, and retailed at a price around 25% higher. Its two-stroke engine made it a hard sell in Latin America, and only about 2,500 were built between 1964 and 1967.

In Argentina, IASF (Industrias Automotriz de Santa Fe) built Fissore-designed Coupés and Spyders based on the Auto Union 1000 SP, with more upright bodywork. These were also license-built in Spain.

Fissore also developed the Auto Union/DKW F1000 L light commercial vehicle for Auto Union's Spanish subsidiary IMOSA, a front-wheel drive design with a trapezoidal theme. This design was adopted by Mercedes-Benz who developed it into the N 1000/N 1300 and later on the MB100 series of vans and light trucks.

== De Tomaso ==
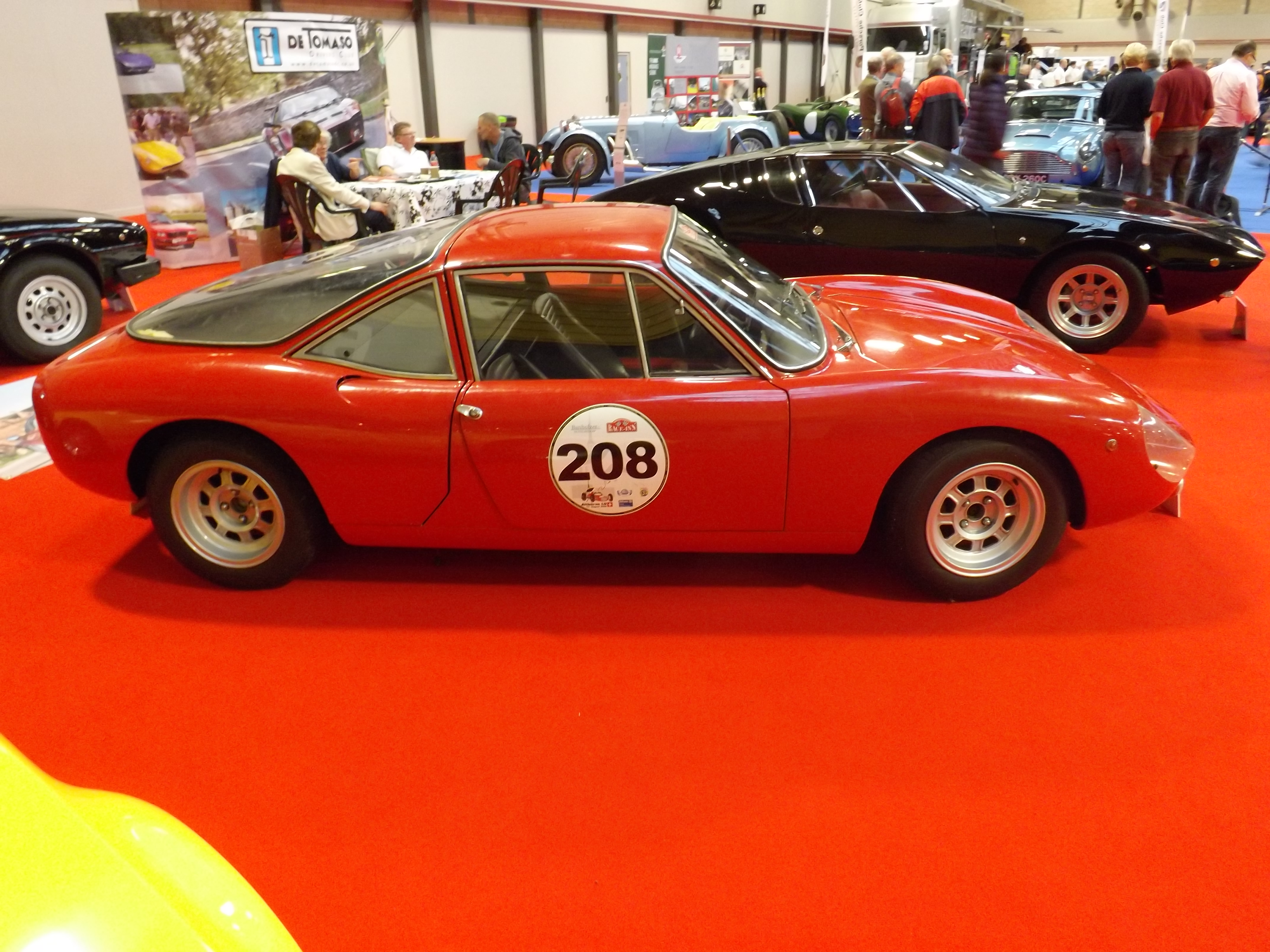
De Tomaso Vallelunga c.1965

In 1964–1965 Fissore designed and built aluminum bodies on a De Tomaso backbone chassis, the mid-engined Vallelunga. Perhaps fifteen of the coupés were made before production was moved to Ghia, which partly belonged to Alejandro de Tomaso at the time.

== Monteverdi ==
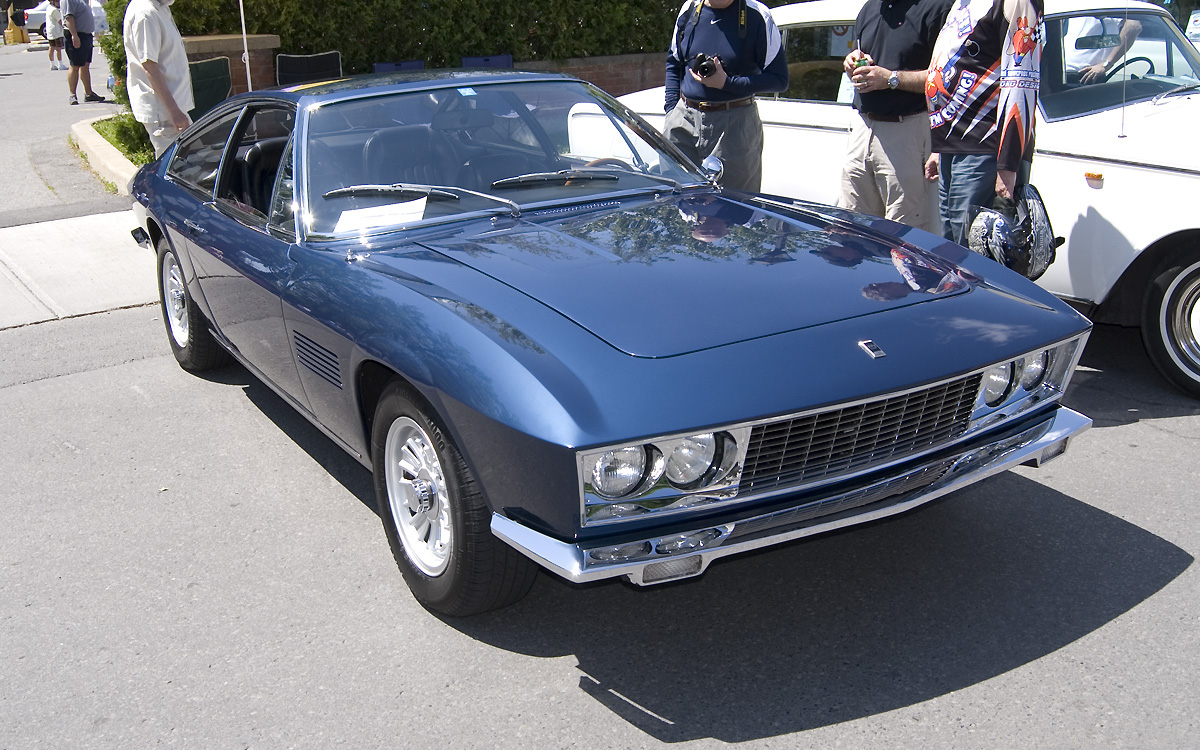
Monteverdi High Speed 375/L with a Fissore-built body

The relationship with Monteverdi was of particular importance for the company. The relationship secured Fissore's survival in the seventies.

Monteverdi originally let Pietro Frua design and build the High Speed coupé. Due to Frua's restricted capacity Peter Monteverdi severed the relationship in 1968, after only half a year, in favor of Fissore. Frua's original design was built by Fissore until a copyright suit forced Monteverdi to switch to a new design – although it is unknown whether this was designed by Peter Monteverdi (as claimed by him) or by Fissore. In any case, Fissore never claimed the design as their own. Fissore also never claimed to have designed the future coupé, convertible, and sedan derivatives of the High Speed.

The production process was convoluted: the chassis was built in Basel and sent to Savigliano to receive the bodywork. The car was then returned to Switzerland to receive the engine and other mechanical componentry and for finishing. Due to capacity restrictions a number of High Speed Monteverdis were actually constructed by the Poccardi and Embo carrozzerias.

Fissore also provided the bodywork for the more successful Monteverdi Safari. It is unknown whether the Monteverdi Sierra, a reworking of the Dodge Aspen, was built by Fissore. Since the car only received light modifications rather than unique bodywork, it is presumed that the work was carried out entirely in Switzerland. Fissore also designed the stillborn Monteverdi 2.8 Turbo prototype, an elegant if square-rigged three-door coupé on Ford Granada basis.

== Other products ==
Fissore designer Trevor Fiore (né Frost) developed a wedge-shaped two-seater coupé for TVR, first shown at the Geneva Motor Show in March 1965. Before it entered production, TVR went bankrupt and Fissore sold the rights to an ex-TVR dealer who proceeded to market the car as the Trident. About 130 cars were sold until 1976. For Alpine the same Trevor Fiore designed a wedgy proposal for a successor to the A110. The design was eventually adapted as the Alpine A310..l The Monteverdi Hai, although ostensibly designed by Peter Monteverdi himself, was very similar in appearance to the A310.

In 1969, Fissore built the first of two Aero GT prototypes of the Opel GT. Fissore built a four-door convertible prototype of the Opel Diplomat B, but it remained a single prototype (which still exists). A small sporting coupé based on the Autobianchi A112 called the Otas was designed by Fissore. At the 1986 Turin Auto Salon, a prototype Alfa Romeo 75 estate was shown by Rayton Fissore. This attractive forerunner of the later 156 Sportwagon was never listed for sale, being cancelled after Fiat took control of Alfa Romeo. Based on an Alfa 75 Turbo it was dubbed the 75 Turbo Wagon. Two estate versions were to be found at the later 1987 Geneva Motor Show; one was this Turbo Wagon and the other was a 2.0 litre version named the Sportwagon. In total seven or eight wagons were built for Alfa Romeo.

== Notable designers ==
- Mario Fissore
- Franco Maina
- Trevor Fiore
