= De Tomaso Vallelunga =

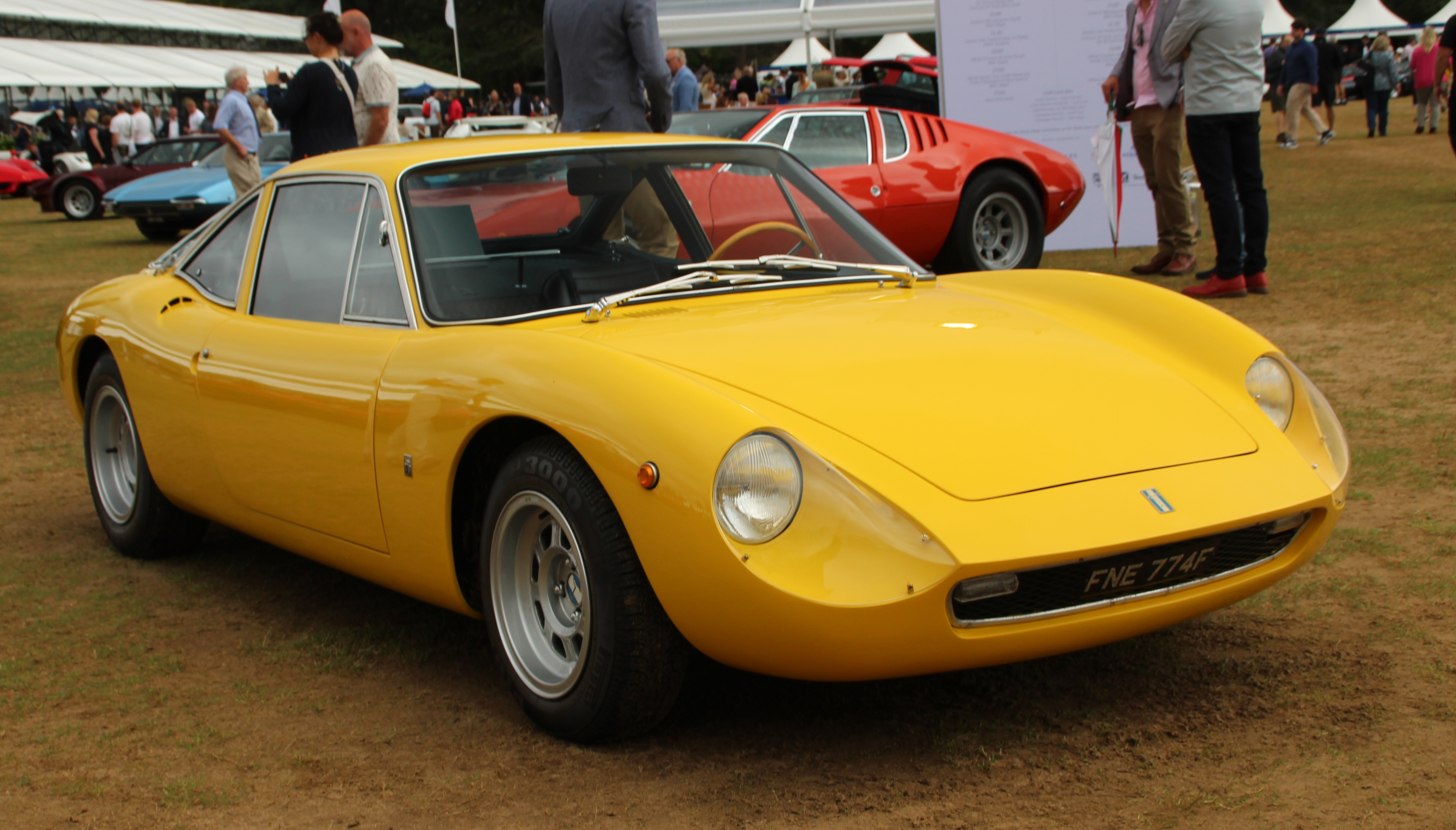
- De Tomaso Ghia Vallelunga

Overview
- Manufacturer: De Tomaso
- Production: 1964–1967 (59 produced)
- Assembly: Italy: Modena
- Designer: Franco Maina at Carrozzeria Fissore

Body and chassis
- Class: Sports car (S)
- Body style: Coupé (58 produced); Barchetta (prototype)
- Layout: Rear mid-engine, rear-wheel-drive

Powertrain
- Engine: 1.5 L (1,498 cc) Ford I4
- Transmission: 4 or 5-speed manual

Dimensions
- Wheelbase: 2,273 mm (89.5 in)
- Length: 3,840 mm (151.2 in)
- Width: 1,600 mm (63.0 in)
- Height: 1,080 mm (42.5 in)
- Curb weight: 726 kg (1,601 lb)

Chronology
- Successor: De Tomaso Mangusta

The De Tomaso Vallelunga is a mid-engine sports car produced from 1964 until 1967. It was the first road going automobile manufactured by the company.

== History ==
The prototype has a backbone chassis with stressed member engine and formula car suspension in a barchetta body constructed in Modena. Named the Vallelunga 1500 after the Autodromo di Vallelunga racing circuit, it was shown by De Tomaso at the Turin Auto Show in 1963 and subsequently raced. Advertised in a prospectus as a Spider with weather equipment, Alejandro de Tomaso hoped to sell the concept to another company, but when there were no takers he commissioned Carrozzeria Fissore to build a new aluminum body on his rolling chassis. Fissore presented the resulting coupé styled by its young design chief Franco Maina at the Turin show in November 1964. As many as fifteen were built, the last few of which, unclaimed by De Tomaso, were scrapped by the coachbuilder. In 1965 production was moved to Ghia where 50 were assembled with fiberglass bodies based on Maina's design. In 1966 Ghia loaned a Vallelunga to the Museum of Modern Art in New York City for an automobile design exhibition.

== Specifications and features ==
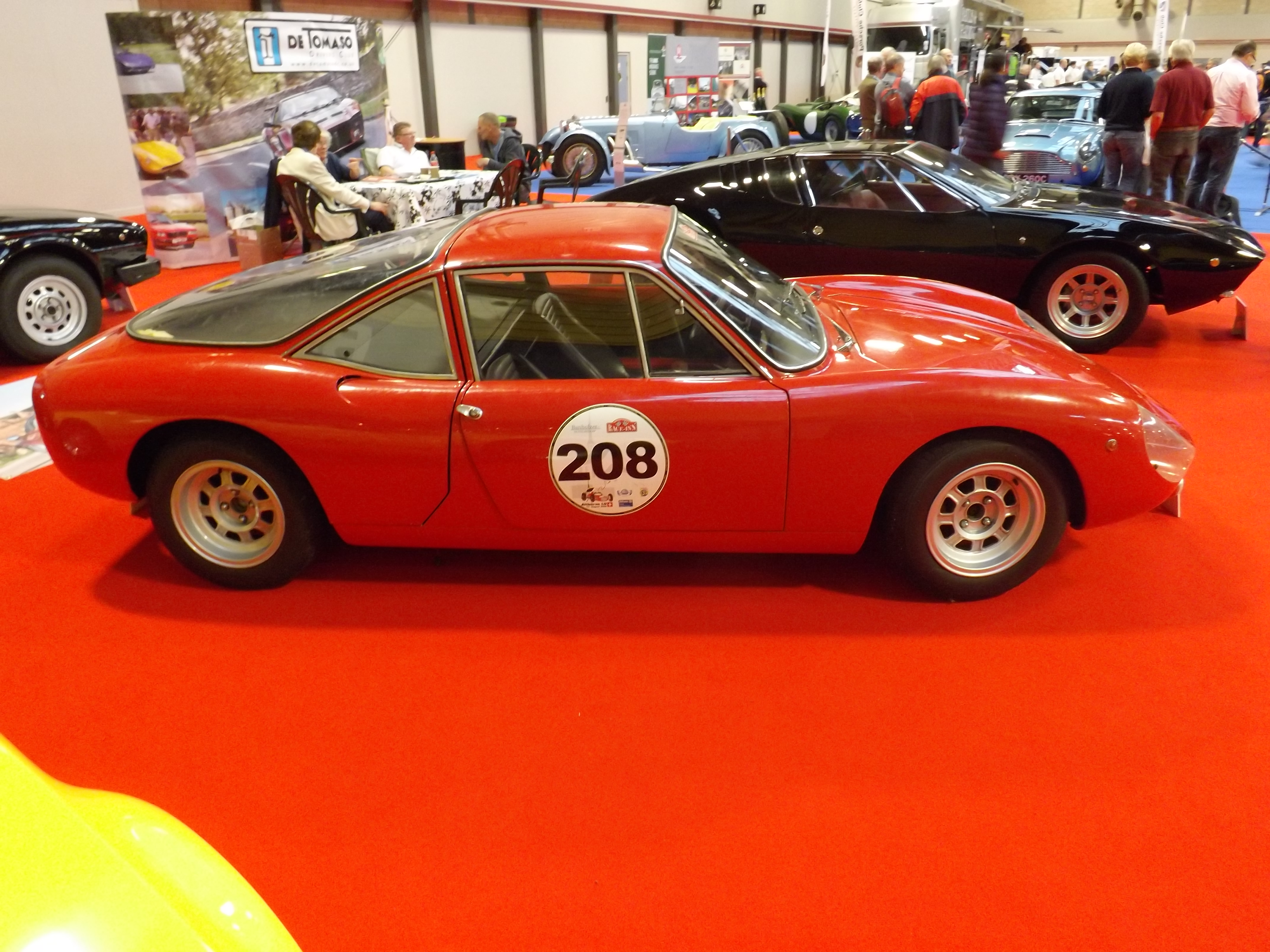
De Tomaso Fissore Vallelunga

The engine is a 1.5 L straight-4 Ford Kent from the Cortina, tuned to a power output of 104 hp (78 kW) at 6,200 rpm with twin Weber 40DCOE2 carburetors, mated to a Volkswagen Beetle transaxle. The chassis frame is a fabricated sheet and tubular steel backbone and front crossmember with the mid-mounted transmission and engine initially carrying rear suspension loads to the central beam. Tubular frame extensions were progressively added during production eventually taking all rear suspension and body loads. Suspension is racing-derived double wishbone at the front and multi-link at the rear, with front and rear anti-roll bars and concentric springs & shock absorbers. Front uprights are Standard-Triumph, rack and pinion steering is Renault, brakes are Campagnolo Amadori disc type, tires are radial 145-13 front and 175-13 rear. The small car weighs 726 kg (1,600 lb) with fiberglass body and many cast magnesium chassis components.

Engine and battery are accessed by tilting back the entire rear body section on Fissore Vallelungas. On the Ghia version the rear window hinges at the front and an upholstered panel lifts out. The rear window and headlamp covers are acrylic. The aluminum fuel tank and its filler are in the front compartment. Air leaves the front-mounted radiator beneath the car, and plumbing runs through the backbone to the engine.

== Successor ==
The Vallelunga was replaced by the Mangusta which used the concept of the Vallelunga chassis significantly re-engineered to take a Ford 302 engine, with a coupé body by Giorgetto Giugiaro.
