= Monteverdi High Speed =

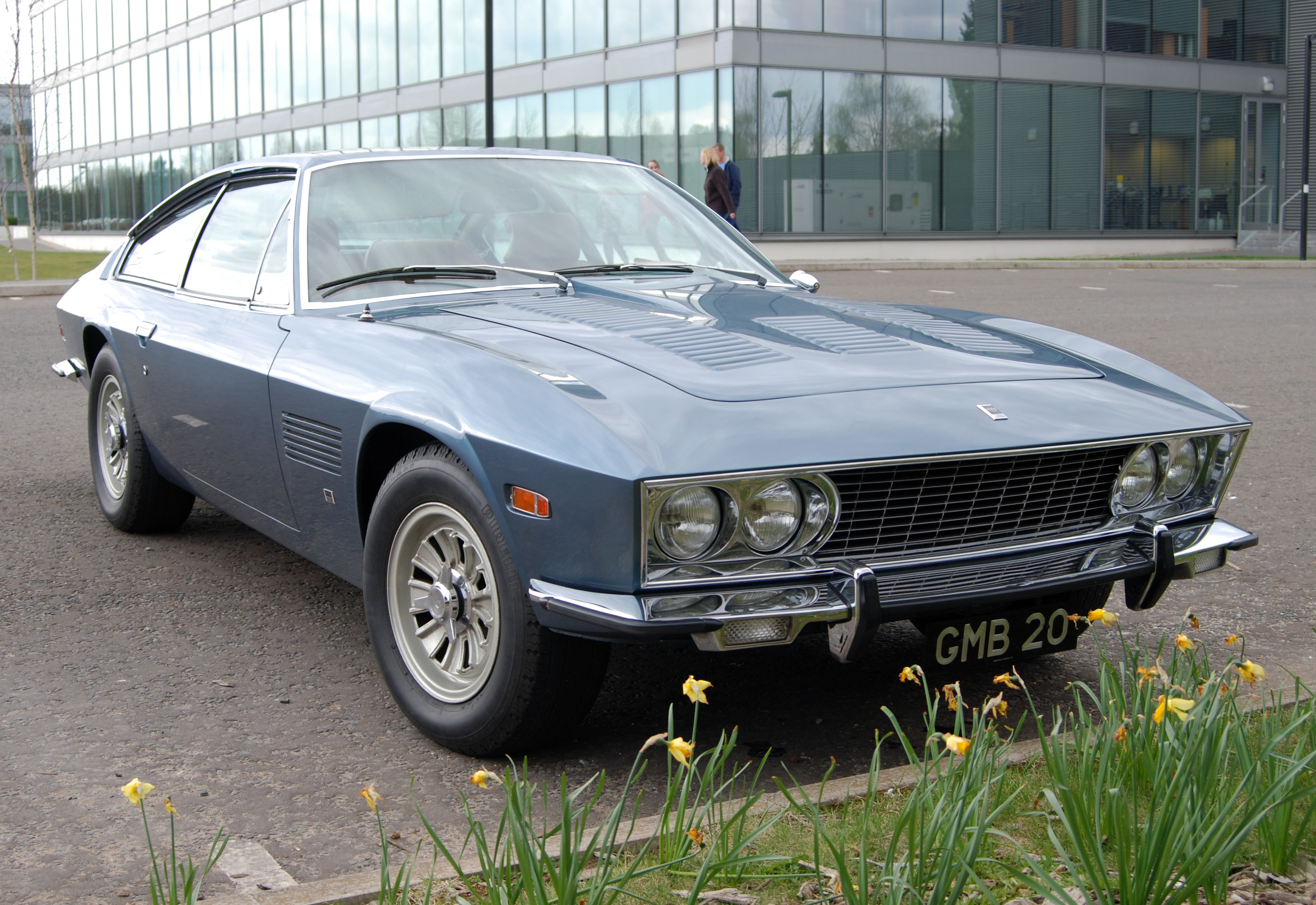
- Monteverdi 375 L with body by Carrozzeria Fissore

Overview
- Manufacturer: Monteverdi
- Also called: Monteverdi High Speed 375
- Production: 1967–1976
- Assembly: Switzerland: Basel

Body and chassis
- Class: Grand tourer
- Body style: 2-door coupé 2-door convertible 4-door saloon
- Layout: FR layout
- Related: Monteverdi Palm Beach

Powertrain
- Engine: Chrysler 7.2 L Magnum 440 V8; Chrysler 7.0 L V8
- Transmission: 3-speed TorqueFlite automatic; 4-speed A-833 manual

The Monteverdi High Speed is a series of sports cars with different bodies produced from 1967 to 1976 by Swiss automaker Monteverdi. The High Speed series included several coupe models, a convertible and a sedan. In addition, the Coupé Berlinetta and the Cabriolet Palm Beach also belong to the model family.

== Conception ==
Generally, the Monteverdi High Speed series models are described as uncomplicated technically. They were based on a box frame of square steel tubes. The design of the frame was Monteverdi's own; The chassis was manufactured by Stahlbau AG in Muttenz in the canton of Basel-Landschaft, which according to some information at least momentarily belonged to Monteverdi. The front suspension parts were made by Alford & Alder in the United Kingdom, the rear axles were by Salisbury, brakes by Girling, and the steering by ZF.

The engines used were V8 engines from Chrysler, with outputs of about 375 hp (280 kW; 380 PS) originally. The output is also the origin of the model names. However, this claimed power was in SAE Gross; the corresponding DIN values were about 35 percent lower. On the other hand, Chrysler's big-block engines, especially those made by Chrysler's Mopar components, could deliver far greater horsepower without major problems. It was also possible to specify Chrysler's slightly smaller but much more powerful Hemi engine; this was eventually made available to all High Speed models. Most cars were built with Chrysler TorqueFlite automatic transmissions, but a few had 4-speed manual transmissions.

As American manufacturers had to meet more stringent emissions standards at home, beginning at the end of the 1960s, the engines supplied to Monteverdi also became less and less powerful. By 1974, Monteverdi claimed a top speed of only 200 km/h (124 mph) for the 375 L 2+2, and in period road tests not even this always proved achievable. This from a design which had been able to reach 238 km/h (148 mph) only a few years earlier, using an engine without the emissions restrictions. Monteverdi never modified the engines for more power, limiting himself to adding a larger 7 L (1.8 US gal) oil pan and installing an oil cooler (with a transmission oil cooler added on automatic-equipped cars).

== Variants ==
Between 1967 and 1976, Monteverdi presented a variety of variants of the High Speed series of models. All of these models have been uniformly designated by the factory as High Speed 375 (denominating the engine's power in SAE gross); they carried suffixes identifying coupés on standard wheelbase, short coupés, convertibles, and sedans.

In general, two series can be distinguished. The first series, produced from 1967 to 1968, included a handful of coupés designed and built by Pietro Frua in Turin. The second, much more numerous series debuted in the summer of 1968 and ended in 1976. These are vehicles that were largely (but not exclusively) built at the Carrozzeria Fissore in Savigliano. The first vehicles bodied by Carrozzeria Fissore still used Frua's design; from 1969 there was a new, Fissore-designed body, from which various derivatives were developed.

=== The Frua models ===
==== High Speed 375 S (Frua) ====
The first model, the High Speed 375 S, was a two-seater coupé with a body designed by Pietro Frua in Turin. Some of the Monteverdi's details continued features of Frua's earlier work, with notable similarities to the Maserati Mistral and the British AC 428. Some sources claim that the similarities go so far that individual components of these cars, such as glass sections and doors, are interchangeable.

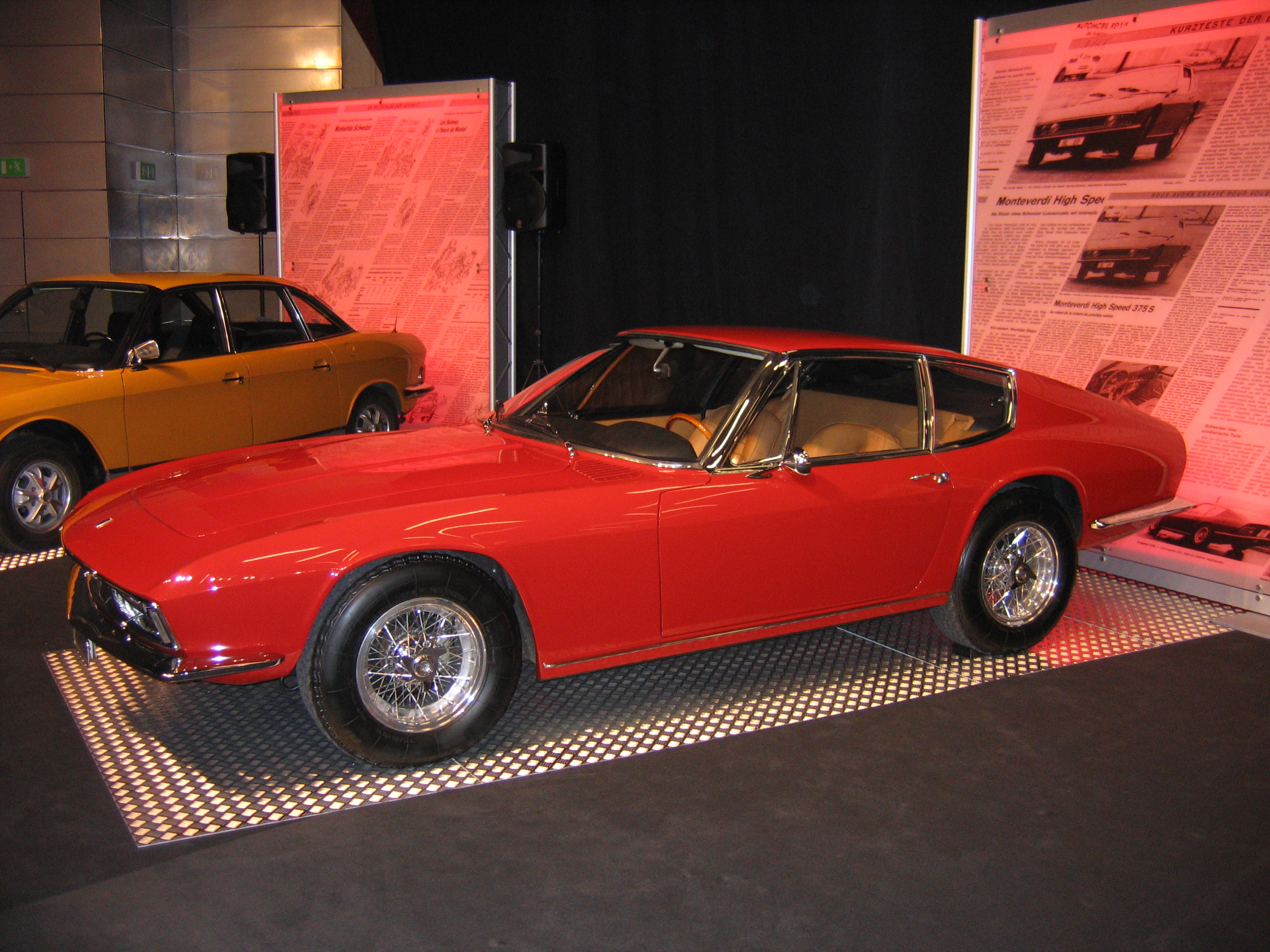
Monteverdi High Speed 375 S with Fissore body (prototype from 1967).

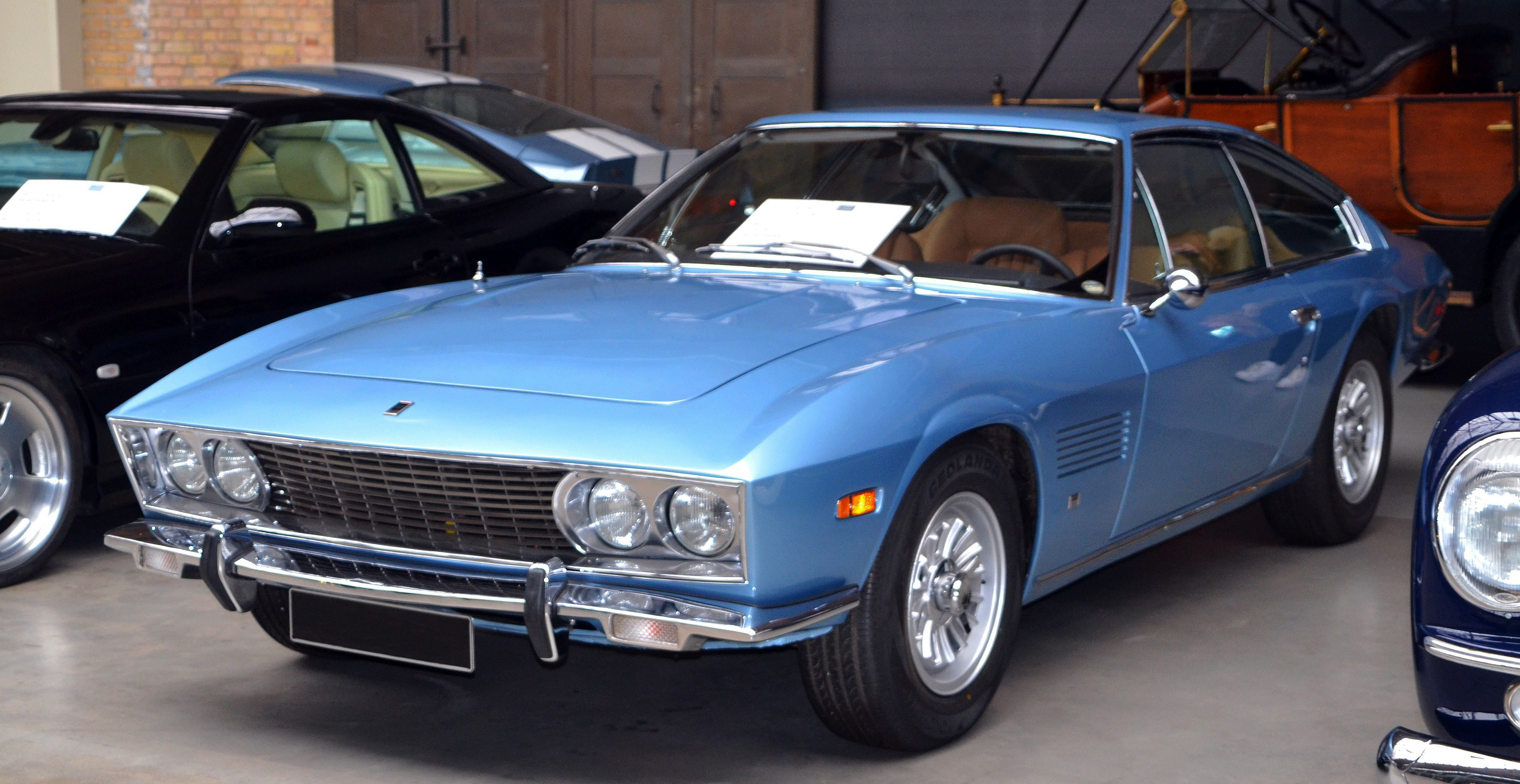
Monteverdi High Speed 375 L

The Frua-bodied High Speed 375 S was presented at the 43rd IAA in September, 1967, in the Auto Becker booth, and received very positive reviews. Zürich daily Blick referred to it as "the most beautiful shape ever seen between the Alps and the English Channel". In addition to the elegant bodywork and solid handling, the car was also lauded for its luxurious and well-finished interior. Regular production commenced in 1967 at the latest, with work shared between Switzerland and Italy. First, the workers in Monteverdi's Binningen workshop fitted the drivetrain and suspension to the chassis. The roadworthy chassis was then delivered to Turin, where Frua installed the body and finished the car. The ready-to-drive vehicle was then returned to Monteverdi to deliver to the buyer.

By this means of production, a total of twelve coupés were produced in the first six months of cooperation between Monteverdi and Frua.

==== High Speed 375 L (Frua) ====
Alongside the regular two-seater coupé, Frua developed an extended version designed as a 2+2-seater on behalf of Monteverdi. The sideline and the roof section were both significantly changed. The prototype was shown in public in 1968, but remained at Monteverdi's factory afterwards and never went on sale.

==== High Speed 400 S ====
Coinciding with the 375 S, Monteverdi announced the availability of an even more powerful model with a version of Chrysler's "Magnum" eight-cylinder with twin four-barrel carburettors, which was to provide 400 PS (294 kW; 395 hp). The car never materialized and such a model with a Frua body was never produced.

==== The end of the collaboration with Frua ====
In the spring of 1968, Peter Monteverdi considered a significant increase in annual output; Around 100 vehicles were planned per year. These numbers did not match the capacity of Atelier Frua, whose bodies were purely hand built, and who had no capacity to build such high numbers of vehicles. Frua then suggested outsourcing the production to Carrozzeria Maggiora, where some Maserati models were already built and capacities for a partially automated production existed. But Monteverdi rejected this step, because it was associated with high investments, especially for pressing tools. Instead, he was looking for another body shop that could do the purely manual production of the desired quantities. This he found in Carrozzeria Fissore in Savigliano (south of Turin), a smaller and less prestigious design studio of the northern Italian level, which in the 1960s designed the De Tomaso Vallelunga and some DKW models for the South American market.

From the summer of 1968, Monteverdi had a total of about ten bodies of Pietro Frua's design produced at Carrozzeria Fissore. At the same time Peter Monteverdi denied the payment of royalties to Frua, whereupon this Monteverdi had the use of his design prohibited by court order. Monteverdi then had to design a new body, which was available in 1969. Until then, Monteverdi could not sell off all the bodies built by Fissore in Frua style; The last of these rare models were sold off in 1973.

Pietro Frua used the basic features of the Monteverdi 375 in a modified form also in later other designs. So in 1971, he designed a fastback coupe based on the Dodge Challenger, which repeated many features of the 375. The Challenger Coupe still exists today and is regularly shown at European exhibitions.

=== The Fissore Models ===
For 1969, as a consequence of the lawsuit with Frua over unpaid royalties, Monteverdi had to design a new body for the High Speed models. Unlike before, the pure two-seater would not be the volume model; Rather, various inquiries from prospective buyers had revealed that a 2 + 2 coupe on extended chassis was preferred. Accordingly, the High Speed 375 L should be the base vehicle of the Monteverdi range. In the next eight years, the bodies were produced predominantly, but not exclusively, at Fissore in Savigliano. Other coachbuilders and workshops such as Embo S.p.A. also produced a handful of High Speed bodies.

==== Monteverdi 2000 GTI ====
The 2000 GTI study was designed as a cheaper alternative to the High Speed GT cars. The project employed BMW components and was powered by a four-cylinder, 130 PS (96 kW) engine. In order to maintain the exclusivity of the High Speed series, Peter Monteverdi decided not to build the lower priced, smaller GT coupé.

==== High Speed 375 L ====
The High Speed 375 L with Fissore body was to become the volume model of the Monteverdi product range. The new body in its proportions corresponded exactly to the Frua model, but featured an angular design at the front and rear. The front end showed strong chrome-framed double round headlights, which were later replaced by rectangular broadband headlights in a few cases. At the rear, tail lights from the Alfa Romeo Giulia Berlina were used. Who was the designer of this model is unclear. Peter Monteverdi claimed to have designed the body itself, Fissore never denied it to him. It is likely that Fissore worked out the details according to Monteverdi sketches and Monteverdi relinquished the rights to the design, as if in return for the production order.

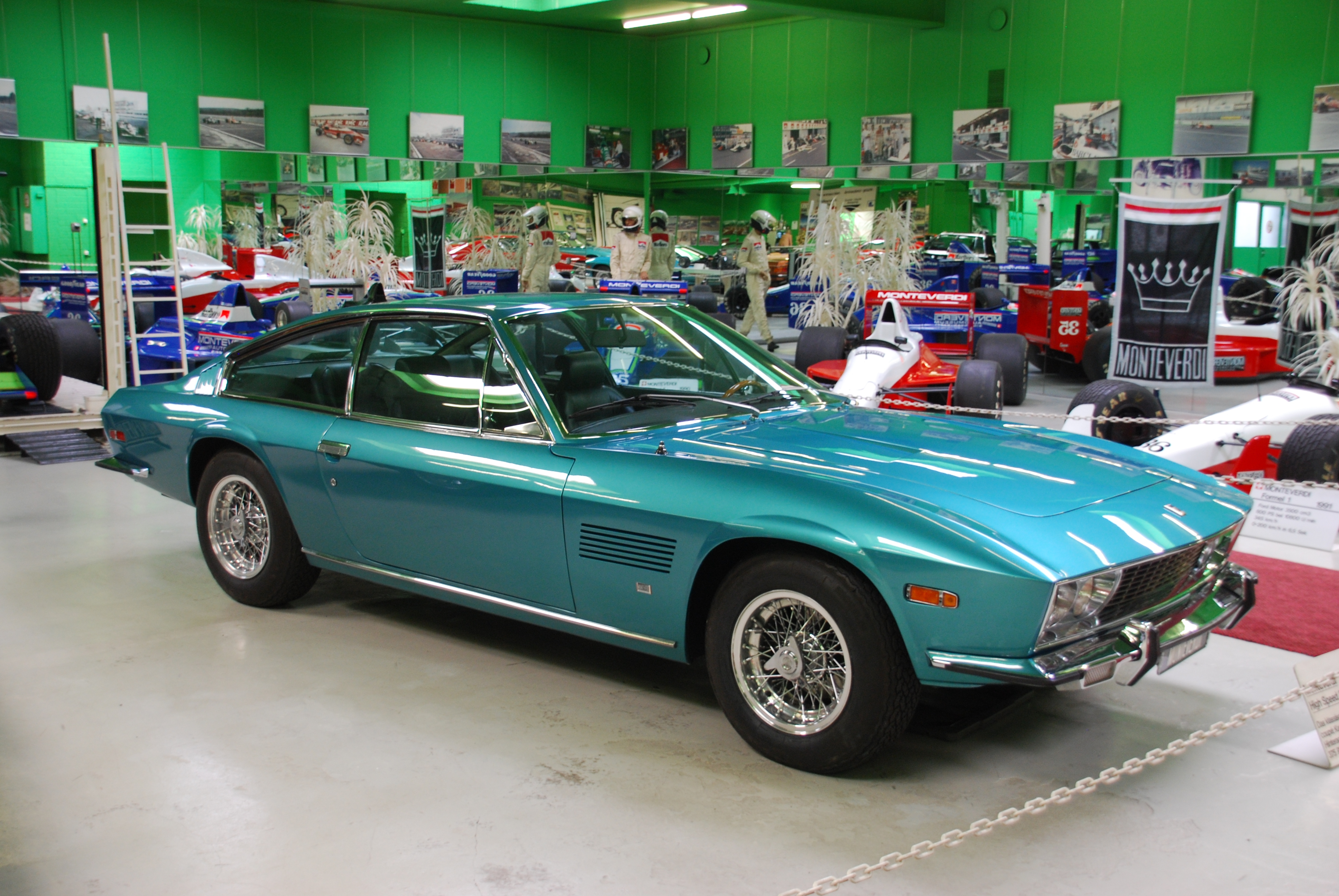
High Speed 375 L

In a sales brochure from 1972, Peter Monteverdi highlighted the style of the vehicle and the outstanding performance. In it he described the Monteverdi High Speed 375 L as "the Coupé of today with the technology of tomorrow".

The German magazine Auto Motor und Sport tested a high-speed 375 L with a 7.2-liter engine in spring, 1972 and determined the following performance:

Top speed: 229.3 km/h (142.5 mph)

0–100 km/h (0-62 mph): 8.2 seconds

1 km with standing start: 28.3 seconds.

Thus, the Monteverdi was about at the level of the British Jensen Interceptor, but did not match the performance of cars such as the Aston Martin V8 or the Maserati Indy.

During the production period, minor or major improvements or changes were continuously made to the series. The most striking of these was probably the complete redesign of the dashboard with the 1972/1973 vintage. Until then, it was more traditionally English in design, with a lot of wood and classical instruments, but from then on the Monteverdis presented themselves in a sportier style in a black velour design. Since the entire High Speed series was of handcrafted production, it can not be ruled out that Monteverdi executed detail designs to individual customer requirements. The final cars in this series were built in 1976.

==== High Speed 375 S, Berlinetta ====
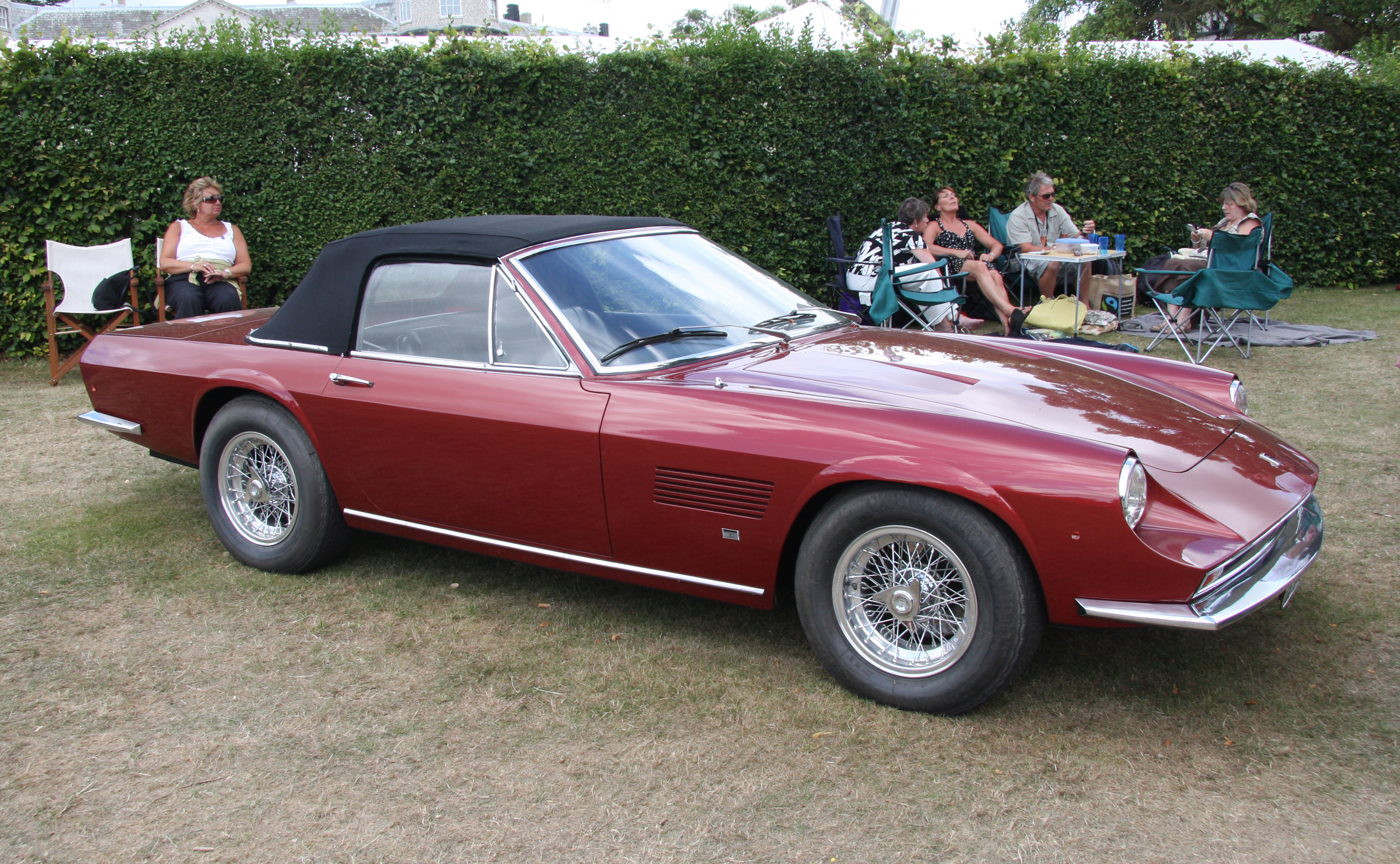
The only surviving High Speed 375 C

Alongside the 2+2-seater, Monteverdi reactivated his initially presented short chassis for another pure two-seater. This car received a bodywork that was significantly changed, with recessed headlamps and six round taillights. The two-seater with Fissore body was much less successful than the 2+2-seater type 375 L. Between 1969 and 1971, a total of six short coupés were made with Fissore bodies. Today, one of these is part of the extensive car collection of American talk show host Jay Leno.

In the winter of 1971/1972, the 375 S was further developed into the Monteverdi Berlinetta. The tubular frame has been reinforced for improved torsional resistance; The car received a new front end with a slim grille which extended across the entire width of the car. Monteverdi emphasized the increased passive safety of the Berlinetta.

==== High Speed 375 C ====
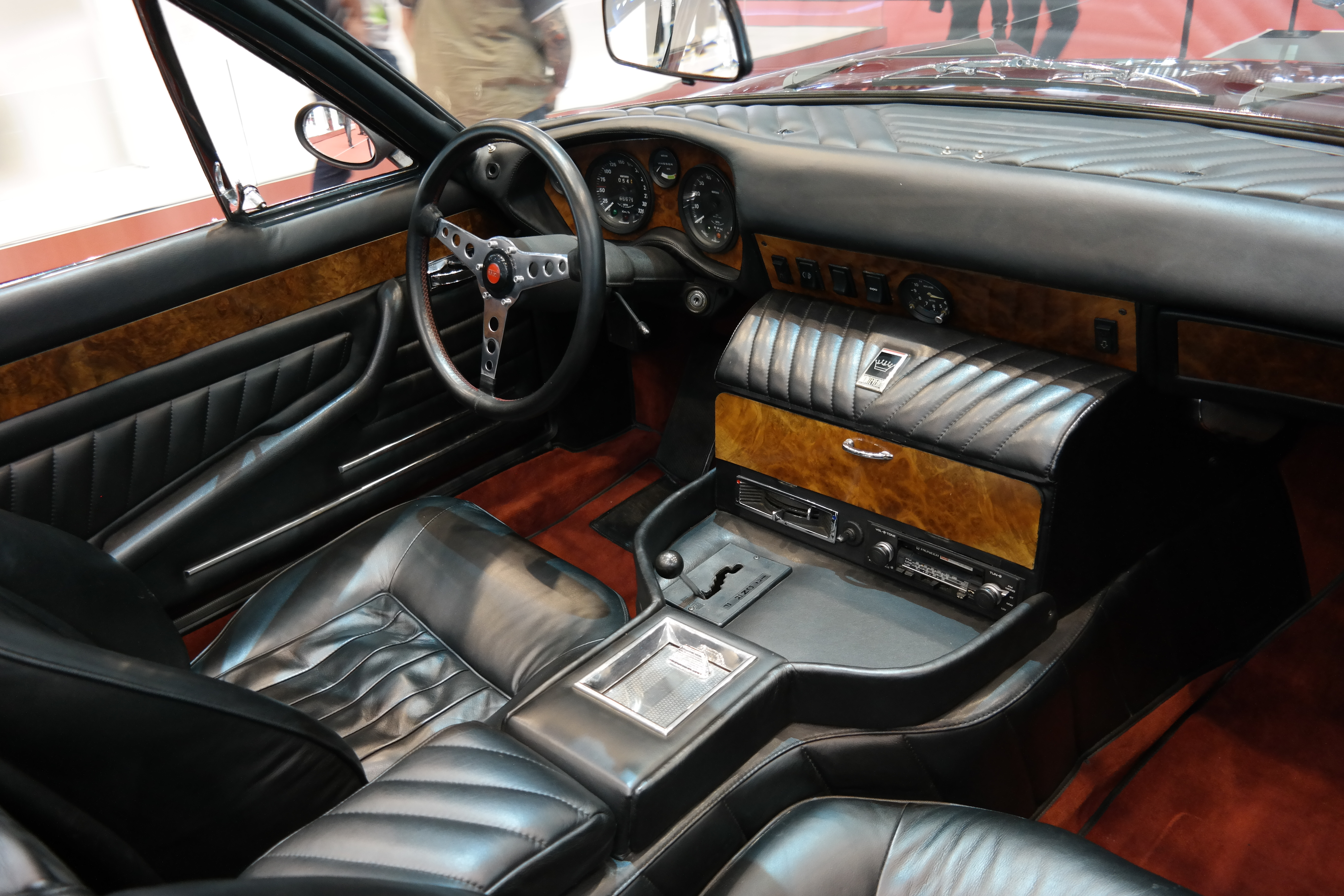
High Speed 375 C interior

In 1971, Monteverdi built a convertible version called the 375 C from the short wheelbase 375 S. Unlike the 375 S, the convertible did not have six round taillights, rather it used the tail lights from the Alfa Romeo Giulia, as did the 375 L 2+2.

The 375 C, painted yellow, was presented to the public at the 1971 Geneva Motor Show. The purchase price was given there as 75,750 Swiss francs. Overall, only two copies were made: One was sold to a client, while the second copy remained at the factory. In 1974, the second car was converted to the Monteverdi Palm Beach convertible, using body parts from the Monteverdi Berlinetta. Later, Monteverdi bought back the other 375 C; this car was shown in Monteverdi's Automobile Museum and was occasionally shown at exhibitions.

==== High Speed 375/4 ====
The culmination of the High Speed series was a large four-door sedan called the 375/4 which first appeared in 1971.

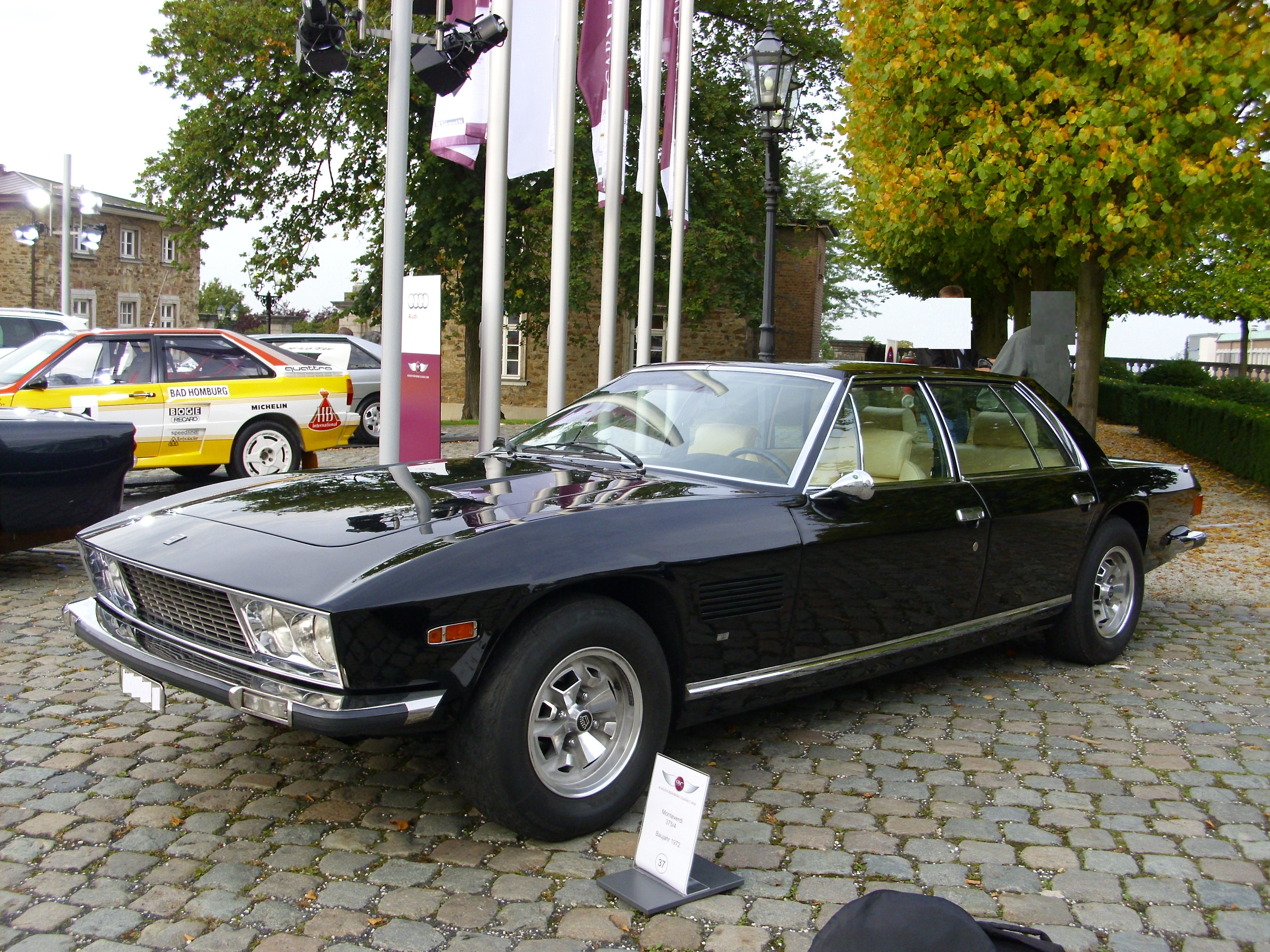
High Speed 375/4

The wheelbase of the vehicle was extended to 3.15 meters, while the key technical data - particularly the driveline - remained unchanged. The 375 L front end was retained until the A-pillar, followed by four wide-opening doors (with door handles from the Fiat 128), and a sharply drawn roof section. The belt line was largely horizontal, carried through to the long trunk. The interior was fully upholstered in leather and equipped with air conditioning, power windows, and on request a Sony TV and a bar. The car could be used as a chauffeured limousine, with several copies delivered with a partition between the driver and passenger compartments. External details were repeatedly modified, sometimes to meet the ever changing regulatory landscape of the 1970s and sometimes in response to customer requests. One late model, for example, was delivered with single rectangular headlamps borrowed from the Ford Granada, a matte black radiator grille, and rubber-covered bumpers.

The tail lights were originally from the Alfa Romeo Giulia, as on the 375 L 2+2, but later these were replaced by Triumph TR6 units. Those lights had first been used by Monteverdi for the 1972 Berlinetta, and gave the sedan a more modern appearance.

== Literature ==
=== Newspapers and Magazines ===
- Automobil Revue year books 1968, 1969, 1973, 1974 (technical specifications and annual changes)
- "Alpentraum" [Alpine Dream]. Auto Motor und Sport (in German). No. 12/1972. 1972-06-10. p. 140.
- Leyrer, Götz (1978-06-21). "Kunsthandwerk" [Artisan Crafts]. Auto Motor und Sport (in German). No. 13/1978. pp. 8–11.
- "Mit dem Monteverdi durch die Weinberge" [Through wine country in a Monteverdi]. Auto Motor und Sport (in German). No. 25/1996. 1996-11-29. p. 208.
- Wieland, Bernd (January 2003). "Schwarz-Brenner" [Black Burner]. Motor Klassik (in German). No. 1/2003. pp. 52 ff.
- Siegenthaler, Mark; Schulze, Marco (April 2008). "Mit harter Hand und großem Herz, das Leben und Wirken des Peter Monteverdi" [With a firm hand a big heart: the life and works of Peter Monteverdi]. Swiss Car Classics. No. 20.
- Scorah, Rob. "The full Monte". Classic Cars. No. 2/2013. pp. 58 ff.
