= Bulatovo =

Bulatovo (Russian: Булатово) is the name of several rural localities in Russia:

- Bulatovo, Altai Krai, a selo in Kuyagansky Selsoviet of Altaysky District of Altai Krai
- Bulatovo, Arkhangelsk Oblast, a settlement in Yarnemsky Selsoviet of Plesetsky District of Arkhangelsk Oblast
- Bulatovo, Abzelilovsky District, Republic of Bashkortostan, a village in Almukhametovsky Selsoviet of Abzelilovsky District of the Republic of Bashkortostan
- Bulatovo, Blagoveshchensky District, Republic of Bashkortostan, a village in Sanninsky Selsoviet of Blagoveshchensky District of the Republic of Bashkortostan
- Bulatovo, Chelyabinsk Oblast, a village in Sokolovsky Selsoviet of Uysky District of Chelyabinsk Oblast
- Bulatovo, Chuvash Republic, a village in Koltsovskoye Rural Settlement of Vurnarsky District of the Chuvash Republic
- Bulatovo, Iznoskovsky District, Kaluga Oblast, a village in Iznoskovsky District, Kaluga Oblast
- Bulatovo, Kozelsky District, Kaluga Oblast, a selo in Kozelsky District, Kaluga Oblast
- Bulatovo, Kirov Oblast, a village in Kaysky Rural Okrug of Verkhnekamsky District of Kirov Oblast
- Bulatovo, Kostroma Oblast, a village in Vorobyevitskoye Settlement of Vokhomsky District of Kostroma Oblast
- Bulatovo, Krasnoyarsk Krai, a village in Chaykovsky Selsoviet of Bogotolsky District of Krasnoyarsk Krai
- Bulatovo, Moscow Oblast, a village in Dubrovitskoye Rural Settlement of Podolsky District of Moscow Oblast
- Bulatovo, Novosibirsk Oblast, a selo in Kuybyshevsky District of Novosibirsk Oblast
- Bulatovo, Alexandrovsky District, Perm Krai, a village under the administrative jurisdiction of the city of krai significance of Alexandrovsk in Perm Krai
- Bulatovo, Krasnovishersky District, Perm Krai, a settlement in Krasnovishersky District, Perm Krai
- Bulatovo, Pskov Oblast, a village in Pskovsky District of Pskov Oblast
- Bulatovo, Republic of Tatarstan, a village in Zelenodolsky District of the Republic of Tatarstan
- Bulatovo, Kashinsky District, Tver Oblast, a village in Bulatovskoye Rural Settlement of Kashinsky District of Tver Oblast
- Bulatovo, Rzhevsky District, Tver Oblast, a village in Itomlya Rural Settlement of Rzhevsky District of Tver Oblast
- Bulatovo, Selizharovsky District, Tver Oblast, a village in Dmitrovskoye Rural Settlement of Selizharovsky District of Tver Oblast
- Bulatovo, Zharkovsky District, Tver Oblast, a village in Novoselkovskoye Rural Settlement of Zharkovsky District of Tver Oblast
- Bulatovo, Vologda Oblast, a village in Domshinsky Selsoviet of Sheksninsky District of Vologda Oblast
- Bulatovo, Danilovsky District, Yaroslavl Oblast, a village in Danilovsky Rural Okrug of Danilovsky District of Yaroslavl Oblast
- Bulatovo, Rostovsky District, Yaroslavl Oblast, a village in Perovsky Rural Okrug of Rostovsky District of Yaroslavl Oblast
