= Danilovka =

Danilovka (Russian: Дани́ловка) is the name of several inhabited localities in Russia.

== Modern inhabited localities ==
=== Altai Krai ===
As of 2010, two rural localities in Altai Krai bear this name:

- Danilovka, Slavgorod, Altai Krai, a selo under the administrative jurisdiction of the town of krai significance of Slavgorod
- Danilovka, Altaysky District, Altai Krai, a settlement in Starobelokurikhinsky Selsoviet of Altaysky District

=== Republic of Bashkortostan ===
As of 2010, one rural locality in the Republic of Bashkortostan bears this name:

- Danilovka, Republic of Bashkortostan, a village in Korneyevsky Selsoviet of Meleuzovsky District

=== Bryansk Oblast ===
As of 2010, three rural localities in Bryansk Oblast bear this name:

- Danilovka, Gordeyevsky District, Bryansk Oblast, a village in Kazarichsky Selsoviet of Gordeyevsky District
- Danilovka, Kolyudovsky Selsoviet, Krasnogorsky District, Bryansk Oblast, a settlement in Kolyudovsky Selsoviet of Krasnogorsky District
- Danilovka, Krasnaya Gora Settlement Council, Krasnogorsky District, Bryansk Oblast, a settlement under the administrative jurisdiction of Krasnaya Gora Settlement Council of Krasnogorsky District

=== Jewish Autonomous Oblast ===
As of 2010, one rural locality in the Jewish Autonomous Oblast bears this name:

- Danilovka, Jewish Autonomous Oblast, a selo in Smidovichsky District

=== Kaluga Oblast ===
As of 2010, two rural localities in Kaluga Oblast bear this name:

- Danilovka, Iznoskovsky District, Kaluga Oblast, a village in Iznoskovsky District
- Danilovka, Meshchovsky District, Kaluga Oblast, a village in Meshchovsky District

=== Kemerovo Oblast ===
As of 2010, one rural locality in Kemerovo Oblast bears this name:

- Danilovka, Kemerovo Oblast, a selo in Stupishinskaya Rural Territory of Tyazhinsky District

=== Kirov Oblast ===
As of 2010, two rural localities in Kirov Oblast bear this name:

- Danilovka, Murashinsky District, Kirov Oblast, a village in Bezbozhnikovsky Rural Okrug of Murashinsky District
- Danilovka, Orlovsky District, Kirov Oblast, a village in Podgorodny Rural Okrug of Orlovsky District

=== Komi Republic ===
As of 2010, one rural locality in the Komi Republic bears this name:

- Danilovka, Komi Republic, a village in Priuralskoye Selo Administrative Territory of city of republic significance of Pechora

=== Lipetsk Oblast ===
As of 2010, one rural locality in Lipetsk Oblast bears this name:

- Danilovka, Lipetsk Oblast, a village in Uritsky Selsoviet of Terbunsky District

=== Republic of Mordovia ===
As of 2010, one rural locality in the Republic of Mordovia bears this name:

- Danilovka, Republic of Mordovia, a settlement in Kargashinsky Selsoviet of Zubovo-Polyansky District

=== Moscow Oblast ===
As of 2010, one rural locality in Moscow Oblast bears this name:

- Danilovka, Moscow Oblast, a village in Ramenskoye Rural Settlement of Shakhovskoy District

=== Orenburg Oblast ===
As of 2010, two rural localities in Orenburg Oblast bear this name:

- Danilovka, Abdulinsky District, Orenburg Oblast, a settlement in Nizhnekurmeysky Selsoviet of Abdulinsky District
- Danilovka, Kurmanayevsky District, Orenburg Oblast, a selo in Volzhsky Selsoviet of Kurmanayevsky District

=== Oryol Oblast ===
As of 2010, two rural localities in Oryol Oblast bear this name:

- Danilovka, Kolpnyansky District, Oryol Oblast, a village in Karlovsky Selsoviet of Kolpnyansky District
- Danilovka, Pokrovsky District, Oryol Oblast, a village in Danilovsky Selsoviet of Pokrovsky District

=== Penza Oblast ===
As of 2010, one rural locality in Penza Oblast bears this name:

- Danilovka, Penza Oblast, a selo in Danilovsky Selsoviet of Lopatinsky District

=== Primorsky Krai ===
As of 2010, one rural locality in Primorsky Krai bears this name:

- Danilovka, Primorsky Krai, a selo in Mikhaylovsky District

=== Ryazan Oblast ===
As of 2010, two rural localities in Ryazan Oblast bear this name:

- Danilovka, Ryazansky District, Ryazan Oblast, a village in Mushkovatovsky Rural Okrug of Ryazansky District
- Danilovka, Shatsky District, Ryazan Oblast, a village in Shevyrlyayevsky Rural Okrug of Shatsky District

=== Saratov Oblast ===
As of 2010, three rural localities in Saratov Oblast bear this name:

- Danilovka, Atkarsky District, Saratov Oblast, a selo in Atkarsky District
- Danilovka, Krasnoarmeysky District, Saratov Oblast, a selo in Krasnoarmeysky District
- Danilovka, Perelyubsky District, Saratov Oblast, a village in Perelyubsky District

=== Smolensk Oblast ===
As of 2010, one rural locality in Smolensk Oblast bears this name:

- Danilovka, Krasninsky District, Smolensk Oblast, a village in Mankovskoye Rural Settlement of Krasninsky District

=== Tambov Oblast ===
As of 2010, one rural locality in Tambov Oblast bears this name:

- Danilovka, Tambov Oblast, a village in Vorontsovsky Selsoviet of Znamensky District

=== Tula Oblast ===
As of 2010, three rural localities in Tula Oblast bear this name:

- Danilovka, Aleksinsky District, Tula Oblast, a village in Spas-Koninsky Rural Okrug of Aleksinsky District
- Danilovka, Kurkinsky District, Tula Oblast, a village in Ivanovskaya Volost of Kurkinsky District
- Danilovka, Shchyokinsky District, Tula Oblast, a village in Danilovskaya Rural Administration of Shchyokinsky District

=== Vladimir Oblast ===
As of 2010, two rural localities in Vladimir Oblast bear this name:

- Danilovka, Sobinsky District, Vladimir Oblast, a village in Sobinsky District
- Danilovka, Sudogodsky District, Vladimir Oblast, a village in Sudogodsky District

=== Volgograd Oblast ===
As of 2010, one urban locality in Volgograd Oblast bears this name:

- Danilovka, Volgograd Oblast, a work settlement in Danilovsky District

=== Yaroslavl Oblast ===
As of 2010, one rural locality in Yaroslavl Oblast bears this name:

- Danilovka, Yaroslavl Oblast, a village in Zayachye-Kholmsky Rural Okrug of Gavrilov-Yamsky District

== Abolished inhabited localities ==
- Danilovka, Roslavlsky District, Smolensk Oblast, a village in Kostyrevskoye Rural Settlement of Roslavlsky District of Smolensk Oblast; abolished in November 2009
