= The Togliattiazot affair =

Togliattiazot Affair
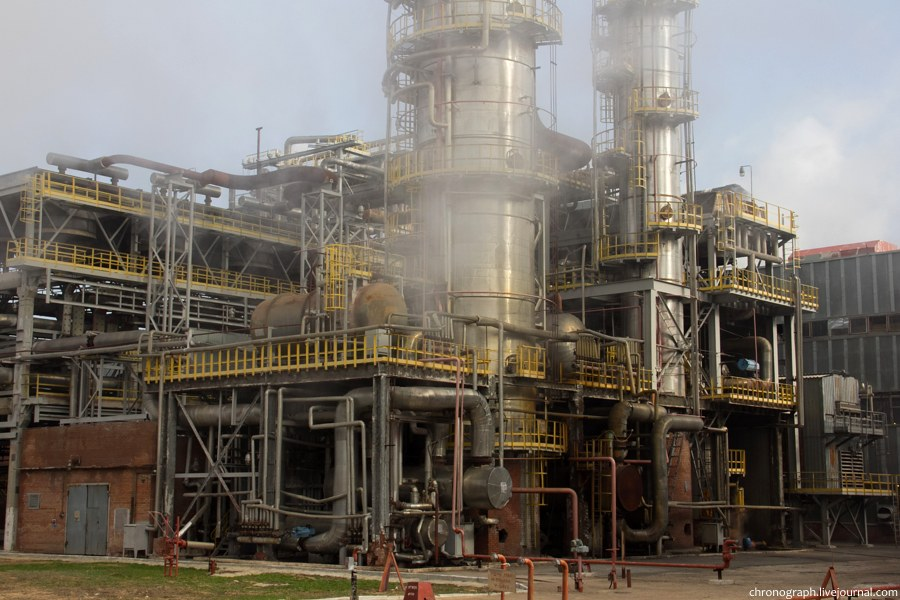
- Court: Togliatti, Samara and Moscow
- Decided: July 2019
- Verdict: Five people convicted for fraud and misappropriation

The Togliattiazot Affair is a series of events connected to criminal proceedings against the owners and executives of the Russian firm Togliattiazot (Toaz) and their foreign partners. The case spanned 14 years, from 2005 to 2019, and resulted in the owners and executives receiving prison sentences of between 8.5 and 9 years. The activity of the involved parties was described as "a threat to [Russia’s] economic activity" by the Chairman of the Investigative Committee of the Russian Federation, Alexander Bastrykin.

Togliattiazot is the largest ammonia producer in Russia, with an estimated global market share of 7.6%.

== Case background ==
=== Privatization of Togliattiazot and Transammiak pipeline ===
In 1985, Vladimir Nikolaevich Makhlai was appointed director of Toaz Industrial Group in Togliatti. The plant was built according to the project and with the money of American businessman Armand Hammer and his company Oxydental Petroleum. The production was export-oriented and connected by a pipeline with a length of about 2500 kilometers to the Odessa Port Plant, which ensures the transshipment of ammonia to tankers. The plant supplied ammonia to Oxydental Petroleum until 1997.

On July 4, 1991, the Law of the RSFSR "On Privatization of state and municipal enterprises in the RSFSR" was adopted. On December 29, 1991, the Decree of the President of the Russian Federation No. 341 was signed, approving "The main provisions of the program of privatization of state and municipal enterprises for 1992".

In 1992, the Toaz plant became an open joint-stock company. Alexander Makarov, who was then deputy chairman of Samara Regional Property Committee, helped Vladimir Makhlai with the firm's privatization. Makarov was subsequently appointed director of economics at Togliattiazot and went on to become Toaz Corporation vice-president. He was indicted alongside Makhlai and other defendants in the case.

In 1995, the privatization of the Russian part of the Transammiak ammonia pipeline was announced. The Russian Ministry of Property transferred 51% of the newly created Transammiak pipeline operator to Toaz. In turn, Togliattiazot transferred 6.1% of its own shares to the Ministry. The 6.1% Toaz stake was subsequently sold by Samara Property Fund to the Tafko company in an investment tender. Tafko then re-sold the stake to three Swiss entities that had Andrey Makhlai, Vladimir Makhlai's eldest son, as board members. In January 1997, Tafko acquired an additional 30% in Transammiak.

A condition of the investment agreement under which 51% of Transammiak was handed over, stipulated that other ammonia producers would be able to tap into the pipeline. Initially, the pipeline design allowed for ammonia producers from Nevinnomyssk, Novomoskovsk and Rossosh to tap into it. Breach of this condition later led to institution of criminal investigation. By the early 2000s, the majority of Togliattiazot and the pipeline was controlled by Vladimir Makhlai.

=== 1999 Russian Federal Property Fund investigation ===
In 1999, the Russian Federal Property Fund (RFPF) conducted an inquiry into the implementation of the Transammiak investment program and the purchase of Togliattiazot shares by Tafko. The investigation revealed that although the pipeline was upgraded, the branch lines for other producers were never built, and the purchase of the 6.1% stake in Togliattiazot had been a sham transaction. These violations prompted the RFPF to file a claim to Samara Regional Arbitration Court seeking to return the stake to public ownership.

In 2002, due to the breach of the investment agreement that allowed other ammonia producers tapping into the pipeline, Minudobrenia appealed the Ministry for Anti-monopoly Policy (AMP), which deemed the actions of Togliattiazot illegal. AMP minister Ilya Yuzhanov at the time dubbed Togliattiazot and Transammiak to be "among the worst violators of antitrust law." Toaz appealed but was shot down that same year.

In January 2003, Moscow Arbitration Court sustained Minudobrenia's claim against Togliattiazot and Transammiak, and ordered both to allow their competitors access to pipeline.

In 2004, the AMP filed a formal complaint to the Prosecutor General’s office asking to institute criminal proceedings against Togliattiazot for breaking anti-monopoly laws. The Prosecutor General's office opened a criminal case for the breach of anti-monopoly laws two months later.

== The Togliattiazot affair ==
=== 2005-2010 ===
==== Makhlai and Makarov ====
On 29 June 2005, the Investigative Committee of the Ministry of Internal Affairs (MIA) opened a criminal investigation into Vladimir Makhlai, who was charged with large-scale fraud. The investigators deemed that Makhlai committed fraud by acquiring a 6.1% stake in Togliattiazot without implementing the investment agreement, thereby causing damages of 3.2 billion rubles to the government. The Investigative Committee also charged Vladimir Makhlai and Toaz manager Alexander Makarov with large-scale tax evasion. According to the investigators, Makarov made a deal with the Swiss firm Nitrochem Distribution AG to ship Togliattiazot output at prices 20% below average world prices. Between 2001 and 2003, Toaz shipped 14.4 billion rubles worth of product to Nitrochem Distribution AG. As a result, the enterprise's returns were slashed by 1.2 billion rubles, and the state lost 280 million rubles in taxes.

In April 2005, Tverskoy District Court issued a pre-trial detention warrant for Vladimir Makhlai. However, because the whereabouts of the suspects were unknown at the time, Vladimir Makhlai and Alexander Makarov were put on federal and international wanted lists. In August 2005, Makhlai fled to Switzerland and later settled in the UK. Makarov soon followed him. Makhlai continued to manage the company from his office in London through video calls. Between 2005 and 2006, police searches of the Togliattiazot, Togliattikhimbank and Togliatti branch of Volzhsko-Uralosibirsky Registrator resulted in new charges against Makhlai and Makarov. Kommersant newspaper reported that the new charges were linked to money-laundering.

On 3 October 2007, Avtozavodsky District Court of Togliatti ruled the 2005 tax evasion case against Makhlai illegal, arguing his actions did not constitute a criminal offense. In March 2008, the Samara Regional Court upheld the ruling. The charges against both Makhlai and Makarov were subsequently dropped by the MIA.

==== Togliattiazot share sale agreement ====
On 22 December 2005, the Presidium of Russia's High Arbitration Court reversed a previous ruling of Povolzhsky Okrug Arbitration Court, which had declared the Togliattiazot share sale agreement void. Arguments of the Russian Federal Property Fund, who was the plaintiff, were deemed to be without merit.

The case was returned for retrial to Samara Regional Arbitration Court, which in May 2006 declared void the 6.1% stake sale in Togliattiazot to the Russian-Swiss firm Tafko, an entity allegedly close to the Toaz owner Vladimir Makhlai. Originally filed by the Federal Property Management Agency, it argued that Tafko had breached the investment agreement by investing merely 42% of the amount provided under the agreement. Most of the funding had been provided by Togliattiazot, and the plant bought out the stake just several months after the investment tender.

The court ordered Tafko to return the stake to the government. However, business observers believed that fulfilling it was impossible, given that Tafko was no longer in possession of the shares in question, as they were probably transferred to one of the Vladimir Makhlai-controlled offshore entities.

In July 2006, in a lawsuit filed by Federal Property Management Agency, Samara Regional Arbitration Court ruled the deal in which 6.1% in Togliattiazot was exchanged for 51% in Transammiak void. Togliattiazot was ordered to return the 51% Transammiak stake to the government, because the Federal Property Management Agency argued that a 51% stake in Transammiak was not worth 6.1% of Togliattiazot, but rather 22.9%, and therefore the exchange was declared unequal. Togliattiazot had previously attempted to prove that it did not own Transammiak shares, but the proof was never presented and the case dismissed. The ruling was reversed in 2007 by the Supreme Arbitration Court.

On 30 September 2008, the Russian Supreme Arbitration Court declared the privatization of Transammiak legal, thereby dismissing the lawsuit filed by Federal Property Management Agency. In December 2009, the Saratov Arbitration Court of Appeal dismissed the claim filed by the Federal Property Management Agency seeking to declare privatization of 6.1% of Togliattiazot shares illegal. Thus, the privatization of 6.1% of shares was declared legal after being heard four times since 2004.

==== Tringal Equities ====
Togliattiazot minority shareholder Tringal Equities sued the company board in 2006, and in 2007 for seeking $84 million in damages to offset the losses incurred by fraudulent export pricing policies. Toaz believed that the lawsuit was intended to seize company assets in a "raider-attack", to which Toaz had been subjected before, and argued that "the lawsuit filed by the minority shareholder…is meant to destabilize the enterprise’s operations." However, both suits were dismissed.

==== Resignation of Vladimir Makhlai from Toaz ====
In 2011, after the cases were dismissed, Vladimir Makhlai resigned from all executive positions at Toaz. Evgeny Korolev, who had previously worked as executive director, was appointed Togliattiazot CEO. Vladimir Makhlai's son Sergei became the chairman of the board.

==== Claims by the Federal Tax Service Directorate ====
In March 2007, the Federal Tax Service Directorate (FTSD) for the Samara Region claimed that Toaz was liable for 658 million rubles in back taxes for 2003 after a repeat tax audit. Toaz representatives denied these claims and considered most arguments mentioned by FTSD baseless.

In August that same year, Toaz faced new tax claims from the FTSD for 2004 to the tune of 2.582 billion rubles, which the company dismissed as an attempt to destabilize the plant.

All of the tax agency's claims were ruled invalid by a Togliatti court in 2007, as well as Samara Regional Arbitration Court in 2008.

==== Conflict between Uralchem and Toaz ====
In June 2008, Renova Group announced the sale of its 7.5% stake in Togliattiazot to Uralchem. Vladimir Makhlai, the Toaz majority owner, also expressed interest in buying the Renova stake, but Uralchem offered the better price. By 2011, Uralchem had increased its minority stake to 9.73% and later to 9.97%.

After acquiring a stake in Toaz, Uralchem requested a number of corporate documents relating to operations and governance, but the requests were ignored. Uralchem subsequently went to court requesting the documents confirming the ownership rights, annual meeting of shareholders minutes and branch regulations. In 2008 alone, Uralchem sued Togliattiazot 17 times. From 2009 to 2013, Togliattiazot was disciplined more than 20 times for denying a shareholder access to documents, and fined a total of 11.5 million rubles.

In 2011, Uralchem filed a criminal complaint against Toaz CEO Evgeny Korolev. The move was prompted by Korolev's refusal to provide documents pertaining to extraordinary general meetings, and the sales to Nitrochem Distribution AG at an understated price, which, according to Uralchem, caused damage to the plant and its shareholders. In Uralchem's opinion, the plant's profit was understated by $200 million. Also in 2011, Uralchem tried to sell its Toaz shares, but the deal never materialized due to Togliattiazot's failure to provide information about the shareholders. Uralchem had to pay a cancellation fee of $1 million for the collapse of the deal.

=== 2012-2019 ===
==== Violation of the legislation on joint stock companies ====
On 10 February 2012, criminal proceedings began over Uralchem's complaint in connection to Toaz's refusal to grant a minority shareholder access to the documents. According to Uralchem, by blocking the access to the documents, Toaz tried to conceal the real damages of its business practices from the shareholders. In March 2012, the court declared the criminal proceedings over shareholders’ rights violation legally valid. Togliattiazot attempted to overturn the decision but its appeal was dismissed. A month later, the Russian Investigative Committee searched the plant office, Togliattikhimbank and the Samara branch of VTB-Registrator.

==== Large-scale fraud allegations and investigation ====
In December 2012, Gazeta.ru reported that the Samara office of the Investigative Committee revealed a $550 million fraud scheme at Togliattiazot, and an investigation was launched against unknown. The case was opened over the sales to Nitrochem Distribution AG, affiliated with the Toaz majority owners, at below-market prices, which subsequently re-sold it at market prices. According to the investigators, shareholders were deprived of a significant part of dividends, with Uralchem incurring $550 million in damages and the government receiving fewer taxes than it was due.

In January 2013, Uralchem asked to open a criminal investigation against the Toaz management and owners for committing fraud as an organized group. The allegations included the illegal withdrawal of assets from the plant. Uralchem accused the Toaz management of selling the methanol facility to Tomet LLC (which produced 400 tons of methanol a year) for a price below its actual worth. The facility and the land surrounding it was sold for 130.39 million and 2.06 million rubles respectively, all without obtaining shareholder approval. Uralchem claimed that an identical facility launched at another Russian plant cost 13.54 billion rubles.

==== Toaz management trials in absentia ====
In April that year, Toaz CEO Evgeny Korolev was put on an international wanted list for his role in organized fraud. Korolev was also accused of illegal asset withdrawal in 2014, as he had signed the sale contract for the methanol production facility. The damage from the actions of Korolev amounted to about $ 400 million. He was subsequently trialed in absentia.

On 23 December 2014, Basmanny District Court of Moscow issued an arrest warrant in absentia for Sergei Makhlai. He was accused of setting up a scheme for sale of the plant's product at below market value and siphoning funds off to offshore entities. In November, Sergei Makhlai, who resides in the US and has dual citizenship, was indicted in absentia.

A day later, on 24 December 2014, the owner of Swiss companies Ameropa AG and Nitrochem Distribution AG, Andreas Zivy, who was also on the international wanted list, was arrested in absentia on charges of fraud amounting to about $400 million. This was followed on 25 December by the arrest of main owner of Togliattiazot, Vladimir Makhlai, on charges of $550 million fraud.

On 26 December 2014, Nitrochem Distribution AG director Beat Ruprecht was arrested for misappropriating Togliattiazot products worth $3 billion.

==== Forming an organized criminal community and illegal appropriation of profit ====
On 16 May 2019, the Investigative Committee of Russia opened the criminal case regarding embezzlement at Toaz amounting to 85 billion rubles. Later that month, as part of the investigation, Togliattikhimbank chairman Alexander Popov was apprehended while attempting to flee Russia and later charged with creation of a criminal organization which used illicit financial schemes through Togliattikhimbank to conceal money laundering.

According to the investigators, the defendants constituted a criminal organization established and led by Vladimir Makhlai since 1997. The suspects named in the case included Vladimir Makhlai, Sergei Makhlai, Alexander Popov, Evgeny Korolev, Alexey Vinogradov, Olga Kamasheva, Alexey Mizgirev, Lyudmila Miloserdova, Xenia Balashova and Andreas Zivy. As such, they "specialized in a licensed type of activity, be it banking, legal, registration or appraisal activities. All this helped to implement criminal schemes and significantly complicated the disclosure of crimes." Toaz management furthermore attempted to illicitly influence state institutions by trying to bribe a judge of the Supreme Court in the hopes of overturning regional courts’ rulings on tax arrears, according to Alexander Bastrykin.

In December 2017, the case about a misappropriation of 85 billion rubles was transferred by Prosecutor General's office to Komsomolsky District Court of Togliatti for trial. Evgeny Korolev, Vladimir Makhlai, Sergei Makhlai and Swiss entrepreneurs Andreas Zivy and Beat Ruprecht were charged with large-scale fraudulent misappropriation as a criminal group. At the time of the transfer, all defendants were on the international wanted list.

==== Sentencing ====
In July 2019, the court sentenced Vladimir and Sergei Makhlai as well as Beat Ruprecht to 9 years in prison. Evgeny Korolev and Andreas Zivy received 8.5 years. Additionally, the court sustained lawsuits filed by Uralchem seeking 77.3 billion rubles in damages from Toaz, as well as another 10.3 billion in damages to Uralchem itself.The verdict entered into force in November 2019, enforcement proceedings began.

== Criminal investigation and conviction ==
On 16 May 2019, the Investigative Committee of the Russian Federation opened criminal case against a group of individuals including Sergei Makhlai under Article 210 of the Russian Criminal Code (organization of a criminal community or participation in it). As part of this investigation General Director of Togliattikhimbank Alexander Popov was arrested two weeks later. RAPSI, Russian legal and judicial newswire, reported that a group of people led by Vladimir Makhlai was suspected in committing a number of serious economic crimes during the period 2005 – 2013.

On 5 July 2019, the Komsomolsky District Court in Togliatti found Sergei and Vladimir Makhlai, Andreas Zivy and two other connected persons guilty of theft totalling Rub 77 billion from Togliattiazot and inflicting damages to minority shareholders in the amount of Rub 10.7 billion.

The Court sentenced both Vladimir and Sergei Makhlai to nine years in prison. Because all the defendants at the time of the sentence were abroad, the sentence was imposed in absentia.

During the Court investigation, it was established that in 2007 President of ZAO Togliattiazot Corporation Vladimir Makhlai and his son Sergei Makhlai, who at that time was Vice-president of the company, used their corporate authority to form an organised criminal group for a systematic theft of the company's products – ammonia and urea.

To facilitate the crime, Court found, settlement and currency accounts of Togliattiazot OJSC were opened in Togliattiimbank, 100% owned by Sergey Makhlai. These accounts were used to receive the proceeds from the sales of TOAZ products to the offshore-registered Swiss firm Nitrochem Distribution AG, led by Beat Ruprecht and owned by Andreas Zivy's Ameropa AG.

A share of the proceeds was kept by the defendants and was not paid to TOAZ. Moreover, the prices for the products were stated significantly below current market prices, to illegally decrease tax liability. Thus, Vladimir and Sergey Makhlai, Zivy and Ruprecht defrauded TOAZ and its shareholders of a total of Rub 85 billion. During the trial, the facts of affiliation between TOAZ, Nitrochem Distribution AG and Ameropa AG were fully proven.

On 26 November 2019, Samara Regional Court made a decision to uphold the verdict of Komsomolsk District Court against Sergei and Vladimir Makhlai and their accomplices.

In 2020, Investigate Committee of Russia started an investigation against Sergei Makhlai for a suspected attempt to bribe members of the Supreme Court for quashing a decision to recover Rub 2.5 billion of unpaid taxes.

He is reportedly also investigated in Ukraine on suspicion of bribing a state official, Viktor Bondyk, former CEO of a state-owned company that manages the cross-country ammonia pipeline.

=== A criminal case for attempting to bribe judges of the Supreme Court of the Russian Federation, initiated in 2020 ===
In January 2020, a new criminal case was initiated against Sergei Makhlai, who was in wanted list, under Part 3 of Article 30 and Part 5 of Article 291 of the Criminal Code of the Russian Federation – giving a bribe on a particularly large scale to judges of the Supreme Court of the Russian Federation for canceling a decision to recover tax arrears from Togliattiazot.

The decision to initiate a criminal case was made by Major General Mikhail Tumanov, the head of the investigative group of the TFR in the case of "Togliatti". In Russia, charges in a new criminal case will be brought against Alexander Popov, the former head of Tolyattikhimbank, who is under arrest, and Oleg Antoshin, the former head of the security service of Tolyattiazot. Sergei Makhlai allegedly instructed them in 2015 to find an intermediary in order to bribe the judges of the Supreme Court in the amount of 2 million euros, courts of the Russian Federation, The Kommersant newspaper reported. The defendants acted together with "unidentified persons" and did not carry out their intentions to the end, as the Supreme Court issued a ruling on the refusal to transfer the cassation appeal to the Board of Economic Disputes.

At the end of July 2020, the Chairman of the Investigative Committee of the Russian Federation, Alexander Bastrykin, spoke about the most dangerous crimes in Russia. He singled out illegal activities against PJSC TOAZ, and said that for 20 years the theft of assets and profits of the company had been committed. Law enforcement agencies have identified an organized criminal community that operated from 1997 to 2018. According to Bastrykin, the OPS included the heads of the enterprise and foreign citizens. In 2020, the investigation continued, the investigation identified 15 people involved in the commission of crimes.

In June 2021, Alexander Popov was found guilty and sentenced to 7.5 years of imprisonment in a strict regime colony and a fine of 500 million rubles for attempted bribery of judges of the Supreme Court of Russia (Part 3 of Article 30, Part 5 of Article 291 of the Criminal Code of the Russian Federation).

According to investigators, the owner and head of "Togliatti" Sergey Makhlai, being a person involved in the criminal case of theft of "Togliatti" products, was also brought to justice for committing a tax violation. To avoid paying additional taxes, Makhlai decided to bribe a judge of the Supreme Court through an intermediary. The former head of Tolyattikhimbank, Alexander Popov, acted as an intermediary for giving a bribe, who, using his official position, put $ 2 million into a bank cell, giving intermediaries access to a bank cell. Popov could not bring the crime to an end, and was convicted of attempting to bribe judges of the Supreme Court of the Russian Federation.
