= Pyotr Kondrashev =

Russian billionaire and oligarch

Pyotr Ivanovich Kondrashev (Russian: Пётр Иванович Кондрашев; born 16 July 1949 in Armavir) is a former industrial manager and entrepreneur, oligarch and billionaire of Russian origin.

== Career ==
Kondrashev earned an engineering degree in mining and metallurgy, specializing in underground mining, from Magnitogorsk State Technical University.

In 1972, he began working at the Silvinit potash plant in Solikamsk as a foreman. Until 1990, he worked there in this position, as chief engineer and as deputy production manager. In 1990, the workforce elected him general director. Kondrashev initiated privatization and became one of the main shareholders of Silvinit. In 2007, he retired as head of the company, but remained a member of the board of directors.

In late 2010, Kondrashev, owner of 14 percent of the Silvinit, and his partners sold their shares to competitor Uralkali. The driving force behind this transaction, worth nearly $3 billion for a combined 44 percent of all shares, was considered to be pro-Kremlin Duma member Suleyman Kerimov, who held shares in both companies, also Duma member Zelimkhan Mutsoev, and billionaire Anatoly Skurov. This transaction created what was then the world's second-largest producer of potash fertilizer.

In 2014, Kondrashev bought the Solikamsk Magnesium Plant (SMZ) from the conglomerate owned by Suleyman Kerimov. SMZ mines and processes Rare-earth elements: 60% of Russian magnesium is produced at this plant.

Kondrashev invested in Meyer Burger in 2016, saving the Swiss solar equipment manufacturer, according to Neue Zürcher Zeitung and Berner Zeitung. His calls for personnel changes at the top and a new direction for the company met with resistance until March 2020. By the fall of 2022, he held about 10 percent of the company's shares.

== Expropriation ==
In 2019, the Federal Antimonopoly Service of Russia demanded the cancellation of the purchase of SMZ, claiming that the transaction was illegal in 2014 because SMZ, as a strategically important company for Russia, had been transferred to foreign investors without the approval of government agencies. In October 2020, a court in Perm upheld the authority. Already at the beginning of July 2020, Mikhail Dvorkovich, brother of former Deputy Chairman in the Government of Russia Arkady Dvorkovich, had claimed in the Russian newspaper Kommersant that SMZ majority shareholders led by Kondrashev had sold goods to "suppliers of the military-industrial complex of NATO countries", potentially threatening Russia's security. Intelligence online said of the expropriation that Kondrashev, as a Russian living abroad, was the first to lose out in a wave of internal Russian nationalization accelerated by the Russo-Ukrainian War. The expropriation was executed by decree of Vladimir Putin at the end of January 2023.

== Controversies ==
In 2021, Russian blogs claimed that Kondrashev was one of the "secret owners" of Ecoprombank, a Russian financial company that filed for bankruptcy in 2014. Corresponding posts spoke of various criminal acts. Kondrashev initiated legal action in Austria and Switzerland against these allegations and their dissemination. Neue Zürcher Zeitung and Handelsblatt, respectively, reported that there were no criminal proceedings against Kondrashev, referring to statements by Russian authorities.

== Assets, private life, honors ==
As of August 2022, Forbes estimated Kondrasev's net worth at $1.5 billion.

Kondrashev has lived in Vienna since 2008, is married, and has two children.

He has received several awards, including honorary citizenship of the city of Solikamsk. In 2004, he received the Peter the Great National Award for his achievements as a manager.
