= Beloye, Altai Krai =

Beloye Белое
- Selo
- Location within Altai Krai Location within Russia
- Coordinates: 51°37′N 85°20′E
- Country: Russia
- Region: Altai Krai
- District: Altaysky District
- Time zone: UTC+7:00

Beloye (Russian: Белое) is a rural locality (a selo) and the administrative center of Belovsky Selsoviet, Altaysky District, Altai Krai, Russia. The population was 228 as of 2013. There are 12 streets.

== Geography ==
Beloye is located 44 km south of Altayskoye (the district's administrative centre) by road. Bulukhta is the nearest rural locality.
