= Nizhnekamenka =

Nizhnekamenka Нижнекаменка
- Village
- Location within Altai Krai Location within Russia
- Coordinates: 52°02′N 85°22′E
- Country: Russia
- Region: Altai Krai
- District: Altaysky District
- Time zone: UTC+7:00

Nizhnekamenka (Russian: Нижнекаменка) is a rural locality (a selo) and the administrative center of Nizhnekamensky Selsoviet of Altaysky District, Altai Krai, Russia. The population was 2045 as of 2016. There are 35 streets.

== Geography ==
Nizhnekamenka is located on the left bank of the Kamenka River, 12 km north of Altayskoye (the district's administrative centre) by road. Altayskoye is the nearest rural locality.

== Ethnicity ==
The village is inhabited by Russians and others.
