= Bulukhta =

Bulukhta Булухта
- Settlement
- Location within Altai Krai Location within Russia
- Coordinates: 51°35′N 85°24′E
- Country: Russia
- Region: Altai Krai
- District: Altaysky District
- Time zone: UTC+7:00

Bulukhta (Russian: Булухта) is a rural locality (a settlement) in Belovsky Selsoviet, Altaysky District, Altai Krai, Russia. The population was 8 as of 2013. There is 1 street.

== Geography ==
Bulukhta is located 47 km south of Altayskoye (the district's administrative centre) by road. Beloye is the nearest rural locality.
