= Katun, Altai Krai =

Katun Катунь
- Settlement
- Location within Altai Krai Location within Russia
- Coordinates: 51°54′N 85°51′E
- Country: Russia
- Region: Altai Krai
- District: Altaysky District
- Time zone: UTC+7:00

Katun (Russian: Катунь) is a rural locality (a settlement) in Aysky Selsoviet, Altaysky District, Altai Krai, Russia. The population was 272 as of 2013. There are 11 streets.

== Geography ==
Katun is located on the Katun River, 48 km east of Altayskoye (the district's administrative centre) by road. Rybalka is the nearest rural locality.
