= Starobelokurikha =

Starobelokurikha Старобелокуриха
- Selo
- Location within Altai Krai Location within Russia
- Coordinates: 52°03′N 85°05′E
- Country: Russia
- Region: Altai Krai
- District: Altaysky District
- Time zone: UTC+7:00

Starobelokurikha (Russian: Старобелокуриха) is a rural locality (a selo) in Starobelokurikhinsky Selsoviet, Altaysky District, Altai Krai, Russia. The population was 1,517 as of 2013. There are 18 streets.

== Geography ==
Starobelokurikha is located 34 km northwest of Altayskoye (the district's administrative centre) by road. Belokurikha is the nearest rural locality.
