= Makaryevka =

Makaryevka Макарьевка
- Village
- Location within Altai Krai Location within Russia
- Coordinates: 51°59′N 85°13′E
- Country: Russia
- Region: Altai Krai
- District: Altaysky District
- Time zone: UTC+7:00

Makaryevka (Russian: Макарьевка) is a rural locality (a selo) and the administrative center of Makaryevsky Selsoviet of Altaysky District, Altai Krai, Russia. The population was 444 as of 2016. There are 10 streets.

== Geography ==
Makaryevka is located 11 km northwest of Altayskoye (the district's administrative centre) by road. Altayskoye is the nearest rural locality.

== Ethnicity ==
The village is inhabited by Russians and others.
