= Rudnik, Altai Krai =

Rudnik Рудник
- Settlement
- Location within Altai Krai Location within Russia
- Coordinates: 51°49′N 85°20′E
- Country: Russia
- Region: Altai Krai
- District: Altaysky District
- Time zone: UTC+7:00

Rudnik (Russian: Рудник) is a rural locality (a settlement) in Proletarsky Selsoviet, Altaysky District, Altai Krai, Russia. The population was 75 as of 2013. There are 2 streets.

== Geography ==
Rudnik is located 17 km south of Altayskoye (the district's administrative centre) by road. Sarasa is the nearest rural locality.
