= Verkh-Aya =

Verkh-Aya Верх-Ая
- Selo
- Location within Altai Krai Location within Russia
- Coordinates: 51°57′N 85°40′E
- Country: Russia
- Region: Altai Krai
- District: Altaysky District
- Time zone: UTC+7:00

Verkh-Aya (Russian: Верх-Ая) is a rural locality (a selo) in Aysky Selsoviet, Altaysky District, Altai Krai, Russia. The population was 306 as of 2013. There are 3 streets.

== Geography ==
Verkh-Ya is located on the Aya River, 31 km east of Altayskoye (the district's administrative centre) by road. Aya is the nearest rural locality.
