= Dmitri Osipov (manager) =

Russian businessman (1966–2025)

Dmitry Osipov
- Дмитрий Осипов

Personal details
- Born: Dmitry Vasilyevich Osipov; 29 April 1966 Gorky, Russian SFSR, USSR
- Died: 12 August 2025 (aged 59)
- Party: United Russia
- Children: 2
- Education: N. I. Lobachevsky State University of Nizhny Novgorod

Dmitry Vasilyevich Osipov (Russian: Дмитрий Васильевич Осипов; 29 April 1966 – 12 August 2025) was a Russian businessman known for being the chairman of Board of PJSC Uralkali and CEO of VSMPO-AVISMA. He was the CEO of Uralkali, member of the council International Fertilizer Industry Association, and Legislator of the Legislative Assembly of Perm Krai.

== Life and career ==
Osipov was born on 29 April 1966 in the city of Gorky.

He graduated from the Gorky state university with a degree in radiophysics and electronics.

In the 2000s he held executive positions in chemical companies including JSC Khimprom (Volgograd), JSC Propane-butane Company, JSC Sibur Khimprom.

From 2005 to 2007 he was the CEO of JSC Kirovo-Chepetsk Chemical Works. From 2007 to 2011, he was the CEO of UralChem company and from 2007 to 2013, he was the board member of JSC UCC UralChem.

In 2011 he was the member of council and the member of Financial Committee of International Association of Producers of Fertilizers (International Fertilizer Association, IFA).

From 2011 to 2013 he was the vice-chairman of Board of Directors of UCC UralChem. On 23 December 2013 Dmitry Osipov was appointed CEO of PJSC Uralkali.

As of March 2014, he was a board member of Uralkali. By 2016 he was a board member of the UralChem company. From 2021 to 2023 he was CEO VSMPO-AVISMA. Since 2023, he was the chairman of Board of directors of PJSC Uralkali.

Osipov died on 12 August 2025, at the age of 59.
