= Kuyagan =

Kuyagan Куяган
- Selo
- Location within Altai Krai Location within Russia
- Coordinates: 51°42′N 84°54′E
- Country: Russia
- Region: Altai Krai
- District: Altaysky District
- Time zone: UTC+7:00

Kuyagan (Russian: Куяган) is a rural locality (a selo) and the administrative center of Kuyagansky Selsoviet, Altaysky District, Altai Krai, Russia. The population was 779 as of 2013. There are 19 streets.

== Geography ==
Kuyagan is located on the Kuyagan River, 52 km southwest of Altayskoye (the district's administrative centre) by road. Kazanka is the nearest rural locality.
