= Nizhnekayancha =

Nizhnekayancha Нижнекаянча
- Selo
- Location within Altai Krai Location within Russia
- Coordinates: 51°51′N 85°42′E
- Country: Russia
- Region: Altai Krai
- District: Altaysky District
- Time zone: UTC+7:00

Nizhnekayancha (Russian: Нижнекаянча) is a rural locality (a selo) in Aysky Selsoviet, Altaysky District, Altai Krai, Russia. The population was 414 as of 2013. There are 9 streets.

== Geography ==
Nizhnekayancha is located on the Katun River, 61 km southeast of Altayskoye (the district's administrative centre) by road. Ustyuba is the nearest rural locality.
