= Kazanka, Altai Krai =

Kazanka Казанка
- Settlement
- Location within Altai Krai Location within Russia
- Coordinates: 51°40′N 84°47′E
- Country: Russia
- Region: Altai Krai
- District: Altaysky District
- Time zone: UTC+7:00

Kazanka (Russian: Казанка) is a rural locality (a settlement) in Kuyagansky Selsoviet, Altaysky District, Altai Krai, Russia. The population was 5 as of 2013. There is 1 street.

== Geography ==
Kazanka is located on the Kuyagan River, 62 km southwest of Altayskoye (the district's administrative centre) by road. Kuyagan is the nearest rural locality.
