= Bolshaya Kyrkyla =

Bolshaya Kyrkyla Большая Кыркыла
- Settlement
- Location within Altai Krai Location within Russia
- Coordinates: 51°45′N 85°21′E
- Country: Russia
- Region: Altai Krai
- District: Altaysky District
- Time zone: UTC+7:00

Bolshaya Kyrkyla (Russian: Большая Кыркыла) is a rural locality (a settlement) in Proletarsky Selsoviet, Altaysky District, Altai Krai, Russia. The population was 13 as of 2013. There is 1 street.

== Geography ==
Bolshaya Kyrkyla is located 25 km south of Altayskoye (the district's administrative centre) by road. Proletarka is the nearest rural locality.
