= Tourak =

Tourak Тоурак
- Selo
- Location within Altai Krai Location within Russia
- Coordinates: 51°34′N 85°00′E
- Country: Russia
- Region: Altai Krai
- District: Altaysky District
- Time zone: UTC+7:00

Tourak (Russian: Тоурак) is a rural locality (a selo) in Kuyachinsky Selsoviet, Altaysky District, Altai Krai, Russia. The population was 378 as of 2013. There are 7 streets.

== Geography ==
Tourak is located 77 km southwest of Altayskoye (the district's administrative centre) by road. Kuyacha is the nearest rural locality.
