= Anatoly Skurov =

Russian mining engineer (born 1952)

Anatoly G. Skurov
- Born: Anatoly Georgievich Skurov; December 7, 1952 (age 73); Tula Oblast, Russian SFSR, USSR
- Occupation: entrepreneur
- Title: Retiree
- Spouse: Lubov I. Skurova
- Children: 2

Anatoly Georgievich Skurov (Russian: Анатолий Георгиевич Скуров; born 7 December 1952) is a Russian mining engineer, scientist and design engineer, and entrepreneur.

== Biography ==
Skurov was born in the Tula Oblast, Russian SFSR, USSR on 7 December 1952, and is currently a resident of Moscow.

He graduated from the Mining Department of the Tula Polytechnic Institute in 1975, and went to work at the Kopeisk Engineering Plant in the Chelyabinsk Oblast, a major manufacturer of underground mining machines and equipment in Russia and the Soviet Union. In 1988, he was appointed to the position of Chief Technical Designer and Head of the Plant's Design Bureau. He oversaw tests and implementation of new mining equipment in the underground mines of Kuzbass, Donbas, and Kazakhstan, and was part of Soviet Ministry of Coal Mining inter-departmental committees. He was one of the key persons who designed and produced the GPKS - the most widely used and one of the most efficient continuous heading machines in the Soviet Union and the Russian Federation.

Skurov holds 41 patents and inventor's certificates for various inventions in the coal mining industry. He defended a PhD thesis in 1991 on creating efficient mining equipment and machinery. He has authored a large number of peer-reviewed scientific articles.

Mr. Skurov is an Honorary Worker of the Russian Coal Mining Industry, holder of the Miner's Badge of Honor, First, Second, and Third class, and an Honorary Miner of Kuzbass. He is a full member of the Russian Academy of Mining Science.

He was transferred from the Kopeisk Engineering Plant to a major Russian coal producer Rosugol, which is controlled and operated by the government, in 1994, where he took the position of Senior Designer at the Department of Mining Equipment.

In 1995, Mr. Skurov joined forces with Kuznetskugol officers Anatoly Smolyaninov and Valentin Bukhtoyarov to organize private coal mining company Sibuglemet and held the position of the General Director of that company until 2003.

He became president of Sibuglemet Holding Company in 2003[1].

Skurov has held an equity stake in Russian potash producer Uralkali since 2011. He sold his shares in Sibuglemet Holding and Uralkali in 2013.

== Personal fortune ==
He was first listed by the Forbes magazine as the 86th richest businessman in Russia with a personal fortune of US$800 million. Forbes rated him as the 43rd richest person in Russia, with US$2.3 billion in 2011, and in 2012 he was down in the 64th spot with US$1.7 billion.

== Personal life and family ==
He is married to Lubov I. Skurova, and is father of two sons.

== See also ==
- Aleksandr Filippovich Shchukin
