= Mazepin =

Mazepin (Belarusian: Мазепін; Russian: Мазепин; Мазе́пин) is a surname.

Notable people with the surname include:

- Dmitry Mazepin (born 1968), Belarus-born Russian businessman
- Nikita Mazepin (born 1999), Russian racing driver, son of Dmitry
