= Danilovka, Altaysky District, Altai Krai =

Danilovka Даниловка
- Settlement
- Location within Altai Krai Location within Russia
- Coordinates: 51°58′N 85°03′E
- Country: Russia
- Region: Altai Krai
- District: Altaysky District
- Time zone: UTC+7:00

Danilovka (Russian: Даниловка) is a rural locality (a settlement) in Starobelokurikhinsky Selsoviet, Altaysky District, Altai Krai, Russia. The population was 15 as of 2013. There are 3 streets.

== Geography ==
Danilovka is located 52 km west of Altayskoye (the district's administrative centre) by road. Belokurikha is the nearest rural locality.
