= Remo Lütolf (industrial manager) =

Swiss industrial manager

Remo Marc Lütolf
- Born: March 19, 1956 (age 69); Meggen, Switzerland
- Occupation(s): Business executive, academic administrator
- Known for: On the Board of several major Swiss companies

Remo Marc Lütolf (born 19 March 1956, in Meggen) is a Swiss industrial manager and Vice-President of the University of Applied Sciences Council of Northwestern Switzerland.

== Early life and education ==
Remo Lütolf was born in Meggan, Switzerland in 1956. He studied electrical engineering at the ETH Zurich from 1975-1980 and graduated with a degree in electrical engineering. He then obtained his doctorate in 1986, concluding his studies with a dissertation in biomedical engineering, supplemented in 2000 by an EMBA from IMD Lausanne.

== Career ==
Remo Lütolf began his professional career at Landis+Gyr in Zug and joined ABB Switzerland in 1999. Five years later he became head of the global business unit Power Electronics and Medium Voltage Drives and worked in Turgi/Baden as well as four years at ABB China in Shanghai with additional responsibility for the Automation Products Division in North Asia. [4] From 2013 to mid-2018 Remo Lütolf was head of ABB Switzerland and chairman of the executive board. After one year as Chairman of the Board of Directors at Meyer Burger, he did not stand for a seat on the Board of Directors after a public debate with the largest shareholder, after the representative of the largest shareholder was to be elected to the Board against his opposition.

Lütolf went on to hold responsibilities on the boards of directors of various Swiss companies. Since 2018, he has been Chairman of the Board of Directors of RUAG, a technology group based in Berne, Switzerland, which is mainly active in the aerospace, defence and security markets with both civil and governmental customers worldwide. He has also been Chairman of Energie Wasser Luzern Holding AG since 2017, Chairman of Erdgas Zentralschweiz AG since 2017, and of Venture Incubator. Since 2018, he has also been Chairman of Park Innovaare.

Lütolf is also a board committee member of Swissmem, an association for SMEs and large companies in the Swiss mechanical engineering, electrical engineering and metalworking industries and related technology-oriented sectors. He is also a board member of Economiesuisse, the largest organisation for the Swiss economy.
