= Rossoshi, Altai Krai =

Rossoshi Россоши
- Village
- Location within Altai Krai Location within Russia
- Coordinates: 52°05′N 85°14′E
- Country: Russia
- Region: Altai Krai
- District: Altaysky District
- Time zone: UTC+7:00

Rossoshi (Russian: Россоши) is a rural locality (a selo) and the administrative center of Rossoshinsky Selsoviet of Altaysky District, Altai Krai, Russia. The population was 1018 as of 2016. There are 17 streets.

== Geography ==
The village is located on the bank of the Poperechnaya River, 23 km northwest of Altayskoye (the district's administrative centre) by road. Starobelokurikha is the nearest rural locality.

== Ethnicity ==
The village is inhabited by Russians and other ethnicities.
