= Bulatovo, Altai Krai =

Bulatovo Булатово
- Selo
- Location within Altai Krai Location within Russia
- Coordinates: 51°44′N 84°45′E
- Country: Russia
- Region: Altai Krai
- District: Altaysky District
- Time zone: UTC+7:00

Bulatovo (Russian: Булатово) is a rural locality (a selo) in Kuyagansky Selsoviet, Altaysky District, Altai Krai, Russia. The population was 42 as of 2013. There are 3 streets.

== Geography ==
Bulatovo is located 72 km WSW of Altayskoye (the district's administrative centre) by road. Kazanka is the nearest rural locality.
