= Ameropa Holding =

Swiss agribusiness

Ameropa Holding AG is a Swiss agribusiness, headquartered in Binningen, Switzerland (Basel-Landschaft), that engages in the global distribution of fertilizers and grains. The company was founded in 1948 by Arthur Zivy and his son, Felix Zivy. Andreas Zivy is the chairman of the company. It has operations in over 30 countries across all continents.

== History ==
Arthur and his son, Felix Zivy, founded Ameropa in 1948. In the beginning, the company focused on the import of grains into Europe and the export of European fertilizers to the United States. In the same year, a subsidiary was established in Austria under the name Prochaska & Cie.

In the 1950s, Ameropa entered the South American grains market and obtained the European Agency for wheat and corn sales from Association de Cooperativas Argentinas. As one of the earliest companies, Ameropa began importing Brazilian soybeans into Europe in 1959.

In the 1970s, Ameropa established its second subsidiary, AgriNégoce, in France. By 2007, AgriNégoce employed over 130 people and had sales of over 120 million euros. In 2016, AgriNégoce was sold to the French agricultural company Axéréal.

In the early 1990s, Ameropa expanded its operation to Germany, Hungary, Slovakia, Russia, Belarus, China, and Brazil. Andreas Zivy, the son of Felix Zivy, was appointed CEO of the company in 1995. In 1997, Ameropa was a founding partner of the chemical trading company Kolmar, which was later on sold to Kolmar's management.

The company provided US$70 million to MagIndustries to develop its potash project in the Republic of Congo in June 2008. At the time, the company also had a 9.4% shareholding in MagIndustries. The largest acquisition by the company was concluded in 2012, when Ameropa Holding acquired the Romanian nitrogen fertilizer factory Azomures and the Constanța Port Terminal, Chimpex.

By the end of 2016, the company had expanded operations to 31 countries including distribution centers in various countries, for example Serbia, Romania, Hungary, Australia, and the US.

== Involvement in the Togliattiazot Affair ==
Following the request of a minority stakeholder of Togliattiazot, in 2012 a criminal case (later entitled the Togliattiazot affair) investigating the embezzlement of 89 billion rubles was commenced. Included among those involved in the enterprise, was Andreas Zivy, president of the board of Ameropa Holding AG. Zivy was issued a warrant for arrest by the Basmanny District Court in Moscow (RAPSI) in December 2014 as a suspect of criminal behaviour in the fraud worth $400 million. Following the investigation and court heartings, Zivy was sentenced to 8.5 years in prison in 2019 and a fine of 900,000 rubles.

Non-Russian courts, journalists, academics, and international organisations, have criticized the affair, describing it as "a classic example of Russian corporate siege and raiding practices" and “flagrantly unfair”. Two reports from Russia experts from George Mason University highlighted the case as one of the most comprehensive illegal corporate raids in Russia involving malicious prosecution. Interpol has said "there is a predominant political dimension to this case" and concluded that a Russian request for Mr. Zivy’s arrest "does not satisfy the requirements of Interpol’s Constitution". A UK Magistrate's Court, in rejecting Russia's extradition request for one of the co-defendants, described the case as "a weak case without the crucial evidential foundation a charge which grossly inflates the complainant’s loss, a complainant which is corrupt yet powerful, evidence of investigators who appear to be too close to the complainant, a long history of attacks on the accused evidence of a lack of independence of the judge”.

Ameropa said the verdict is unenforceable outside of Russia and has appealed the case to the European Court of Human Rights.

== Corporate Structure ==
=== Network ===
Included among the Ameropa Holding AG group network are the following entities:

- Ameropa North America Inc.
- Ameropa Düngemittel GmbH
- Ameropa Iberia SL
- Chimpex SA
- Ameropa Trade Holding AG
- Ameropa Australia PTY Ltd.
- Ameropa AG
- Ameropa Holding AG
- Ameropa DG Holding AG
