= TogliattiAzot =

Russian chemical company

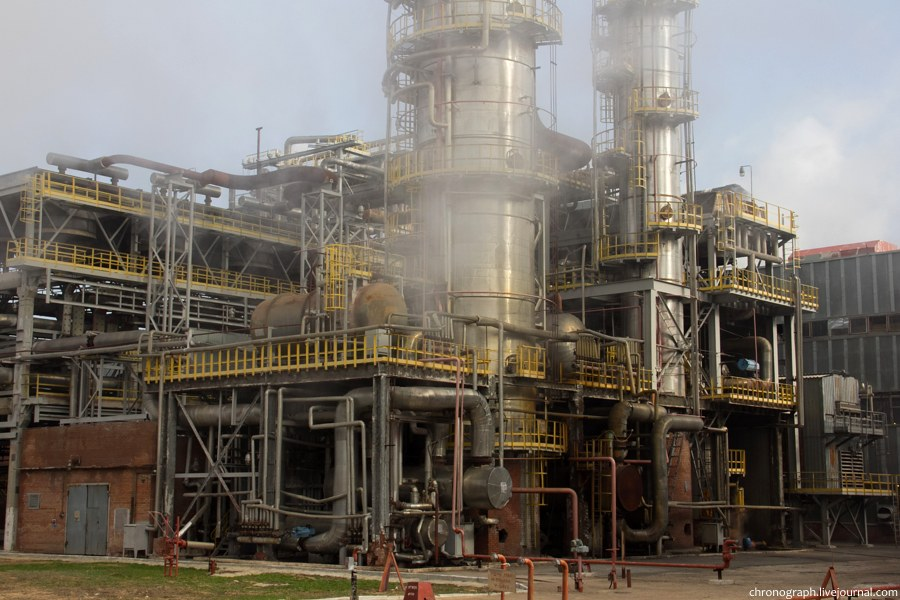
- Native name: ТольяттиАзот
- Type: Private
- Industry: Chemicals
- Founded: 1974
- Headquarters: Tolyatti, Russia
- Products: Ammonia, Carbonic acid, Ceramic Production, Refractory materials and Frit, Urea Formaldehyde Concentrate
- Revenue: $723 million (2017)
- Operating income: $105 million (2017)
- Net income: $14.4 million (2017)
- Total assets: $1.39 billion (2017)
- Total equity: $1.17 billion (2017)
- Number of employees: 6000
- Parent: Uralchem
- Website: http://www.toaz.ru/eng/

TogliattiAzot (Russian: ТольяттиАзот) is a Russian chemical company and has recently been identified as being the world's largest ammonia producer. It is headquartered in Tolyatti, Russia.

TogliattiAzot is one of the largest taxpayers in the Samara region.

== History ==
Construction on the first TogliattiAzot nitrogen plant commenced in 1974 due to William J. Casey securing a $180 million loan from Eximbank to the Soviet Union in support of Armand Hammer's interests associated with fertilizer détente. The factory and plant were commissioned as part of a joint venture between Occidental Petroleum and the Soviet Government. The 1970s saw the construction of the Togliatti–Odesa ammonia pipeline which stretches for 2,471 km to the Port of Odesa.

In August 1983, the company produced the first shipment of liquid carbon nitrogen. In 1985 the first urea-formaldehyde resin production unit was commissioned. Four of the seven current ammonia plants at Tolyatti were constructed by Chemico.

During the 1980s, two urea processing plants were constructed with a combined production capacity of 480,000 tons per year.

In 2012 TogliattiAzot announced the start of major modernization project. The eight-year modernization plan includes a “major renovation” of existing facilities and upgraded manufacturing. The plan also includes the upgrade of 7 existing ammonia plants, air compressors, and the replacement of the reaction tubes and heat exchangers.

The main ammonia plant in Tolyatti was constructed as a joint project of the Soviet Government and Armand Hammer. TogliattiAzot started operations in 1979.

Following the severe financial difficulties experienced during the past 10 years by the city's other major employer, AvtoVAZ, TogliattiAzot has been responsible for providing many services and social programs to Tolyatti, a city of 720,000 inhabitants.

During the Russo-Ukrainian war, the Black Sea Grain Initiative required the pipeline to be reopened, however this did not happen.

== Management ==
Vladimir Makhlai was appointed TogliattiAzot's director general in 1985. Following TogliattiAzot's privatization in 1992, the company was managed by members of Makhlai family and their appointees.

Vladimir Makhlai bought 20% of the company during perestroika and gradually increased his shareholding to a controlling stake at the end of the 1990s.

Sergei Makhlai took over the Chairman of the Board position from his father, Vladimir Makhlai in 2011 and remains in that position as in September 2015.

In the corporate structure put in place by TogliattiAzot's shareholders, the role of TogliattiAzot's CEO is assigned to its management company, TogliattiAzot Corporation, which is under the same control as the company itself.

TogliattiAzot Corporation's CEO is Vyacheslav Suslov. He replaced the company's long standing CEO Eugeny Korolev in January 2015.

From June 2019 to July 2021, Dmitry Mezheedovy was the CEO.

In November 2021, a meeting was held at which a new board of directors was elected, which included Andrey Ermizin, Sergey Momtsemlidze, Mikhail Lopatin, Dimitri Tatyanin and Artur Karamashev. Dimitri Tatyanin became Chairman of the Board of Directors, Anatoly Shablinsky was appointed General Director of Tolyattiazot.

== Shareholder (Corporate) Conflicts ==
Since the late-1990s TogliattiAzot has been selling its produce in the international markets primarily through Nitrochem Distribution, a Swiss trading company owned by Ameropa Holding AG, a Swiss trader.

The partnership between Nitrochem and TogliattiAzot has existed since the mid-1990s and has undergone numerous audits by regulatory and law enforcement agencies. The independent industry experts who conducted these audits have confirmed that – based on the details and circumstances of TogliattiAzot's activities and products, most of which are exported through the Tolyatti–Odesa pipeline – the company's export prices do comply with market rates. Judicial investigations have found no affiliation has been found between TogliattiAzot's management or major shareholders and Nitrochem Distribution AG: TogliattiAzot has stated that all its export activities fully comply with Russian legislation, and that its partnership with a western trader is a standard practice adopted for commercial convenience.

The shareholder conflict instigated by Uralchem has been deemed a corporate raiding attack against TogliattiAzot. It is not the first legal case against the company: according to TogliattiAzot's lawyer "Such a claim has already occurred, it wound up on criminal charges, which were then dropped due to lack of corpus delicti".

In December 2021 after the 10 year corporate conflict, Federal Antimonopoly Service approved the purchase of 83,731% of shares of TogliattiAzot by JSC "Khimaktivinvest", controlled by Dmitry Mazepin, Uralchem owner. Thus, "Khimaktivinvest" is able to control 93,723% of TogliattiAzot.

Hereafter in January 2022 Oleg Egerev, trustee of Sergey Makhlai, announced the sale of 38,7% of shares for 31 billion roubles within S.Makhlai`s bankruptcy case. Since July 2019 movables and immovables of TogliattiAzot are arrested by decision of the Court of Komsomolsky district in the case of fraud against Vladimir Makhlai, Sergey Makhlai, Evgeny Korolev and their Swiss partners Andreas Zivy and Beat Ruprecht.

== TogliattiAzot Pipeline ==
The world's longest ammonia pipeline runs from TogliattiAzot's plant in Russia to Odesa in Ukraine. The 'Tolyatti – Odesa' pipeline, through which TogliattiAzot exports ammonia, was finished in 1981. It is 2,500 kilometres (1,600 mi) long.

In 2015 the company received the approvals needed for the construction and launch of a deep sea ammonia and urea transshipment complex in the Port of Taman, Krasnodar Region. The completion date for the first terminal is scheduled for 2017, and operational commissioning for the second terminal is scheduled for 2020.

== Products ==
=== Agricultural Products ===
- Ammonia – TogliattiAzot produces up to 3 million tons of ammonia per year. In 1993, ammonia unit AM 76 was fully automated by Honeywell, and again in late 2015. In 2001, the European Bank for Reconstruction and Development approved a loan for $40 million for expansion of ammonia production.
- Liquid ammonia – TogliattiAzot's total output of liquid ammonia in 2014 was 2.9 million tons. In 2015, Houston based KBR Inc. was awarded a contract to revamp the existing seven ammonia plants in Tolyatti.
- Urea – The construction of a new Urea plant was commissioned by TogliattiAzot in 2015.

=== Materials Science ===
- Urea Formaldehyde Concentrate (UFC) – The development of Urea Formaldehyde Concentrate (UFC) was patented by TogliattiAzot in 1998. The company produces two grades of UFC: a processing granular nitrogen, and a resin base at the company's factory at Sheksninsky. In 2006, TogliattiAzot opened a 25,000 tonne UFC facility bringing production capacity to around 40,000 tonnes.
- Carbonic Acid – Togliattizot runs a process plant for the production of liquid carbonic acid and the processing of ammonia waste.
- Basalt Fiber and Film – High-strength basalt fiber is produced and utilized by TogliattiAzot at all its plants. The basalt fiber is used as a non-flammable thermal insulator.
- Ceramic Production – TogliattiAzot runs a successful brick making factory in Toylatti reported to produce in excess of 60 million bricks per year.
- Consumer Goods – TogliattiAzot owns a consumer goods manufacturing company producing home and office furniture as well as window and door frames. Items are sold in the Samara region and across Russia.

== Social activities ==
In 2014 TogliattiAzot started an initiative to support families raising disabled children in Tolyatti. 100 financial grants were made available.

TogliattiAzot has sponsored the annual international environmental congress 'ELPIT' on several years including 2015.

=== Political activity ===
In 2004-2009 the management of TogliattiAzot provided support to the deputy of the 4th Tolyatti City Duma, Oleg Antoshin, who, after his parliamentary activities, worked as the head of the economic security service of TogliattiAzot.

In 2016 the chairwoman of the TogliattiAzot trade union, Olga Sevostyanova, was elected to the 6th Samara Regional Duma on the United Russia list.

In 2018 during the elections to the 7th Tolyatti City Duma, Deputy General Director of TogliattiAzot Viktor Kazachkov, General Director of Transammiak Andrey Ivanov, and Chairman of the Council of Young Professionals Yevgenia Sukhodeyeva were elected as deputies from United Russia.

In November 2019 Mikhail Maryakhin, a member of the Samara Regional Duma and chairman of the regional branch of A Just Russia, was appointed Deputy General Director for Interaction with Government Bodies of TogliattiAzot.
