= Avtozavodsky =

Avtozavodsky (masculine), Avtozavodskaya (feminine), or Avtozavodskoye (neuter) may refer to:

- Avtozavodsky City District, name of several city districts in Russia
- Avtozavodsky Bridge, a bridge in Moscow, Russia

Metro lines

- Aŭtazavodskaja line, a line of the Minsk Metro, Minsk, Belarus
- Avtozavodskaya line (Nizhny Novgorod Metro), a line of the Nizhny Novgorod Metro, Nizhny Novgorod, Russia

Metro stations

- Avtozavodskaya (Zamoskvoretskaya line), a station of the Moscow Metro, Moscow, Russia
- Avtozavodskaya (Moscow Central Circle), a station of the Moscow Ring Railway, Russia
- Aŭtazavodskaja (Minsk Metro), a station of the Avtozavodskaya Line of the Minsk Metro, Minsk, Belarus
- Avtozavodskaya (Nizhny Novgorod Metro), a station of the Nizhny Novgorod Metro, Nizhny Novgorod, Russia
