= Uralchem =

Russian chemical manufacturer

- Company type: Private company
- Industry: Chemical
- Founded: 2007
- Headquarters: Moscow
- Key people: Dmitry Tatyanin (Chairman); Dmitry Konyaev (CEO)
- Products: Mineral fertilizers and chemical products for industrial consumption
- Revenue: ₽110.2 billion
- Owners: Dmitry Mazepin (48%) Dmitry Tatyanin (48%) Dmitry Konyaev (4%)
- Number of employees: 9898 (2017)
- Parent: URALCHEM Holding (Kaliningrad Oblast)
- Website: www.uralchem.com

Uralchem Group is a Russian manufacturer of a wide range of chemical products, including mineral fertilizers and ammoniac saltpeter. It is the largest producer of ammonium nitrate as well as the second largest producer of ammonia and nitrogen fertilizers in Russia. The products are supplied in addition to Russia to the CIS countries, Eastern Europe, Asia, Africa and Latin America.

== Owners ==
General Director of the company Dmitry Konyaev (owns 4% of shares), Chairman of the Board of Directors Dmitry Tatyanin (48% of shares). Dmitry Mazepin stepped down from management and retained 48% of the company's shares.

== History and expansion ==
Uralchem was founded in 2007 by businessman Dmitry Mazepin, who was the majority shareholder of the enterprise until 2022, when he reduced his share to 48%. According to the company website, Uralchem was established after the controlling stakes of chemical companies Kirovo-Chepetsk Chemical Works and Azot were combined to form a single enterprise.

In 2008, Uralchem acquired a 71.1 percent stake in Voskresensk Mineral Fertilizers, followed by 100 percent stock acquisition in 2011. Equally in 2008, the company bought a 7.5 percent stake in chemical company Togliattiazot and increased its stake to just below 10 percent the following year. It also obtained 44.3 percent of JSC Perm Mineral Fertilizers in 2009. In 2017, Uralchem increased its stake in Perm Mineral Fertilizers to 100 percent. In 2023, Uralchem completed the reorganization of Voskresensk Mineral Fertilizers JSC in the form of a merger with UCC Uralchem JSC.

In April 2010, the company announced to float 40 percent of its shares on the London Stock Exchange in the hopes of raising up to $600 million in funds to be used for servicing debt incurred by the acquisitions. However, the IPO was put on hold in October that year, citing unfavorable market conditions and investors' nervousness "about external factors."

The company three years later, in 2013, bought 20 percent of Uralkali, the biggest potash fertilizer producer in the world. Although no official transaction price was ever disclosed, it is estimated that Uralchem paid $2.9 billion for the acquisition.

In 2013 Uralchem and LLC Riga Commercial Port completed construction and opened a terminal at the Riga Port in Latvia for bulk fertilizers handling and short-term storage, called Riga Fertilizer Terminal. Uralchem became the controlling shareholder of the facility. A year later, the chemical firm acquired a controlling stake in Latvia's liquid ammonia transshipment terminal SIA Ventamonjaks.

The firm has also sought to increase its presence in African markets in recent years, particularly Zimbabwe, where Uralchem is hoping to acquire a minimum 50 percent stake in Chemplex, the state phosphorus fertilizer producer. Uralchem has also announced the beginning of cooperation Zambia and Angola, where it plans to build a urea plant.

In December 2021 Dmitry Mazepin rewrote his Cyprus-based companies Uralchem Holding and CI-Chemical Invest, controlling “Uralchem”, to Russian jurisdiction at special administrative district on Oktyabrsky Island of Kaliningrad Oblast. In March 2022, Dmitry Mazepin entered into an agreement to sell the Cyprus company Uralchem Freight Limited (UFL), which owns shares in two Latvian companies operating ports in Riga and Ventspils - SIA Riga Fertilization Terminal (RFT) and SIA Ventamoniaks (VA). The buyer was the Swiss company Svizraa SA. The Latvian authorities refused to register the transaction, after which the contract for the sale of the company with Svizraa SA was terminated.

== Production ==
According to company figures, Uralchem has annual production capacities of 3 million tons of ammonia and ammonium nitrate, 1.2 million tons of urea as well as 1 million tons of phosphate and complex fertilizers, accounting for 27.6 percent of ammonium nitrate, 16.9 percent of ammonia and 15 percent of urea production in Russia.

Financial results (in million US$) and production (in kt)
| Year | 2018 | 2017 | 2016 | 2015 | 2014 | 2013 | 2012 | 2011 | 2010 | 2009 |
|---|---|---|---|---|---|---|---|---|---|---|
| Total revenue | 1,757 | 1,601 | 1,390 | 1,746 | 2,028 | 2,265 | 2,423 | 2,080 | 1,389 | 949 |
| Net profit/(loss) | (536) | 533 | 1,166 | (236) | (1,881) | 261 | 665 | 445 | 35 | (97) |
| Total production of fertilizers and ammonia | 6452 | 6321 | 6063 | 5894 | 5645 | 6039 | 6026 | 5093 | 4861 | 4406 |

== Conflict with Togliattiazot shareholders ==
Since taking a minority stake in Togliattiazot, Uralchem has criticized Togliattiazot for a lack of transparency relating to its activities on multiple occasions. Uralchem argues that its management has been repeatedly refused access to Togliattiazot's major shareholders and management to important documents such as protocols and internal orders of the lists of affiliated persons as well as quarterly and annual reports.

The Uralchem leadership has also accused Togliattiazot's majority shareholders Vladimir and Sergei Makhlai of engaging in large-scale fraud involving an export scheme for their ammonia and urea production. According to media reports, the Togliattiazot between 2008 and 2011 had sold its produce in the international markets primarily through Nitrochem Distribution AG, a Swiss trading company owned by Ameropa Holding AG and a main Togliattiazot shareholder, at below market prices. The owner of Ameropa AG, Andreas Zivy, is one of the controlling shareholders of Togliattiazot, along with the Makhlai Family. Nitrochem Distribution then resold the products to independent buyers at market prices. Through the scheme, minority shareholders like Uralchem sustained losses of $550 million, according to Forbes.

Investigations by the Russian authorities led to the freezing of assets and shares of Togliattiazot owned by the majority shareholders worth $2 billion. The court also prohibited Sergei Makhlai from holding senior positions at the company, after which he resigned from the board. In July 2019, Sergei and Vladimir Makhlai as well as Togliattiazot's former CEO Evgeny Korolev and their Swiss partners Andreas Zivy and Beat Ruprecht were sentenced to prison in absentia by the Komsomolsky District Court in Togliatti for a period of 8.5 to 9 years. The court ordered them to pay damages to Togliattiazot in the amount of 77 billion rubles and to Uralchem in the amount of 10 billion rubles.

In November 2021, at the initiative of Uralchem, an extraordinary meeting of shareholders was convened, following which the plant's management bodies came under the control of Uralchem: The Board of Directors was elected, which included five representatives of Uralchem and CEO Anatoly Shablinsky, who previously headed the enterprises that are part of Uralchem.

During 2022-2023, Himaktivinvest (Uralchem structure) increased its stake in Tolyattiazot through auctions. As of February 2023, it owns 93.94% of the shares of Tolyattiazot together with its affiliates.

== Philanthropy ==
The company is running several philanthropic and charitable programs and activities to promote social welfare, culture and education, including providing lab equipment to Perm Polytechnic and hosting concerts. To that end, the company stated that it had increased its financing of charitable projects by 34 percent to 710 million rubles ($11 million).
