= Silvinit =

Russian mining company

Sil'vinit JSC
- Native name: ОАО Сильвинит
- Company type: Public
- Industry: Mineral Fertilizers
- Headquarters: Solikamsk, Russia
- Key people: Yury Grigorevich Syrtsev, (Chairman); Rostyam Khazievich Sabirov, (CEO)
- Products: Potassium chloride, Potassium, Salt
- Revenue: ▲US$ 1.7 Billion (2008)
- Number of employees: 11,245
- Website: www.silvinit.ru

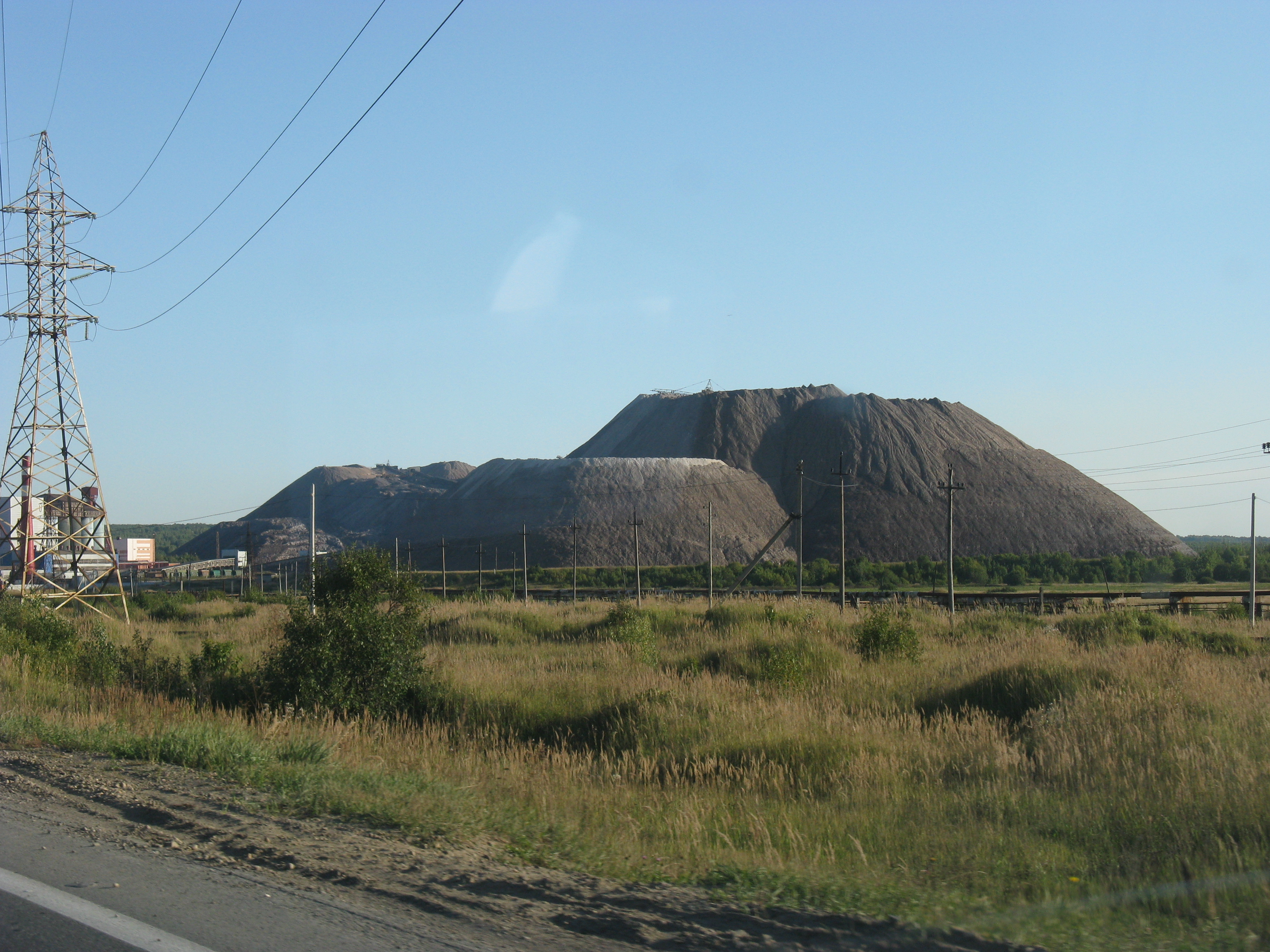
Salt dump in Solikamsk

Silvinit is a Russian company involved in the production of mineral fertilizes. The company delivers its products to all regions of Russia and to over more than 50 countries worldwide, including Brazil, China, India, United States, Southeast Asia and Latin America, among others. It manages its activities through two branches, one in Belarus and one in Germany. Silvinit operates through eight affiliated companies and eight subsidiaries.

In December 2010, Uralkali announced plans to buy Silvinit for $7.8 billion in cash and shares. The merger was approved in February 2011 and finalized in July that same year. Together they form one of the world's largest potash producers.

== Liquidation ==
Date of liquidation is July 28, 2022.

CEO - Shvetsova Marina Vladimirovna.

Founder - PJSC "URALKALI" (100%)
