= Meyer Burger =

Swiss company

Meyer Burger Technology AG
- Type: Public
- Traded as: SIX: MBTN
- Industry: Photovoltaics
- Founded: 1953 (1999 as holding)
- Headquarters: Thun, canton of Bern, Switzerland
- Key people: Franz Richter, chairman of the board, chief executive officer; Katja Madaus, chief sustainability officer; Daniel Menzel, chief operating officer />
- Revenue: 147.2 million Swiss francs (CHF) (FY 2022)
- Number of employees: 1200 (January 2023)
- Website: www.meyerburger.com/en/

Meyer Burger Technology AG is an industrial manufacturer of solar cells and solar modules, headquartered in Gwatt, a district of Thun, Switzerland. The company's registered shares are listed on the SIX Swiss Exchange.

== Company structure ==
=== Headquarters ===
The company headquarters are located in Thun, (Switzerland).

=== Manufacturing solar cells and modules ===
At the German production sites in Thalheim (Bitterfeld-Wolfen) in Saxony-Anhalt (formerly Sovello) and Freiberg in Saxony (formerly SolarWorld), production of heterojunction solar cells and photovoltaic modules began in mid-2021. The following year, the company announced the expansion of production. In October 2022, the company announced a further capital increase of CHF 250 million. This was approved at an extraordinary general meeting on 28 October 2022. The production equipment is developed and built in Meyer Burger’s own equipment building unit in Hohenstein-Ernstthal (Saxony). In January 2024, German media reported plans for closing the Freiberg, Saxony, location and keeping only Bitterfeld-Wolfen open. Meyer Burger already abandoned expansion plans for their Thalheim factory in favor of investing in Colorado Springs, Colorado.

Due to improved investment conditions, Meyer Burger has increased its expansion plans to open a 2 gigawatt solar panel production site in Goodyear, Arizona. In August 2024, Meyer Burger announced that they were putting plans for the Colorado factory on hold, and would refocus on these Arizona operations.

=== Research and development ===
Meyer Burger has R&D units in Switzerland and Germany. More than 15 per cent of all employees work in these units (2022). Working in consortium with Centre Suisse d’Électronique et de Microtechnique, Helmholtz-Zentrum Berlin, Fraunhofer Institute for Solar Energy Systems, and the University of Stuttgart, Meyer Burger is researching perovskite tandem solar cells and developing next-generation solar modules.

In 2019, Meyer Burger became the largest shareholder in "Oxford Photovoltaics Ltd", an Oxford University spin-off in the field of heterojunction and perovskite technology. Oxford PV attempted to unilaterally terminate the cooperation agreement in July 2021.

=== Sales offices ===
Meyer Burger operates sales offices in Europe, the United States, Asia and Australia.

== Share ==
The registered shares have been traded on the SIX Swiss Exchange in Zürich since November 2006 (SIX ticker symbol: MBTN). They are included in the Swiss Performance Index and other stock market indices.

The largest shareholders include (as of June 2023):

- "Sentis Capital PCC (Cell 3)" (Pyotr Kondrashev)
- BlackRock
- Invesco
- Norges Bank
- Zurich Cantonal Bank
- The Vanguard Group
- UBS
- Universal Investment
- J O Hambro Capital Management

== History ==
Hans Meyer founded a mechanical workshop in Hünibach-Eichbühl in early 1951. When Wilhelm Burger became co-owner in 1953, the company, which developed and produced machines for the watch industry, was renamed Meyer & Burger. In 1956 they built a new factory in nearby Steffisburg. From 1960 onwards, they mainly manufactured cut-off machines and a universal machine tool UW1. They were located in Hilterfingen until 1998.

The company was founded in 1953 as a manufacturer of watch stone processing machines and subsequently specialised in sawing machines. In 1999, the company set up a holding structure with the foundation of "Meyer & Burger Holding AG" in Zug and launched the first bandsaw for the solar industry on the market in the same year.

In the course of the growing solar industry, the company began to open up the European, Asian and American markets.

In 2006, the Group was renamed from "Meyer & Burger Holding AG" to "Meyer Burger Technology AG" and its headquarters moved to Baar. The company went public in November 2006.

In 2010, Meyer Burger merged with the previously independent company 3S Industries. 3S Industries had its registered office in Lyss and was founded in 2001. 3S had been listed on the Bern Stock Exchange since 2005. The former competence centres of 3S Industries became business units of Meyer Burger.

In the course of the merger with 3S Industries, Pasan became part of Meyer Burger in 2010. The company focuses on the development and production of test and measurement systems for solar cells and modules. These include solar simulators, which are used by international certification bodies such as TÜV as well as numerous cell and module manufacturers. The company is based in Neuchâtel in Switzerland.

In 2012, the Group headquarters were relocated to Thun following the move into the new building.

Between 2010 and 2012, the Group was significantly enlarged through various corporate takeovers in order to be able to cover the entire value chain (wafer–cell–module) in photovoltaic production with its own production machines. The most important products were diamond wire saws for cutting ultra-thin silicon wafers, coating systems to build functioning solar cells from wafers, and systems for the manufacture of complete solar modules.

"Roth & Rau AG" was renamed "Meyer Burger (Germany) AG" in 2015. The company developed and produced systems and machines for surface processing in the photovoltaic industry and was instrumental in the industrialisation of the so-called PERC (Passivated Emitter and Rear Contact) technology. In addition, the company develops and builds mass production systems for the manufacture of highly efficient solar cells with heterojunction technology.

In the meantime, the corporate structure has been adapted and the focus has been placed on the areas of solar cell production and connection, i.e. on heterojunction cell coating and SmartWire Connection Technology for cell connection. In this context, the entire "Sawing and Cutting Technology" division was sold to "Precision Surfacing Solutions" in May 2019. While the company is still headquartered in Thun, Meyer Burger operates its equipment production and R&D site in Hohenstein-Ernstthal, where Meyer Burger acquired a majority stake in Roth & Rau in 2011.

After a public dispute between the board of directors and the main shareholders, including "Sentis Capital" and "Elysium Capital", shareholder representatives were elected to the top management body and a changed corporate strategy was announced in mid-2020 after eight years of losses. A capital increase of 165 million Swiss francs was carried out to enable a realignment; "Sentis Capital" committed in advance to contribute 50 million Swiss francs.

In May 2025, Meyer Solar halted its U.S. manufacturing operations and shuttered its Arizona manufacturing plant, which opened in January 2024, resulting in the layoff of nearly 300 workers. On June 2, 2025, Meyer Burger Germany filed for insolvency proceedings and halted manufacturing operations there as well. On June 25, 2025, Meyer Burger filed for Chapter 11 bankruptcy protection, stating that its European and U.S. operations have been struggling to compete with Asian-imported solar panels. The company listed assets between $100 million and $500 million and liabilities between $500 million and $1 billion. In September 2025, the company admitted that it was unable to find a buyer for its assets, and that it would sell its solar panel manufacturing equipment to Waaree Energies. However, in March 2026, the company's assets and IP would be sold to California-based Swift Solar for an undisclosed amount.

== Former divisions ==
In the course of a realignment of the company, Meyer Burger has sold some business units and subsidiaries, in particular as of 2018.

The company "3S Industries" with, among others, the business units "3S Modultec" and "3S Photovoltaics" merged with Meyer Burger in 2010 and continued as the business unit "3S Photovoltaics". The brands "3S Modultec" and "Solar Building Technologies" were subsequently created. The business unit was later integrated into Meyer Burger's "Energy Systems" business unit and in 2018 was spun off and sold as a separate company, "3S Solar Plus Ltd."

The "Sawing and Cutting Technology" business unit was sold to "Precision Surfacing Solutions" (PSS) for CHF 50 million at the end of April 2019.

Meyer Burger Group also included "AIS Automation Dresden GmbH" until 2019. It was then sold to S&T.

In the course of the acquisition of "Roth & Rau AG" in 2011, "Roth & Rau Netherlands B.V." also became part of the Meyer Burger Group. The business unit was sold in December 2019. Part of "Roth & Rau AG" was also "Muegge GmbH" which was sold in August 2020.

== See also ==
- List of photovoltaics companies
