= Bulatovo, Krasnovishersky District, Perm Krai =

Bulatovo Булатово
- Settlement
- Location within Perm Krai Location within Russia
- Coordinates: 60°15′N 56°40′E
- Country: Russia
- Region: Perm Krai
- District: Krasnovishersky District
- Time zone: UTC+5:00

Bulatovo (Russian: Булатово) is a rural locality (a settlement) in Krasnovishersky District, Perm Krai, Russia. The population was 522 as of 2010. There are 4 streets.

== Geography ==
Bulatovo is located 34 km southwest of Krasnovishersk (the district's administrative centre) by road. Berezovaya Staritsa is the nearest rural locality.
