= Bulatovo, Alexandrovsky District, Perm Krai =

Bulatovo Булатово
- Village
- Location within Perm Krai Location within Russia
- Coordinates: 59°08′N 57°08′E
- Country: Russia
- Region: Perm Krai
- District: Alexandrovsky District
- Time zone: UTC+5:00

Bulatovo (Russian: Булатово) is a rural locality (a village) in Vsevolodo-Vilvenskoye Urban Settlement, Alexandrovsky District, Perm Krai, Russia. The population was 3 as of 2010.

== Geography ==
Bulatovo is located 35 km west of Alexandrovsk (the district's administrative centre) by road. Ust-Igum is the nearest rural locality.
