= Danilovka, Republic of Bashkortostan =

Danilovka Даниловка
- Village
- Location within Bashkortostan Location within Russia
- Coordinates: 53°20′N 55°40′E
- Country: Russia
- Region: Bashkortostan
- District: Meleuzovsky District
- Time zone: UTC+5:00

Danilovka (Russian: Даниловка) is a rural locality (a village) in Korneyevsky Selsoviet, Meleuzovsky District, Bashkortostan, Russia. The population was 420 as of 2010. There are 6 streets.

== Geography ==
Danilovka is located 62 km north of Meleuz (the district's administrative centre) by road. Yelimbetovo is the nearest rural locality.
