= Danilovka, Sudogodsky District, Vladimir Oblast =

Danilovka Даниловка
- Village
- Location within Vladimir Oblast Location within Russia
- Coordinates: 56°07′N 40°49′E
- Country: Russia
- Region: Vladimir Oblast
- District: Sudogodsky District
- Time zone: UTC+3:00

Danilovka (Russian: Даниловка) is a rural locality (a village) in Lavrovskoye Rural Settlement, Sudogodsky District, Vladimir Oblast, Russia. The population was 1 as of 2010.

== Geography ==
Danilovka is located 32 km north of Sudogda (the district's administrative centre) by road. Spas-Kupalishche is the nearest rural locality.
