= Rosugol =

Rosugol (Russian: Росуголь) was a state-owned coal producer in Russia. It controlled 232 mines, 65 open-cast mines and 68 coal preparation plants. In 1995, it was the fourth largest company in the country by revenue. Yuri Malyshev was the company's chairman.

Rosugol was established in March 1993 by the Russian government. Created as a successor to the Soviet Ministry of Coal Industry, it retained many of its functions. It operated as a national coal monopoly, and its functions included allocating subsidies to mines. As part of the country's transition to a market economy, Rosugol classified mining operation based on their economic viability. Those deemed unlikely to survive market conditions were closed down, with miners being relocated to other regions.

In 1994, the Russian government allocated $2.8 billion on direct subsidies to the sector through Rosugol, or more than 1% of the country's GDP. Part of the support came from the World Bank. In July 1997, the World Bank postponed a $500 million loan to the coal sector, citing a misuse of fund given to Rosugol. Under pressure from the bank, President Yeltsin abolished the state-owned company in November 1997. Its administrative functions were transferred to the Ministry of Fuel and Energy.
