= Bulatovo, Vologda Oblast =

Bulatovo Булатово
- Village
- Location within Vologda Oblast Location within Russia
- Coordinates: 59°06′N 38°53′E
- Country: Russia
- Region: Vologda Oblast
- District: Sheksninsky District
- Time zone: UTC+3:00

Bulatovo (Russian: Булатово) is a rural locality (a village) in Domshinskoye Rural Settlement, Sheksninsky District, Vologda Oblast, Russia. The population was 12 as of 2002.

== Geography ==
Bulatovo is located 37 km southeast of Sheksna (the district's administrative centre) by road. Pestovo is the nearest rural locality.
