= Avtozavodsky City District =

Avtozavodsky City District is the name of several city divisions in Russia. The name literally means "pertaining to an automotive plant".

- Avtozavodsky City District, Nizhny Novgorod, a city district of Nizhny Novgorod, the administrative center of Nizhny Novgorod Oblast
- Avtozavodsky City District, Tolyatti, a city district of Tolyatti, a city in Samara Oblast
Cities in Russia with a city division called "Avtozavodsky"

== See also ==
- Avtozavodsky (disambiguation)
