= Bulatovo, Blagoveshchensky District, Republic of Bashkortostan =

Bulatovo Булатово
- Village
- Location within Bashkortostan Location within Russia
- Coordinates: 55°18′N 56°04′E
- Country: Russia
- Region: Bashkortostan
- District: Blagoveshchensky District
- Time zone: UTC+5:00

Bulatovo (Russian: Булатово; Bashkir: Булат, Bulat) is a rural locality (a village) in Sanninsky Selsoviet, Blagoveshchensky District, Bashkortostan, Russia. The population was 53 as of 2010. There are 2 streets.

== Geography ==
Bulatovo is located 41 km north of Blagoveshchensk (the district's administrative centre) by road. Sanninskoye is the nearest rural locality.
