= Danilovka, Sobinsky District, Vladimir Oblast =

Danilovka Даниловка
- Village
- Location within Vladimir Oblast Location within Russia
- Coordinates: 56°13′N 40°01′E
- Country: Russia
- Region: Vladimir Oblast
- District: Sobinsky District
- Time zone: UTC+3:00

Danilovka (Russian: Даниловка) is a rural locality (a village) in Tolpukhovskoye Rural Settlement, Sobinsky District, Vladimir Oblast, Russia. The population was 13 as of 2010.

== Geography ==
Danilovka is located 30 km north of Sobinka (the district's administrative centre) by road. Kishleyevo is the nearest rural locality.
