= Bulatovo, Abzelilovsky District, Republic of Bashkortostan =

Bulatovo Булатово
- Village
- Location within Bashkortostan Location within Russia
- Coordinates: 53°03′N 58°40′E
- Country: Russia
- Region: Bashkortostan
- District: Abzelilovsky District
- Time zone: UTC+5:00

Bulatovo (Russian: Булатово; Bashkir: Булат, Bulat) is a rural locality (a village) in Almukhametovsky Selsoviet, Abzelilovsky District, Bashkortostan, Russia. The population was 155 as of 2010. There are 3 streets.

== Geography ==
Bulatovo is located 53 km north of Askarovo (the district's administrative centre) by road. Tselinny is the nearest rural locality.
