= Bulatovo, Arkhangelsk Oblast =

Bulatovo Булатово
- Settlement
- Location within Arkhangelsk Oblast Location within Russia
- Coordinates: 62°36′N 39°58′E
- Country: Russia
- Region: Arkhangelsk Oblast
- District: Plesetsky District
- Time zone: UTC+3:00

Bulatovo (Russian: Булатово) is a rural locality (a settlement) in Oksovskoye Rural Settlement of Plesetsky District, Arkhangelsk Oblast, Russia. The population was 314 as of 2010. There are 10 streets.

== Geography ==
Bulatovo is located 27 km southwest of Plesetsk (the district's administrative centre) by road. Novostroyka is the nearest rural locality.
