= Dmitry Mazepin =

Belarusian-Russian businessman (born 1968)

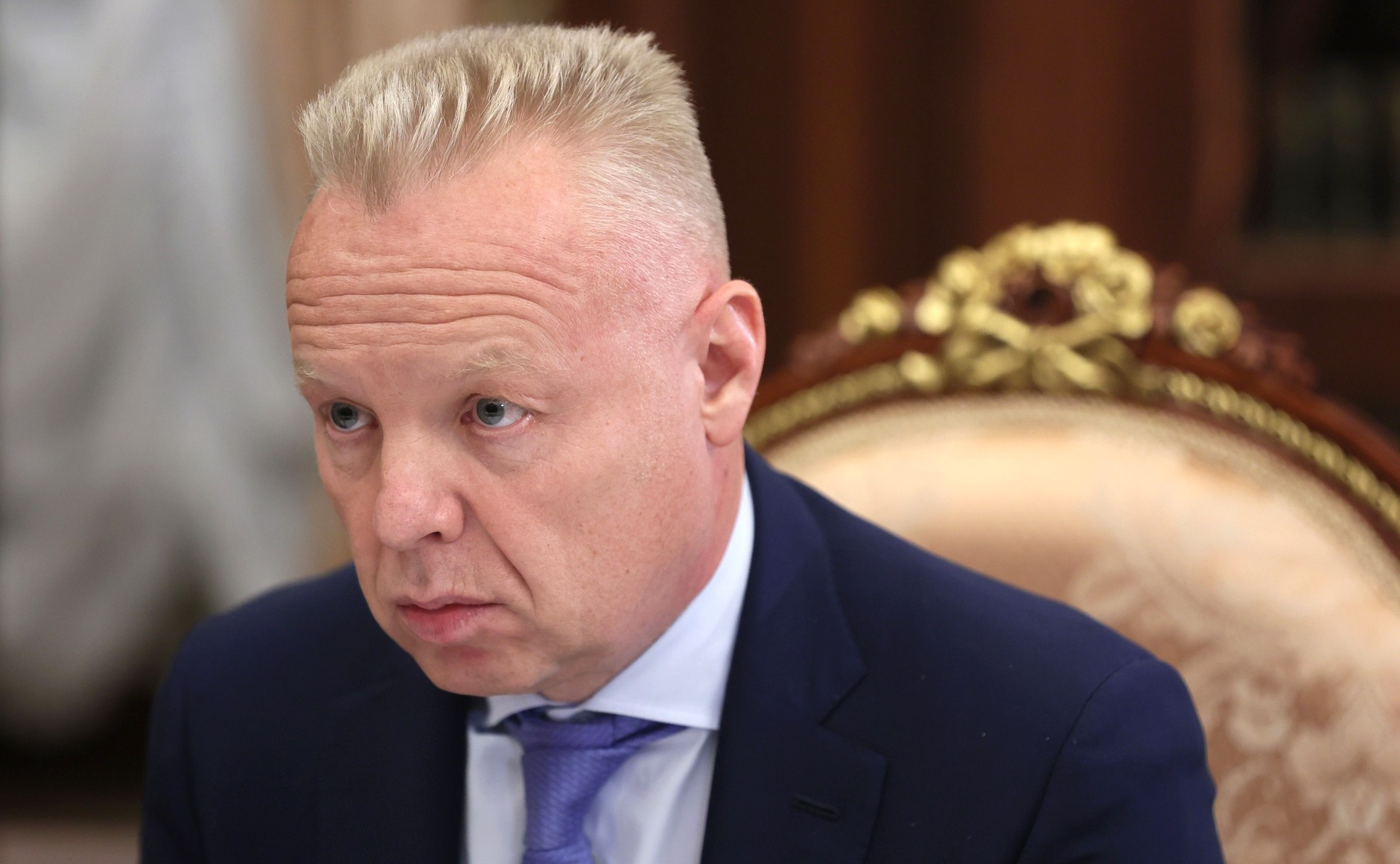
- Mazepin in 2022
- Born: 18 April 1968 (age 58); Minsk, Byelorussian SSR, Soviet Union
- Citizenship: Belarusian; Russian
- Education: Minsk Suvorov Military School; MGIMO University
- Occupation: Co-owner of Uralchem
- Years active: 1985-present
- Children: 5, including Nikita

Dmitry Arkadievich Mazepin (Belarusian: Дзмітрый Мазепін; Russian: Дмитрий Аркадьевич Мазепин; born 18 April 1968) is a Belarusian-Russian oligarch and businessman. He is the former owner and former CEO of Uralchem. As of March 2022, following Russia's invasion of Ukraine, Dmitry Mazepin has been sanctioned by both the European Union and the United Kingdom.

Mazepin has been listed by Forbes magazine among Russia's 200 wealthiest businesspeople. In 2021, his fortune was estimated at $800 million.

== Early life and education ==
Dmitry Mazepin was born on 18 April 1968 in Minsk. He graduated from the Suvorov Military Academy in Minsk in 1985 and subsequently served as a military interpreter in Afghanistan between 1986 and 1988.

In 1992, he graduated from the Department of Economics at MGIMO University, after which he entered the financial sector in Russia and Belarus. He later held executive positions at major Russian private and state‑controlled companies, among them Nizhnevartovskneftegaz and Sibur.

In 2008, he obtained a first‑tier university degree in Organization Management from the Institute for Economics and Management in Saint Petersburg. He earned a PhD from the same institution in 2012, having defended a thesis on the development of a methodical approach to managing the stock‑market potential of an oil‑producing company.

== Business career ==
=== Early beginnings (1992–2002) ===
Mazepin served as CEO of Infistrakh, an insurance company, from 1992 to 1993. For the following two years he held the post of deputy branch manager at Belarusbank, before taking up a number of executive positions at Falkon Bank in 1995. His first major corporate appointment came in 1997, when he was named vice‑president of TNK, the Tyumen Oil Company. TNK had just acquired Nizhnevartovskneftegaz as a subsidiary, and Mazepin was appointed its executive director with a mandate to return the firm to profitability. In a 2009 interview, he stated that he had ultimately succeeded in making Nizhnevartovskneftegaz loss‑free.

Thereafter, Mazepin served as Deputy President of the Board of Flora Moscow Bank between 1998 and 1999, acted as CEO of the coal producer Kuzbassugol, and was subsequently appointed First Deputy Chairman of the Russian Federal Property Fund in 2002.

=== Major appointments (2003–present) ===
Mazepin was appointed president of Sibur, a subsidiary of the major gas producer Gazprom, in 2002, and held the position until 2003. He was invited to take up the role in order to replace Yakov Goldovsky, who had been arrested for illegally removing assets belonging to Gazprom from the company. Mazepin was tasked with returning those assets to Gazprom's operational control and with stabilising what was, at the time, a deeply indebted business. The company underwent extensive technical audits in order to bring idle capacity back into production, and a number of issues affecting worker welfare—including pay arrears and housing conditions—were resolved. Mazepin also sought to diversify Sibur's revenue base, signing a memorandum of understanding on gas processing with Sibneft in 2003.

In 2004, after leaving Sibur, Mazepin established his own company in the sector. Constructive Bureau, a firm controlled by Mazepin, acquired a majority stake in the Kirovo‑Chepetsk Chemicals Plant at a public auction, outbidding Gazprom. Mazepin became chairman of the board of the plant in 2005. Constructive Bureau subsequently acquired stakes in the Perm‑based joint‑stock companies Halogen and Minudobrenia, Berezniki Azot, and the Volgograd‑based Khimprom (transferred to Renova in 2006).

==== Uralchem and Uralkali ====
In 2007, all the assets under Mazepin's control were consolidated to form Uralchem United Chemicals Company, a public joint‑stock company, and Mazepin became chairman of the board of directors of Uralchem.

In June 2008, Mazepin acquired a 75.01 per cent stake in Voskresensk Mineral Fertilizers, an interest he raised to 100 per cent in 2011. That same year, he combined the production facilities of the Kirovo‑Chepetsk Plant and Perm Halogen into Halopolymer, a public joint‑stock company, from whose board he resigned in 2015. The company's principal production assets include the Azot branch in Berezniki, the Perm Mineral Fertilizers branch in Perm, the Kirovo‑Chepetsk Chemical Plant branch in Kirovo‑Chepetsk, and Voskresensk Mineral Fertilizers in the Moscow region.

In December 2013, Mazepin purchased a 20 per cent stake in Uralkali, the world's largest potash producer, in a transaction valued at approximately $2.9 billion. The acquisition was financed by a $4.5 billion loan from VTB. A month earlier, Mikhail Prokhorov had also acquired a 21.75 per cent stake in the company from Suleiman Kerimov. Mazepin assumed operating control of Uralkali at that time, winning a seat on the company's board of directors in March 2014. He also served as deputy chairman of the board of directors of Uralkali from 2014.

As part of his strategy for business development, Mazepin sought to introduce both companies to African markets. Uralchem and Uralkali have held discussions with a number of African countries aimed at increasing production and constructing new plants on the continent. In December 2018, against a background of improving relations between Russia and Kenya, Mazepin met Kenya's President Uhuru Kenyatta to discuss new business deals.

In 2018, Mazepin also met Zimbabwe's President Emmerson Mnangagwa and Zambia's President Edgar Lungu. Zimbabwe and Zambia are expected to become important hubs for fertiliser production as global demand continues to rise. Mazepin met Angola's president João Lourenço in March 2019 to discuss the possible construction of a urea plant in the country with a capacity of 1 million tonnes per year. At the Russia–Africa International Forum held in October 2019, he met Emmerson Mnangagwa and Mozambique's President Filipe Nyusi in order to reaffirm Uralchem's interest in investing in mineral fertiliser production in Zimbabwe, noting that the company is already supplying fertilisers to Zimbabwe, Zambia, Kenya and Angola, and was commencing deliveries to Mozambique.

In March 2022, Dmitry Mazepin reduced his stake in Uralchem to 48 per cent, a level that falls below a controlling interest, and stepped down as CEO of the company.

In October 2024, Mazepin was appointed head of the Russian Aquatics Federation, a body that unifies the former Russian Swimming Federation, the Russian Synchronized Swimming Federation, the Russian Water Polo Federation, and the Russian Diving Federation.

== Philanthropy ==
In 2013, Forbes listed Mazepin among the most charitable Russian billionaires.

According to Forbes and Ria Novosti, in 2012 Mazepin directed $700,000 to charitable causes, most of which went towards a project that purchases cars for large low‑income families in the Kirov region.

Through Uralchem, Mazepin supports a range of charitable activities, among them social programmes for children and veterans, regional development initiatives, education and science programmes, and projects promoting culture and sport.

== Social activities ==
Dmitry Mazepin serves on the board of the All Russian Swimming Federation.

He holds a number of business‑related international memberships. He is a member of the Bureau of the Board of the Russian Union of Industrialists and Entrepreneurs (RSPP) and serves as chairman of the RSPP Commission on Mineral Fertilizer Production and Trading.

He is also chairman of the Russia–Zimbabwe Business Council (the Chamber of Commerce and Industry of the Russian Federation) and chairman of the Russia–Belarus Business Council.

== Controversies and criticism ==
Mazepin was accused of conflicts of interest during his tenure at the Russian Government Property Fund, as he also served on the boards of several enterprises at the time, among them the Krasnoye Sormovo Shipyard and the Kuzbassugol Coal Company, which he was alleged to have favoured in corporate disputes with competitors. In the event, the accusations were never substantiated and remained in the public domain.

In the mid‑2000s, Dmitry Mazepin became embroiled in a dispute relating to Gazprom assets. The assets had been divested in late 2002 by Nikolay Gornovsky, the CEO of the Gazprom subsidiary Mezhregiongaz, without the permission or knowledge of Gazprom's management. A portion of those assets subsequently passed into Mazepin's hands. In 2006, Gazprom succeeded in recovering the assets, which included an 18 per cent equity stake in Azot Chemicals Company.

From 2007 onwards, Mazepin has repeatedly been accused of employing "raider methods" in an attempt to gain control of Togliattiazot (TOAZ), a public company whose executives he has allegedly been pursuing persistently. TOAZ's CEO, Sergey Makhlai, accused Mazepin of making personal threats against him. According to Makhlai, Mazepin threatened to instigate a criminal investigation unless Makhlai agreed to his terms for selling TOAZ to Mazepin. As of 2022, the accusations against Mazepin remain unproven.

Since Uralchem acquired a 7.5 per cent minority stake in TOAZ in 2008, the company's management has accused the Makhlai family of perpetrating a large‑scale fraud involving the sale of its products, principally ammonia and urea, to a foreign distributor at below‑market prices. According to Russian investigators, the scheme is alleged to have operated between 2008 and 2011 through the Swiss‑based company Nitrochem Distribution AG, which purchased the product at depressed prices and then resold it at market value. Investigators estimated that Uralchem suffered damage of up to $500 million as a result.

Although Sergey and Vladimir Makhlai denied the accusations, in July 2019 they were sentenced in absentia to terms of imprisonment, together with their associates: Togliattiazot's former CEO Evgeny Korolev, and their Swiss partners Andreas Zivy and Beat Ruprecht. The court also ordered them to pay compensation of 10 billion rubles to Uralchem and 77 billion rubles to Togliattiazot.

A 2014 news report published in the Russian daily Izvestia claimed that Mazepin intended to acquire the Odesa Port Plant, a major Ukrainian chemical asset. Mazepin has denied that he or Uralchem harbour any interest in the asset.

In May 2015, Uralkali launched a buyback offer for 14 per cent of its stock. Market observers speculated at the time that the buyback would facilitate a merger of Uralkali and Uralchem, a step that would make Mazepin the largest shareholder.

Mazepin and Uralkali submitted a bid for the Force India Formula One team after it entered administration in July 2018. Having been unsuccessful against a Canadian consortium led by Lawrence Stroll, Mazepin openly criticised the bidding process, alleging that the administrators had never contacted him regarding his offer.

On 24 February 2022, Mazepin attended a general meeting between representatives of Russian business and President Vladimir Putin. On 11 March 2022, he sold his controlling stake in Uralchem and stepped down as its chief executive officer.

== Sanctions ==
Mazepin and his son, the Haas F1 racing driver Nikita Mazepin, were added to the European Union sanctions list following the Russian invasion of Ukraine. On 15 March 2022, the United Kingdom followed the EU's lead and added both Dmitry and Nikita Mazepin to its own official sanctions list.

Mazepin has been subject to Swiss sanctions since 16 March 2022. He has been under Australian sanctions since 6 April 2022 and under New Zealand sanctions since 12 October 2022. He has also been subject to Ukrainian sanctions since a decree issued by the President of Ukraine, Volodymyr Zelenskyy, on 24 June 2021.

In March 2024, the General Court of the European Union lifted the sanctions against Nikita Mazepin. The court's ruling stated that the "association" criterion employed in the EU sanctions regime requires the existence of a connection that goes beyond a simple family relationship, a condition that was no longer met after Nikita Mazepin ceased participating in Formula 1 racing.

== Awards ==
Mazepin holds an Certificate of Honor of the Government of the Russian Federation and has been awarded the military Medal "For Courage" and the Medal "For Battle Merit".

On 3 October 2023, he received the Order of Alexander Nevsky in recognition of his labour achievements and many years of diligent work.

On 25 October 2018, he was awarded the Order of Friendship for his labour achievements, active public work and many years of conscientious service.

== Personal life ==
Mazepin is divorced and has two children, Nikita Mazepin and Anastasia Mazepina. Nikita is a racing driver who competed in Formula One for the Haas F1 Team under a multi‑year contract, until the agreement was terminated following Russia's invasion of Ukraine.
