= International Fertilizer Association =

Agricultural association

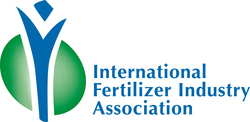
- Headquarters: Paris, France
- Director General: Alzbeta Klein
- Website: www.fertilizer.org

The International Fertilizer Association (IFA) promotes the efficient and responsible production, distribution and use of plant nutrients to enable sustainable agricultural systems. IFA a membership consists of more than 400 entities from producers through traders and distributors, as well as service providers, research organizations, tech startups and non-governmental organizations.

IFA was founded in 1927 in London as the International Superphosphate Manufacturers Association.

== International consultation ==
IFA has consultative status with various agencies of the United Nations (UN), including:

- Food and Agriculture Organization (FAO)
- International Maritime Organization (IMO)
- United Nations Conference on Trade and Development (UNCTAD)
- United Nations Industrial Development Organization (UNIDO)
- United Nations Economic and Social Council (ECOSOC).

The Association also cooperates actively with:

- Consultative Group on International Agricultural Research (CGIAR)
- Organisation for Economic Co-operation and Development (OECD)
- United Nations Environment Programme (UNEP)
- World Bank Group
- World Trade Organization (WTO).

== Board ==
Alzebeta Klein is the CEO and director general of the International Fertilizer Association.
