= Vladimir Makhlai =

- Born: Vladimir Nikolayevich Makhlai; June 9, 1937 (age 89); Gubakha, Perm Oblast, RSFSR, Soviet Union
- Education: Perm Polytechnic Institute
- Occupation: Former CEO of Togliattiazot
- Years active: 1953–present
- Children: 2

Vladimir Nikolayevich Makhlai (Russian: Владимир Николаевич Махлай; born June 9, 1937) is a Russian businessperson. He is the core shareholder in the world’s largest ammonia producer TogliattiAzot, and managed the company in its various incarnations since 1985, as President and CEO for the final 15 years before retiring in May 2011 and stepping down to be replaced by his son, Sergei Makhlai.

In July 2019, the Komsomolsky District Court of Togliatti found Vladimir Makhlai and his son Sergei guilty of large-scale fraud and sentenced them to nine years in prison.

== Career ==
He started his career in 1953 as a turner’s apprentice in his native town Gubakha, moving up to assistant machinist at Gubakhin Chemical Plant in 1961.

He studied for an undergraduate degree in Chemistry and Technology at Perm Polytechnic Institute from 1961 to 1965.

He moved up through the ranks at Gubakhin Chemical Plant between 1966 and 1973, working, in succession, as a machinist, foreman, mechanic, deputy head of production facility, head of compression facility, head of air separation facility. Makhlai became Deputy Director for capital asset construction in 1973.

He became Chief Executive of Gubakhin Chemical Plant in 1974. He was appointed Director General of Togliattiazot in April 1985. He has been living in London, since 2006. He is married, with two sons. The President’s position was abolished at Togliattiazot in May 2011.

== Personal life ==
His son, Sergei Makhlai, was elected Chairman of TogliattiAzot in 2011.

According to the Sunday Times Rich List in 2021, his net worth is £1 billion. Mahklai entered the UK on a golden visa.

== Education and research ==
Makhlai graduated from Perm Polytechnic Institute in 1965. He graduated from Production Organizers’ Department at Ural Polytechnic Institute in 1975.

He authored 35 inventions and research articles in his industry, as well as one monograph.

Full Member of the Academy of Quality Control, Corresponding Member of the Russian Academy of Natural Science, Confirmed Member of the International Academy of Business, Doctor Honoris Causa at the Key Industrial Technology Processes and Methods Association.

== Awards ==
Makhlai is the recipient of Soviet and Russian awards and honors.

- Soviet Medals and Orders:
  - Jubilee Medal "In Commemoration of the 100th Anniversary of the Birth of Vladimir Ilyich Lenin" (1970)
  - Order of the Badge of Honour (1975)
  - Two Orders of the Red Banner of Labour (1981, 1985)
- Russian non-governmental awards:
  - Peter the Great Medal (2000)
  - Order of St. Prince Alexander Nevsky (2008)
- Engineer of the Year for Construction and Construction Industry (2001)
- Honorary Citizen of Togliatti (2001)
- Kremlin Grand and Leader of the Russian Chemical Industry (June 2007, while under investigation)
