= Uralkali =

Russian fertilizer producer

PJSC Uralkali
- Type: Public
- Traded as: MCX: URKA
- Industry: Chemical
- Founded: 1934
- Headquarters: Berezniki, Perm Krai, Russia
- Key people: Vacant (Chairman); Vitaly Lauk (CEO)
- Products: Potash fertilizers
- Revenue: $2.75 billion (2018)
- Operating income: $1.2 billion (2018)
- Net income: $−97 million (2018)
- Total assets: $8.11 billion (2018)
- Total equity: $77 million (2018)
- Number of employees: 12,000
- Website: www.uralkali.com

Uralkali (Russian: Уралка́лий, IPA: [ʊrɐɫ'kalʲɪj]) is a Russian potash fertilizer producer and exporter. It is traded on the Moscow Exchange using the symbol, URKA. The company's assets consist of five mines and seven ore-treatment mills situated in the towns of Berezniki and Solikamsk (Perm Krai, Russia). Uralkali employs about 12,000 people (in the main production unit).

The company’s production facilities are located in the cities of Berezniki and Solikamsk in Perm Krai, with its headquarters situated in Berezniki.

Following the acquisition of OAO Silvinit in 2011, Uralkali became the sole producer of potash fertilizers in Russia.

The company produces standard and granular potassium chloride (KCl), sodium chloride (NaCl in the form of halite), and carnalite. It supplies products (through its own trader Uralkali Trading) to over 60 countries, with the major markets including Brazil, India, China, Southeast Asia, Russia, USA, and Europe. In 2018 Uralkali produced 11.5 million tonnes of potash (KCl) In 2021, the company's revenue amounted to 269 billion rubles.

Uralkali develops Verkhnekamskoye field of potassium and magnesium salts, world's second largest in terms of potash ore reserves. The company's total ore reserves total approximately 8.2 billion tonnes. Uralkali holds the development licences for the Ust-Yayvinsky and Polovodovsky blocks at the Verkhnekamskoye field, which contain ore reserves of 1.291 and 3.074 billion tonnes respectively. Uralkali also holds the development licence for the Romanovsky Block of the Verkhnekamskoye deposit with the estimated reserves of 385 million tonnes of sylvinite ore.

== History ==
- 1934 - Start of construction.
- 1944 - Start of carnallite production.
- 1954 - Launch of the first mine group with the annual capacity of 266,000 tonnes.
- 1964 - Establishment of the Uralkali production association.
- 1968 – Start of construction of the second mine group.
- 1970 - Launch of the second mine group.
- 1974 - Launch of the third mine group.
- 1987 - Launch of the fourth mine group.
- 1993 - Start of privatization of the Uralkali production association and its transformation into OJSC Uralkali.
- 2001 – Construction completion of the Baltic Bulk Terminal.
- 2006 - Shutdown of the first mine group.
- 2007 - Uralkali places its global depositary receipts at the London Stock Exchange.
- 2011 - Merger of OJSC Uralkali and OJSC Silvinit.
- 2014 - Purchase of a license to develop the Romanovsky site of the Verkhnekamskoye deposit.
- 2015 - Delisting of Uralkali GDRs from the London Stock Exchange.
- 2020 - Acquisition of a controlling stake in Uralkali by Uralchem.
- 2021 - Uralkali becomes the title sponsor of the Haas F1 Team.
- 2022 - Haas F1 Team cuts ties with Uralkali.

=== Recent news ===
In December 2010, Uralkali announced plans to buy another Russian potash producer Silvinit; together they would form one of the world's largest potash producers. The merger was finalized in June 2011, with the combined Uralkali accounting for about 20% of the world's potash production.

On 9 November 2012, Chengdong Investment Corp., a unit of the sovereign wealth fund China Investment Corporation, bought bonds from the shareholders with maturation in 2014 which were exchangeable into a stake in Uralkali. Chengdong would be able to convert its investment into a 12.5 percent stake in Uralkali's ordinary shares. In September 2013, the bonds were converted and CIC thus acquired a 12.5% stake in the firm, rumoured to be worth around $2 billion.

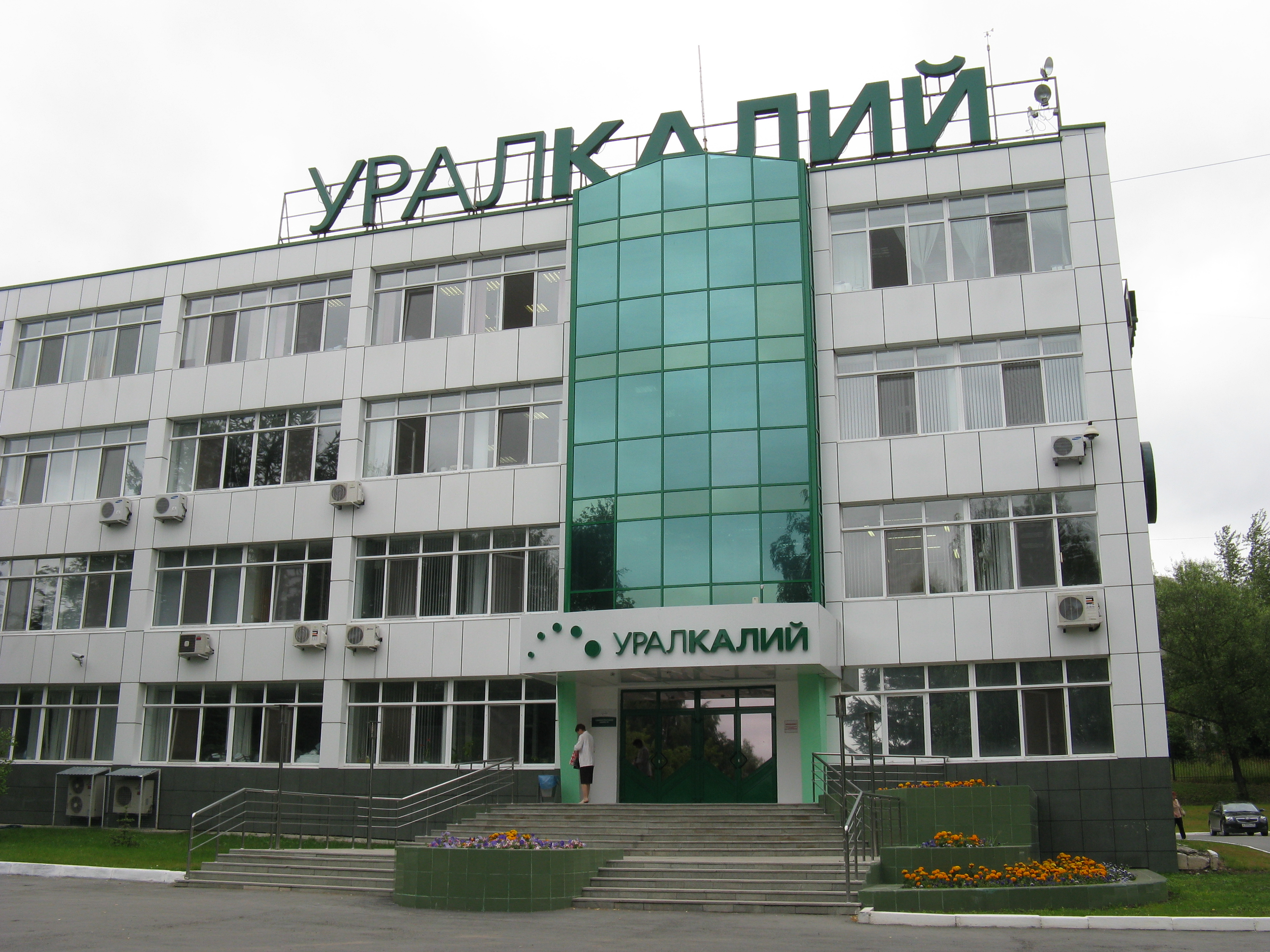
Central office in Berezniki

In June 2012, Green Patrol, a Russian environmental non-governmental organization, listed Uralkali as one of the top 100 polluters in Russia, based on information gathered during the previous years. An expedition organised into the Perm Krai by Green Patrol in 2010 revealed that Uralkali's sinks contained at least 16 harmful elements (including zinc and ammonium), exceeding the maximum permissible levels by 1,850 times. Furthermore, according to Green Patrol's President Roman Pukalov, Uralkali failed to fully disclose a complete list of harmful elements that it routinely rejected into the local river Kama. Roman Pukalov described Kama water as "very polluted", and declared that small rivers around Berezniki had in fact turned into brine, something he had "never seen anywhere else".

On 30 July 2013 Uralkali announced that it was pulling out of the Belarusian Potash Company export JV with Belaruskali, through which it exported potash from 2005 to July 2013, and said it would sell the fertilizer on its own. This move sent shares of potash companies tumbling on speculation that potash prices would plunge. This dispute arose over foreign sales and top executives at Uralkali were accused of a criminal scheme. On 26 August Belarus detained the company's CEO Vladislav Baumgertner after inviting him to Minsk for talks. In September 2013 he was moved from solitary confinement and put under house arrest. Uralkali insists that persecution of its employees by Belarusian officials is politically motivated. On 14 October Russia opened a criminal investigation into Vladislav Baumgertner as well, and investigators announced they will request his extradition from Belarus. In November 2013 Vladislav Baumgertner was extradited to Russia and later put under house arrest. In September 2014 he was released on bail.

In December 2013 Suleiman Kerimov sold his shares (21.75%) to ONEXIM Group, while Dmitry Mazepin's Uralchem acquired 19.99%, both becoming key shareholders in Uralkali.

In November 2015, Uralkali's board approved its latest share buyback program, a move that was expected to result in the delisting of the company's stock in London. Uralkali, which also trades in Moscow, said it will repurchase as much as 6.5 percent of its shares from the open market by the end of March 2016.

On 5 October 2016, Russian President Vladimir Putin issued an order asking the General Attorney of the Federation of Russia Yury Chaika to verify the compliance of Uralkali with the legislation governing planning works and mines filling. Results were to be presented on 1 December 2016, but as of end January 2017 the outcome of the investigation has not been published yet.

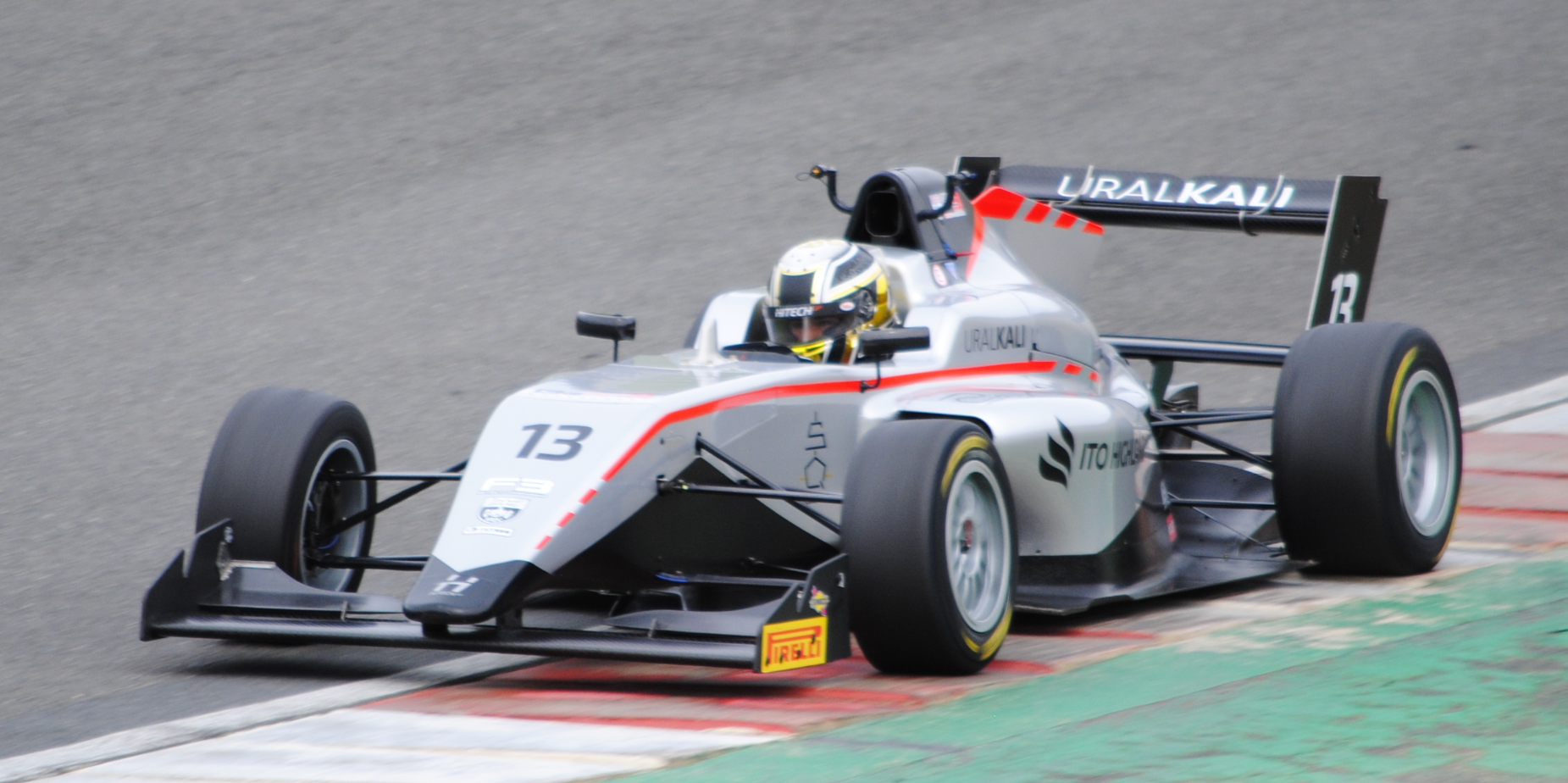
Reece Ushijima's Hitech GP car, sporting Uralkali sponsorship.

In December 2021, Uralkali bought UPI Norte, Brazilian holding and shareholder of FertGrow S.A., local major distributor of fertilizers.

In December 2021, Uralkali-Invest of Uralkali made a buyback of 3,4% of equity shares of Uralchem. By the beginning of 2022, the total of 22.36% of Uralkali voting shares is on the balance of Uralkali-Invest. Before in 2021, the investment division of Uralkali has also acquired 18,5% of equity capital of Uralchem from Dmitry Lobiak, Mazepin's business partner.

== Owners and top management ==
By 2000, Dmitry Rybolovlev gained complete control over Uralkali, consolidating over 50% of the shares. By October 2006, he became chairman of the board of directors and in June 2010 owned approximately 65.5% of the company's shares. In early 2011, Rybolovlev disposed of his shares.

As of April 2011, the company was owned by the following Russian businessmen: Suleyman Kerimov (25%), Alexander Nesis (17.7%), Filaret Galchev (15%), and Alexander Mamut (3.5%), while all other shares were in free float.

At the end of December 2013, 21.75% of the company's shares were held by Mikhail Prokhorov's ONEXIM Group, 19.99% by Dmitry Mazepin's Uralchem, 12.5% by the Chinese Chengdong Investment Corporation, and the rest was in free float. On 23 December 2013, Dmitry Osipov, the former deputy board chairman of Uralchem, was appointed chief executive officer of the company.

Since September 2017, Vitaly Lauk has been the Technical Director and member of the management board of the company. As of 7 March 2018, the shareholding structure of PJSC Uralkali was as follows: 5.23% shares were in free float, 20% were owned by Rinsoco Trading Co. Limited (registered in Cyprus and controlled by Dmitry Lobyak), 20.1% belonged to Uralchem (controlled by Dmitry Mazepin), and 54.77% were quasi-treasury shares (on the balance of the subsidiary Uralkali-Technology).

Since December 2020, 81.47% of shares belong to the holding Uralchem. Vitaly Lauk was appointed as CEO of Uralkali as part of acquisition by new major shareholder effective on 4 December 2020.

== Operations ==
Uralkali develops the Verkhnekamskoye potassium and magnesium salt deposit, one of the world's largest. A substantial part of natural potassium salt is processed into a commercial product, potassium chloride, which is used as a fertiliser applied either directly to the soil or as an ingredient of compound NPK fertilisers. In addition, potash is used in other industries such as chemical, petrochemical, food, and pharmaceutical.

=== Performance indicators ===
The company accounts for a significant share of global potassium chloride production with 80% of the company's products being exported overseas. The main buyers are Brazil, India, China, Southeast Asia, Russia, the US and the EU.

The company's production volume in 2020 was 11.3 million tonnes of KCl. As of late 2020, Uralkali employed about 12,700 people in the main production unit.

The company's net revenue for 2020 amounted to $2,151 million, while the 2020 EBITDA was $1,222 million.

== Carbon footprint ==
Uralkali reported total CO2e emissions (direct + indirect) for the twelve months ending 31 December 2020 at 1,704 Kt (-6.3 /-0.4% y-o-y).

Uralkali's annual total CO2e emissions (direct + indirect) (in kilotonnes)
Dec 2017	Dec 2018	Dec 2019	Dec 2020
1,784	1,789	1,710	1,704

== Sponsorship ==
Uralkali was a minor sponsor for Sahara Force India F1 Team and its rebranded team in 2018 season.

In 2021, it was announced that Uralkali would become the title sponsor of Haas F1 Team after Nikita Mazepin, son of Dmitry Mazepin, signed with the team for the 2021 season. Uralkali also sponsors Hitech GP's cars in the GB3 Championship.

In February 2022, as a consequence of the 2022 Russian invasion of Ukraine, Haas removed the branding of its sponsor Uralkali from its cars and equipment and eventually terminated Uralkali's sponsorship contract, as well as Mazepin's driver contract, which was based on the sponsorship deal, in March. In August 2024, it was reported that Haas has to reimburse US$9 million to Uralkali for the cancelled sponsorship contract by a Swiss arbitrator two months prior. This resulted in Dutch bailiffs and police entering the Haas paddock during the 2024 Dutch Grand Prix weekend to value their assets for Uralkali to potentially seize, should the company not receive payment by 26 August. On 23 August, Haas team owner Gene Haas confirmed the team has made the payment but it was complicated by the Russian sanctions. On 26 August, Uralkali confirmed the receipt of the payment and Haas was allowed to leave the country.
