= Altayskoye, Altaysky District, Altai Krai =

Altayskoye Алтайское
- Selo
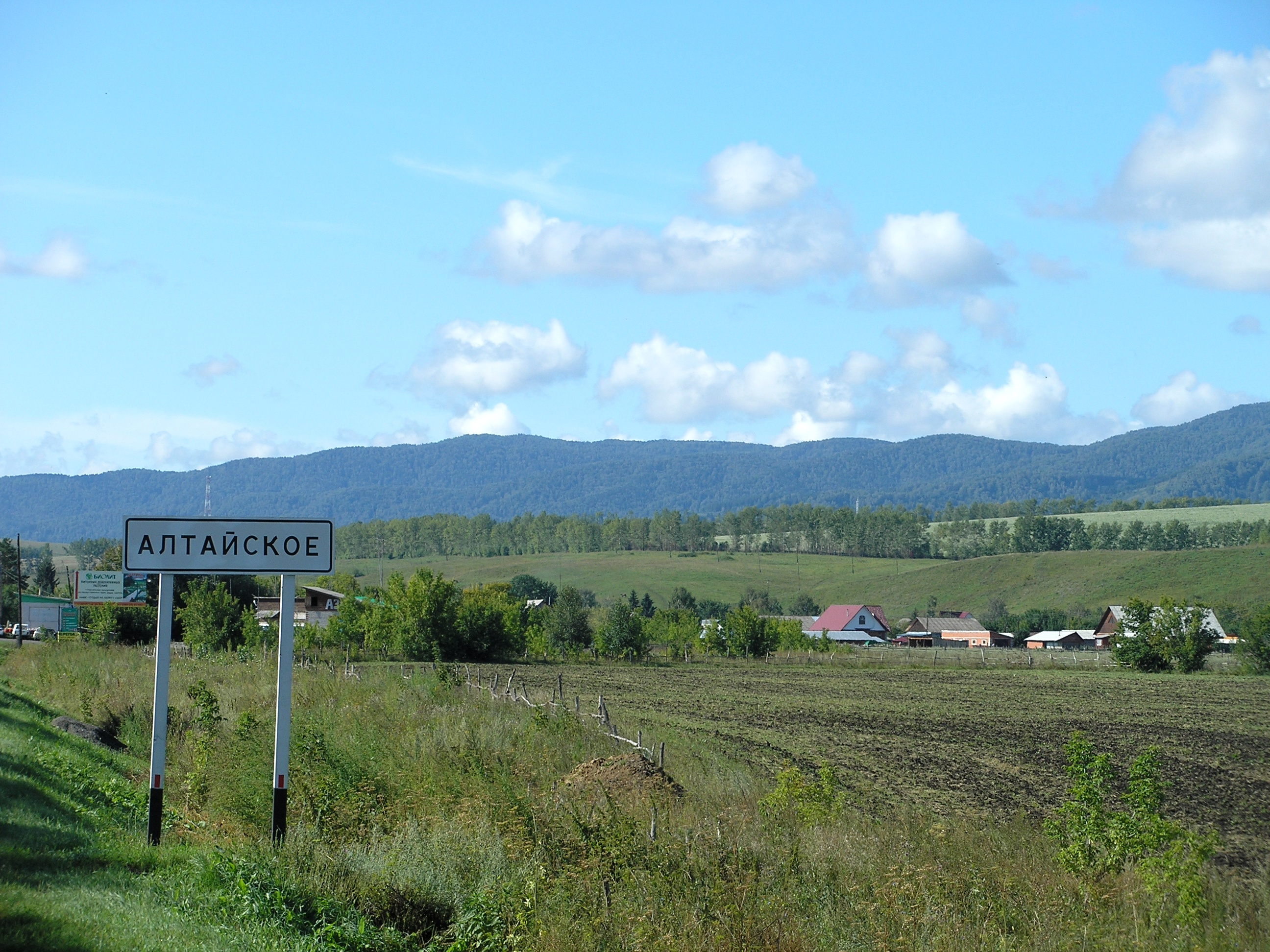
- Interactive map of Altayskoye
- Location of Altayskoye Altayskoye (Altai Krai)
- Coordinates: 51°57′40″N 85°20′20″E
- Country: Russia
- Federal subject: Altai Krai
- Administrative district: Altaysky District
- SelsovietSelsoviet: Altaysky Selsoviet
- Founded: 1808
- Elevation: 288 m (945 ft)

Population (2010 Census)
  - Total: 8,248
  - Estimate (2025): 14,198 (+72.1%)

Administrative status
  - Capital of: Altaysky District, Altaysky Selsoviet

Municipal status
  - Municipal district: Altaysky Municipal District
  - Rural settlement: Altaysky Selsoviet Rural Settlement
  - Capital of: Altaysky Municipal District, Altaysky Selsoviet Rural Settlement
- Time zone: UTC+7 (MSK+4)
- Postal code: 659650–659653
- OKTMO ID: 01602407101

Altayskoye (Russian: Алтайское) is a rural locality (a selo) and the administrative center of Altaysky District of Altai Krai, Russia. Population: 13,713 (2010 census); 13,962 (2002 census); 12,774 (1989 Soviet census).
