= Altaysky District, Altai Krai =

Altaysky District Алтайский район (Russian)
- District
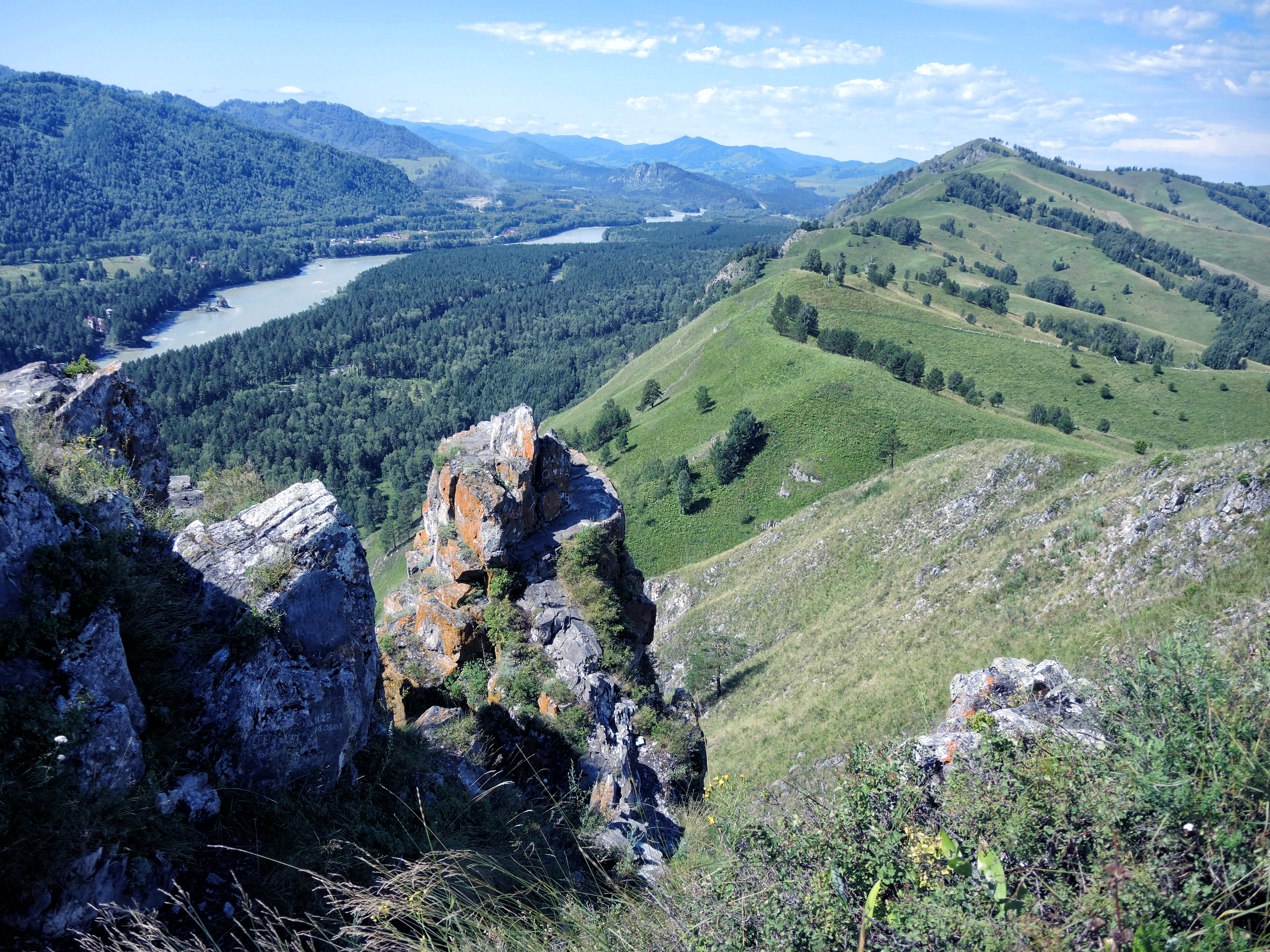
- Devil Mountain, Aya Reserve, Altaysky District

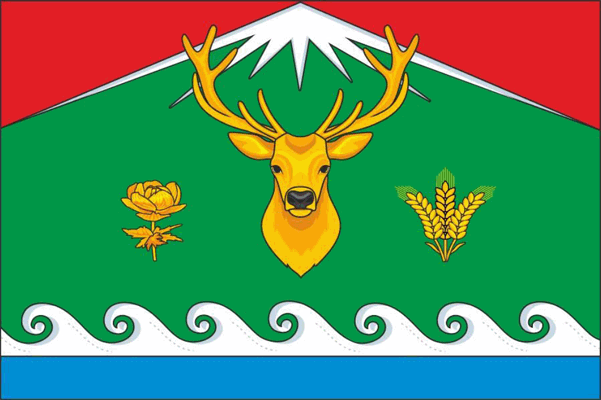
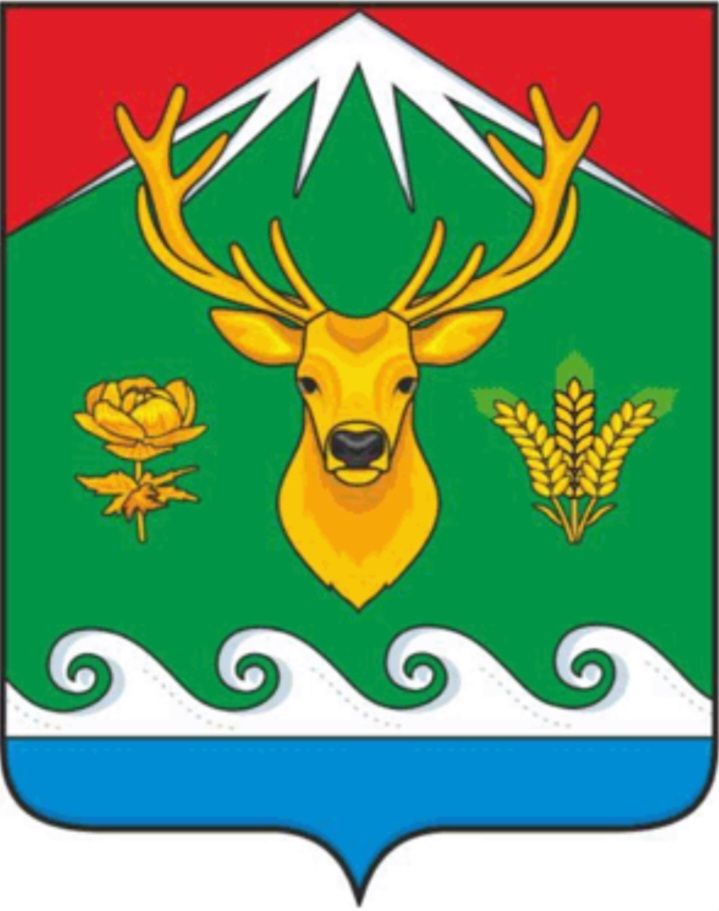
- Flag Coat of arms
- Location of Altaysky District in Altai Krai
- Coordinates: 51°56′N 85°19′E
- Country: Russia
- Federal subject: Altai Krai
- Established: 1925
- Administrative center: Altayskoye

Government
  - Type: Local government
  - Leader: Victor Tyryshkin

Area
  - Total: 3,490 km^{2} (1,350 sq mi)

Population (2010 Census)
  - Total: 25,645
  - Density: 7.35/km^{2} (19.0/sq mi)
  - Urban: 0%
  - Rural: 100%

Administrative structure
  - Administrative divisions: 10 selsoviet
  - Inhabited localities: 25 rural localities

Municipal structure
  - Municipally incorporated as: Altaysky Municipal District
  - Municipal divisions: 0 urban settlements, 10 rural settlements
- Time zone: UTC+7 (MSK+4)
- OKTMO ID: 01602000
- Website: http://altadm.ru/

Altaysky District (Russian: Алта́йский райо́н) is an administrative and municipal district (raion), one of the fifty-nine in Altai Krai, Russia. It is located in the southeast of the krai. The area of the district is 3,400 square kilometers (1,300 sq mi). Its administrative center is the rural locality (a selo) of Altayskoye. Population: 25,645 (2010 census); 26,984 (2002 census); 26,287 (1989 Soviet census). The population of Altayskoye accounts for 53.5% of the district's total population.

== Geography ==
Altaysky District is located in the southeast of Altay Krai, on the border with the Altai Republic. The area is on the transitional piedmont between the forest steppe of the West Siberian Plain to the west and the Altai Mountains to the southeast. The Katun River runs south to north along the eastern border of the district, about 100 km upstream from where the Katun meets the Ob River. Altaysky District is 150 km southeast of the regional city of Barnaul, and 3,050 km east of Moscow. The area measures 75 km (north-south), and 75 km (west-east); total area is 3,490 km2 (about 2% of Altai Krai). The administrative center is the town of Altayskoye in the north-center of the district.

The district is bordered on the northwest by Smolensky District, Altai Krai, on the northeast by Sovetsky District, Altai Krai, on the east by Mayminsky District of Altai Republic, and on the southwest by Soloneshensky District.

== History ==
The first small settlement of Russians occurred with the founding of Lower Kayancha in 1796. The other main villages were settled shortly thereafter (between 1802 and 1806). In the early 1900s, the royal court advanced funds to build a horse-drawn carriage road from Biysk south through the district to Mongolia; this road became the Chuysky Highway. Altai District was formally founded on May 27, 1924.

== Economy ==
The district's economy centers on agriculture, primarily livestock and the related forage crops. The flat plains of the district support grain and sunflower crops, and there is a fish-cultivation center. In recent years, tourism has become more of a focus, with over 10,000 visitors in recent summers drawn by the summer camps and a new tourist-recreational area called "Turquoise Katun".
