= Top Gear series 2 =

Top Gear
- Series 2
- Starring: Jeremy Clarkson; Richard Hammond; James May; The Stig
- No. of episodes: 10

Release
- Original network: BBC Two
- Original release: 11 May – 20 July 2003

Series chronology
- ← Previous; Series 1 Next → Series 3

Series 2 of Top Gear, a British motoring magazine and factual television programme, was broadcast in the United Kingdom on BBC Two during 2003, consisting of ten episodes between 11 May and 20 July; a compilation episode, titled "Best of Top Gear", was broadcast after the series concluded on 27 July, featuring the best moments of the previous two series. It was the first series to feature James May, who was brought in to replace Jason Dawe following the first series, and the first to credit the programme's anonymous driver, "The Stig", as an additional presenter; though not under their actual identity. The insider dealing segment from series 1 was retained for this series but was phased out completely for the series three.

The series's most notable elements included a race between several noted science fiction franchises, which was later cut out of re-runs for licensing reasons, and a contest to name the greatest car of all times; as of 2023, only two segments of this are not included for re-runs, one for legal reasons, the other for unknown reasons.

== Episodes ==
No. overall	No. in series	Reviews	Features/challenges	Guest(s)	Original release date	UK viewers (millions)
11	1	Smart Roadster • Bowler Wildcat • Bentley T2 • McLaren F1	Drag racer jet engine incinerates Nissan Sunny	Vinnie Jones	11 May 2003	3.15
Clarkson compares the Smart Roadster to its rivals - the Volkswagen Beetle Cabriolet and the Ford Street Ka. New presenter James May is given the task of reviewing his own Bentley T2. Hammond tests out the Bowler Wildcat, while using a drag racer's engine to burn his least favourite things. Finally, Top Gear introduces its Greatest Car competition with Murray Walker arguing his case for the McLaren F1, whilst Vinnie Jones sets a lap in the Liana. Note: This episode marked the beginning of an on-screen partnership between Clarkson, Hammond and May of 21 years across both Top Gear and The Grand Tour car programmes.
12	2	Rolls-Royce Phantom • Rover 3½ Litre (P5B) • BMW M3 • Audi S4 • Jaguar E-Type	Fastest political party	Jamie Oliver	18 May 2003	3.28
Luxury is the subject of Clarkson's review for the Rolls-Royce Phantom, while Hammond road tests the Rover P5B 3½ Litre. Meanwhile, there is a comparison test between the Audi S4 and the BMW M3, alongside a race to see which British political party is the fastest. Elsewhere, actor Chris Barrie nominates the Jaguar E-Type as the greatest car ever made, while Jamie Oliver seeks to serve up a fast time in the reasonably priced car.
13	3	Volkswagen Touareg • Lexus SC430 • Hyundai Coupe • BMW Z8 • Perodua Kelisa • Ford Mustang	Country with fastest supercar	David Soul	25 May 2003	2.98
Clarkson reviews the Volkswagen Touareg and BMW Z8 Alpina, before discussing why he is nominating the classic Ford Mustang as the greatest car made. May road tests the Perodua Kelisa, while Hammond tests out the Hyundai Coupé. Elsewhere, Top Gear's stripped down Jaguar XJS is given a nitrous injection to make it faster than modern supercars, while Starsky and Hutch's David Soul proves how hazardous he is to the Liana's lifespan.
14	4	Jaguar R Coupe • Jaguar Mk II • Jaguar XJR • Jaguar XKR-R • Aston Martin DB7 GT • Black Cab (Austin FX4)	How far can you drive until you become bored in a Jaguar XJR?	Boris Johnson	1 June 2003	3.23
Jaguar is the theme of the episode, as Clarkson road tests the Jaguar XJR, and compares the Aston Martin DB7 GT with the racing version of the Jaguar XKR. May pays homages to the 1953 Le Mans Jaguar C-Type, while Hammond gives praises towards the 1960s Jaguar Mark II. Renowned chef A.A. Gill nominates the Black Cab as the greatest car to be made, while the Liana is in the hands of Boris Johnson for a lap.
15	5	Porsche 911 Turbo • Ford Street Ka • Triumph TR6 • Renault Clio V6 • Land Rover	Rally pit crew vs. women getting ready for a night out	Anne Robinson	8 June 2003	3.33
Clarkson reviews the Porsche 911 Turbo and the 911 Carrera 4S, alongside the Renault Clio V6, while May looks back to the Triumph TR6. Meanwhile, Hammond meets Britain's biggest car bore, pits a rally pit crew team with a challenge, and offers his nomination of the Land Rover as the greatest car ever made. Finally Anne Robinson is in the Liana and proving she isn't the weakest link on the track.
16	6	Subaru Impreza WRX STI • Mitsubishi Lancer Evolution VIII • Vauxhall VX220 Turbo • Peugeot 206 GTI • Fiat 500	Land speed record for caravan towing	Richard Whiteley	15 June 2003	2.46
Clarkson struggles to like either the Subaru Impreza WRX STI or the Mitsubishi Lancer Evolution VIII, whilst reviewing the Vauxhall VX220 Turbo. Meanwhile, Hammond reviews the Peugeot 206 GTi with a track day excursion, May tries to set a new land-speed record for a caravan, and Nick Mason of Pink Floyd nominates the Fiat 500 as the greatest car ever made. Finally, Richard Whiteley proves himself the slowest in the Liana.
17	7	Koenigsegg CC8S • Renault Mégane • Hummer H1 • Hummer H2 • Rolls-Royce Silver Cloud	Crash testing the Megane with a real driver	Neil Morrissey	22 June 2003	3.61
Clarkson tests out a new fast car in the Koenigsegg CC8S, and reviews the differences between the Hummer H1 and Hummer H2. Hammond tests the safety of the Renault Mégane in a simulated crash test and the practicality of the Talon riot control vehicle. Elsewhere, broadcaster Stuart Hall nominates the greatest car ever made as the Rolls-Royce Silver Cloud, and Neil Morrissey attempts a lap time in the reasonably priced car. Note: Stuart Hall's film segment was later removed in reruns, but, due to his 2013 conviction for sexual offences, has not been restored to the episode unlike other Greatest Car films since this series's episodes were made available on iPlayer in 2021; the end credit sequence is also mostly omitted except the title card at the end.
18	8	Nissan 350Z • Alfa Romeo 147 GTA • Citroën DS • Convertibles: (Citroën C3 Pluriel • Mercedes-Benz CLK500 Convertible • Audi A4 Cabriolet • Daihatsu Copen • Volkswagen Beetle Cabriolet)	The Race for the Universe	Jodie Kidd	6 July 2003	3.76
Hammond and May test out a number of cabriolets - the Volkswagen Beetle Cabriolet, the Mercedes-Benz CLK500 convertible, the Audi A4 cabriolet, the Citroën C3 Pluriel, and the Daihatsu Copen. Meanwhile, Clarkson reviews the Nissan 350Z and the Honda Civic Type R, May nominates the Citroën DS as the greatest car, and there is a race between noted sci-fi characters and species. Finally, Jodie Kidd is the latest star to do a lap in the Liana. Note: For licensing reasons, the “Race for The Universe” challenge was removed from the episode for future reruns. In addition, the Citroen DS film was removed from future reruns of the episode, but not been restored after episodes were made available on iPlayer in 2021.
19	9	Vandenbrink Carver • Volvo S60 R • GM HyWire • Audi Quattro	Drive Vauxhall Signum from the rear seat	Patrick Stewart	13 July 2003	2.91
May takes a look at the revolutionary GM Hywire which runs on a mixture of hydrogen and oxygen. Clarkson and Hammond reviews the Vandenbrink Carver and Volvo S60 R, while there is a test to see if a Vauxhall Signum can be driven from the rear seat. Elsewhere, footballer Graeme Le Saux nominates the greatest car as the Audi Quattro, while Patrick Stewart drives on the starship "Liana".
20	10	TVR T350C • Overfinch Range Rover • Cadillac Sixteen • Volkswagen Phaeton	Fastest disabled driver	Alan Davies	20 July 2003	2.92
Hammond races the TVR T350C against a Harrier jump jet, while May gives his opinion on the Cadillac Sixteen concept car. Clarkson takes to reviewing the Volkswagen Phaeton, while racing the Overfinch 580S against a Mercedes-Benz SLK320. Meanwhile, there's a race to find Britain's fastest disabled driver, and the greatest car ever made is announced, and Alan Davies takes to a "mildly damp" track as the latest star in the Liana. Note: This episode was originally themed around tuned-up cars, but was not implemented for unknown reasons.

== Best-of episodes ==
Total	No.	Title	Feature	Original air date
S1	CE	The Best of Top Gear: 2002–2003	Best Moments from Series 1–2	27 July 2003
A look back at some of the best moments from last two series, including a look at what faith was the fastest around the track, and whether some grannies managed to do some Doughnuts.

== Notable events ==
=== Presenter change ===
After the first series had concluded, producer Andy Wilman became concerned with the involvement of motoring enthusiast Jason Dawe. Although a noted exponent of used cars and getting deals on second-hand cars, his segment was felt to not work well with the new format of Top Gear, with Wilman himself admitting that he was not "working out". As a result, Dawe was fired from the programme, resulting in the decision to recruit James May to the programme prior to filming of the second series.

=== Removal of controversial films ===
Following the original broadcast of the second series in 2003, the BBC re-edited future reruns with the "Greatest Car" segments removed from episodes - these featured films by various celebrities promoting the car they felt was the greatest in their opinion. When the segment was brought back into the original episodes for BBC iPlayer in 2021, two separate films were not restored - one for the Citroen DS, and the other for the Rolls-Royce Silver Cloud. While the former footage, featuring James May, was not returned for unknown reasons, the second was not returned as this film featured since-disgraced entertainer Stuart Hall, who was convicted of historical sex offences against children in 2013.
