= Monteverdi Palm Beach =

Concept car

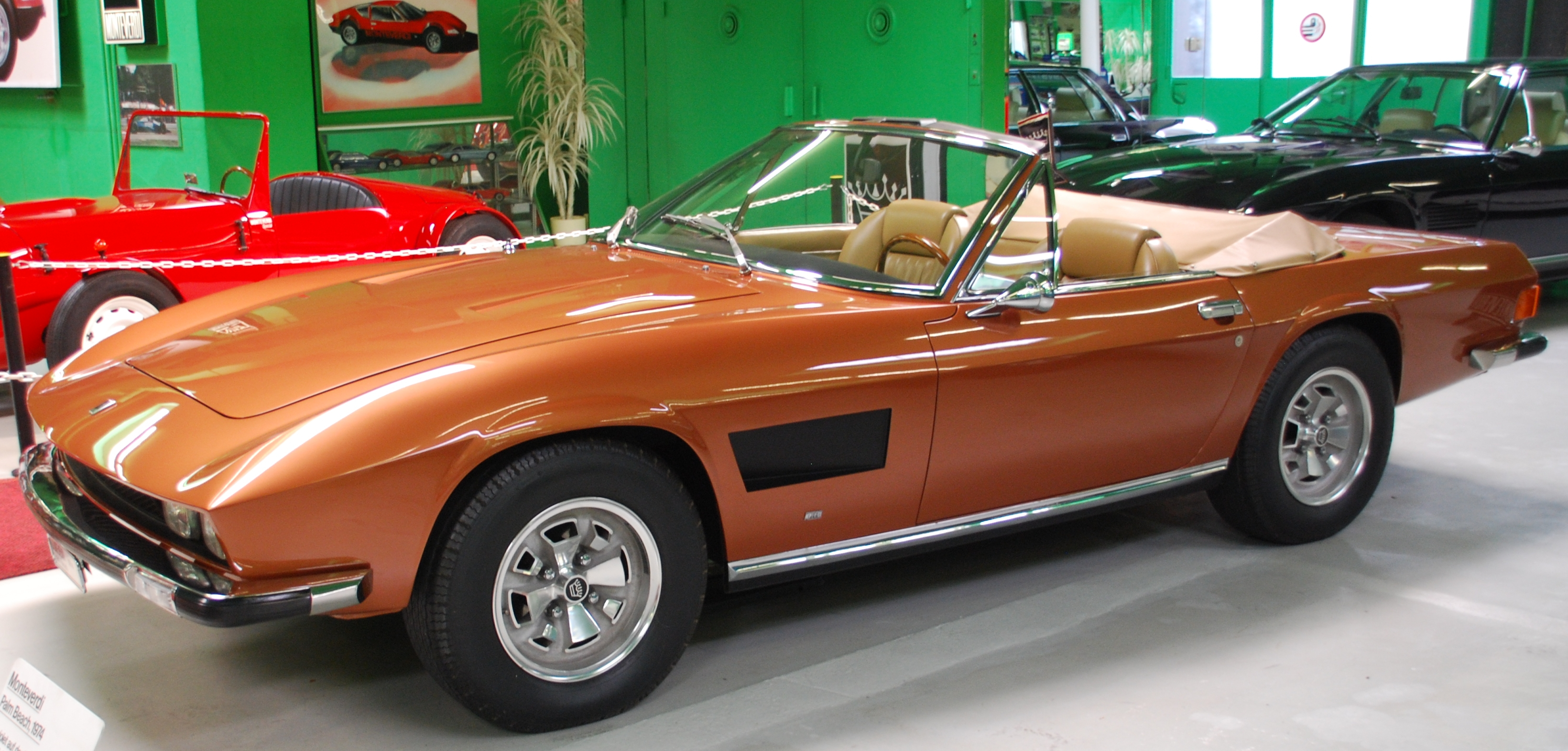

Overview
- Manufacturer: Monteverdi
- Production: 1975; 1 made
- Assembly: Switzerland: Basel

Body and chassis
- Body style: 2-door convertible
- Layout: FR layout
- Related: Monteverdi High Speed 375C

Powertrain
- Engine: 440 cu in (7.2 L) Chrysler RB-series V8
- Transmission: 3-speed TorqueFlite automatic

Dimensions
- Wheelbase: 2,520 mm (99.2 in)
- Length: 4,600 mm (181.1 in)
- Width: 1,795 mm (70.7 in)
- Height: 1,230 mm (48.4 in)
- Curb weight: 1,805 kg (3,979 lb)

The Monteverdi Palm Beach is a car built by Monteverdi in March, 1975 on a shortened Monteverdi High Speed 375C chassis. It was first shown at the Geneva Motor Show in the same year. The car never went into production and remained a one-off.

== History ==
The Palm Beach was first presented to the public at the Geneva Motor Show in March 1975. The exterior featured copper-coloured paint while the interior was finished in cream-coloured leather. The purchase price of the Palm Beach was given as 124,000 Swiss francs.

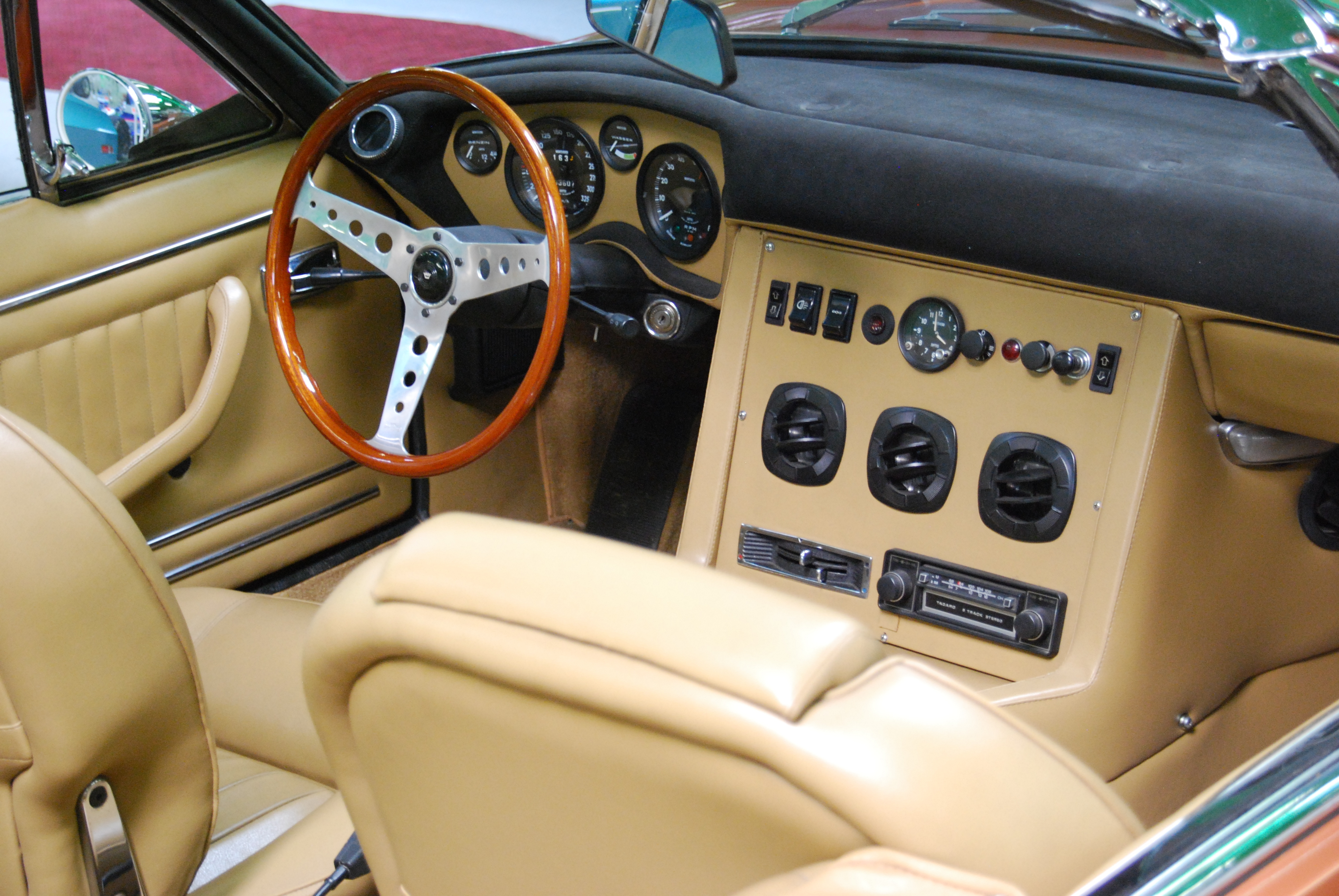
Interior

In the press, the opinion was that the Palm Beach was the convertible version of the Monteverdi Berlinetta. This was, however, inaccurate as the Palm Beach was directly based on the four-years older High Speed 375 C. The Palm Beach was the second convertible model built by Monteverdi on a High Speed chassis. The first featured different styling cues.

On the exterior the Palm Beach took on the design cues of the Berlinetta, especially its low front end with the narrow radiator grille and the twin square headlamps, while the taillights were sourced from a Triumph TR6. Otherwise, the Palm Beach was mostly similar to the 375 C not only in chassis but also the drivetrain. This included a conventional 440 cu in (7.2 L) V8 engine from Chrysler, also found in the High Speed 375 L, instead of the 7.0 L Hemi used in the Berlinetta. The Chrysler 440 V8 produced 300 hp (224 kW) and 449 lb⋅ft (609 N⋅m) of torque.
