= Jason Dawe (presenter) =

English journalist and television presenter

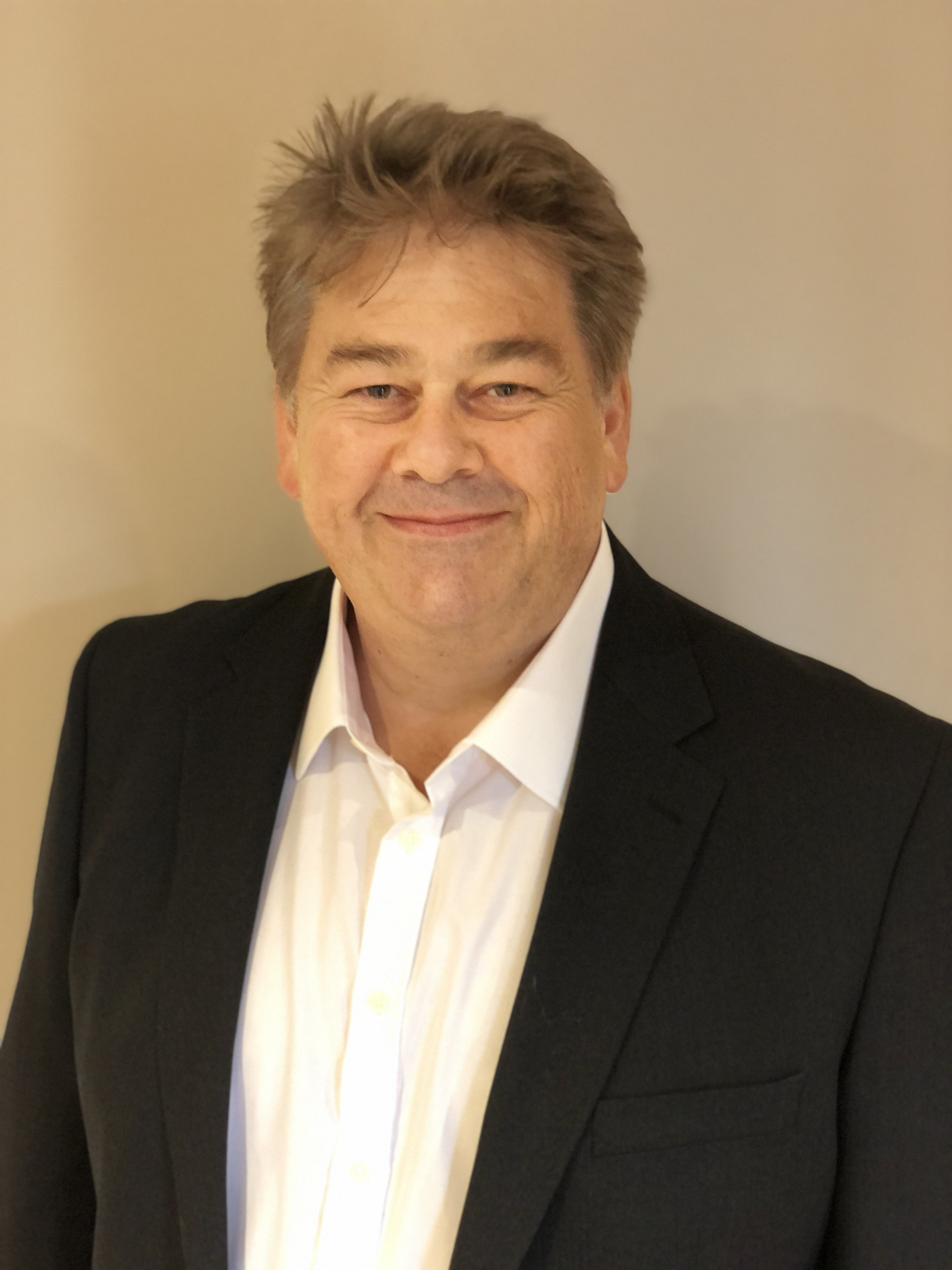
- Dawe in 2021
- Born: Jason Andrew Dawe; 4 May 1967 (age 59); Camelford, Cornwall, England
- Occupations: Journalist; television presenter
- Television: Top Gear; Used Car Roadshow

Jason Andrew Dawe (born 4 May 1967) is an English journalist and television presenter. Brought up in Cornwall, Dawe worked at car dealerships and as a motoring industry trainer; he had been a long-time columnist of the motoring section of The Sunday Times. He also presented the first series of the rebooted Top Gear on BBC Two alongside Jeremy Clarkson and Richard Hammond before being replaced by James May from the next series of the show onwards.

== Journalism ==
Dawe is a regular columnist in The Sunday Times motoring section, where he has written extensively about used cars. Together with Nick Rufford of The Sunday Times he has also made many video broadcasts of car reviews. He writes for many other motoring magazines and is a regular contributor to radio and TV shows as a motoring expert.

In addition to this, Dawe has also been occasionally known to write in the Automobile Association magazine.

== Television career ==
Initially, Jeremy Clarkson wanted James May to present the rebooted series of Top Gear; however, May was rejected by the BBC, with Dawe agreeing to present the first series alongside Clarkson and Richard Hammond.

When May wished to present the show for the second series due to the increasing popularity of the programme, Clarkson thought about Dawe staying and to have four presenters. However, his co-presenter Richard Hammond was close to being fired by BBC management alongside Dawe. Nevertheless show executive producer Andy Wilman strongly supported Hammond's position on the show at the time, stating later in Top Gear magazine, "There was no doubt that Richard would stay”.

Following his departure from Top Gear, Dawe returned to his presenting career in 2005, appearing on ITV's Used Car Roadshow with Penny Mallory until the programme was cancelled in 2007. From 2009 to 2010, he presented Classic Gear alongside Mallory and Alice Crocker, a show about classic cars. Dawe went on to present the 2020 Body Shop Awards, reuniting with Mallory again.
