= Cadillac Sixteen =

Concept car developed by Cadillac

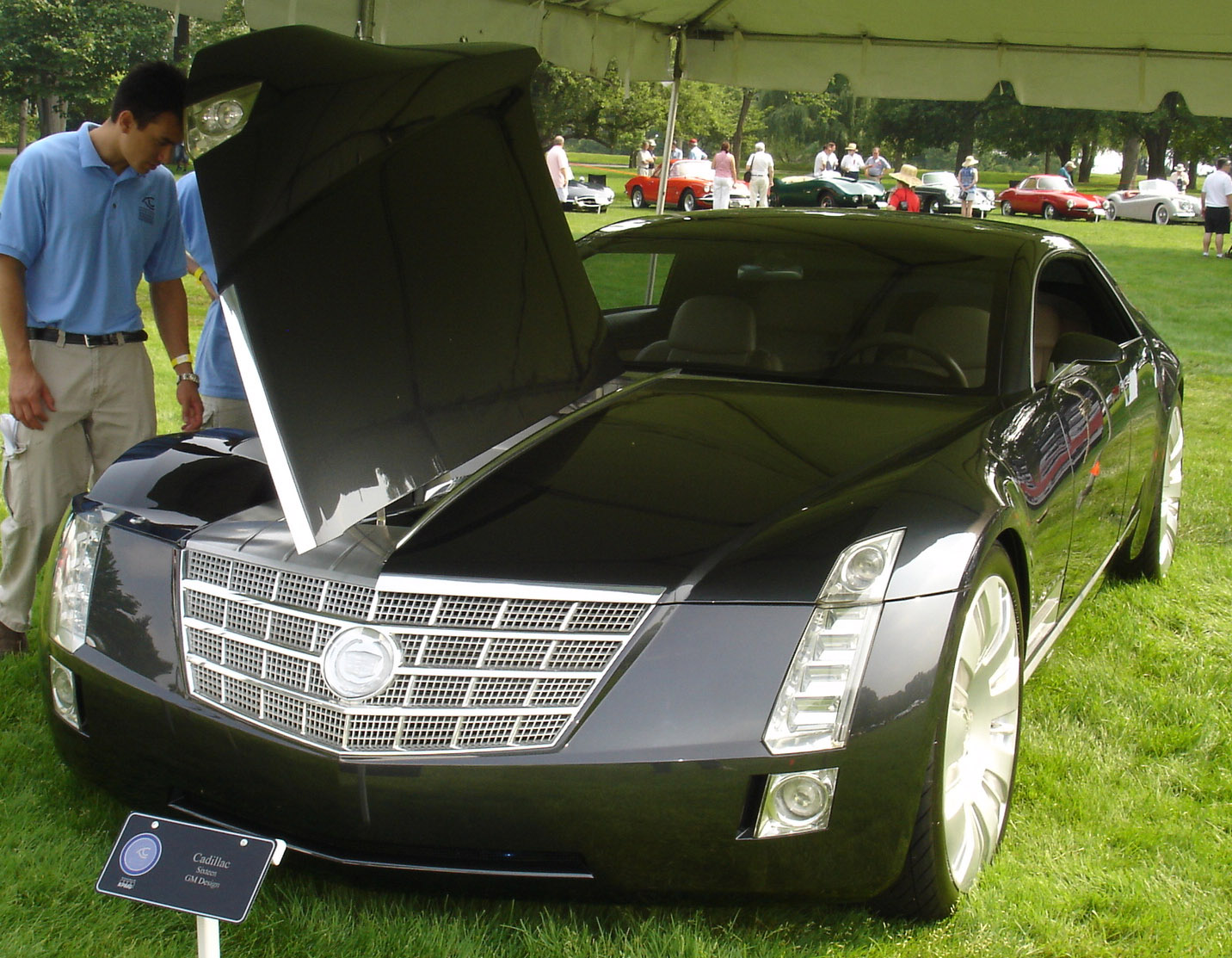

Overview
- Manufacturer: Cadillac (General Motors)
- Designer: Wayne Cherry, Brian Smith, Tom Stephens, Mike Torpey

Body and chassis
- Class: Concept car
- Body style: 4-door sedan
- Layout: Front-mid-engine, rear-wheel-drive

Powertrain
- Engine: 13.6 L (13,584 cc) 32-valve V16
- Transmission: 4 speed GM 4L85-E automatic (modified)

Dimensions
- Wheelbase: 3,556 mm (140.0 in)
- Length: 5,672 mm (223.3 in)
- Width: 2,029 mm (79.9 in)
- Height: 1,392 mm (54.8 in)
- Curb weight: 5,005 lb (2,270 kg)

The Cadillac Sixteen is a concept car first developed and presented by Cadillac in 2003.

The vehicle is equipped with a Cadillac proprietary-developed aluminum 32-valve V16 engine displacing 13.6 liters (829 cu. in; 13,584 cc), which was exclusive to the Sixteen and based on the GM Generation IV LS architecture. It is mated to a four-speed, electronically controlled, automatic transmission driving the rear wheels. The engine features fuel-saving Active Fuel Management "Displacement on Demand" technology, which could shut down either twelve or eight of the cylinders when the full output was not needed. The V16 was capable of 16.65 mpg under normal conditions. The engine was said to produce a minimum of 1,000 bhp (746 kW; 1,014 PS) and at least 1,000 lb⋅ft (1,356 N⋅m) of torque using no form of forced induction. The car itself weighs about 5,005 lb (2,270 kg).

The car referenced the Cadillac V-16 of the 1930s. The actual design of the car was a combination of Cadillac's current "Art and Science" design theme and 1967 Cadillac Eldorado cues. Additional original design elements were provided by an in-house design competition led by GM Vice President Bob Lutz. The Sixteen has the Cadillac logo carved out of solid crystal on the steering wheel and a Bulgari clock on the dashboard.

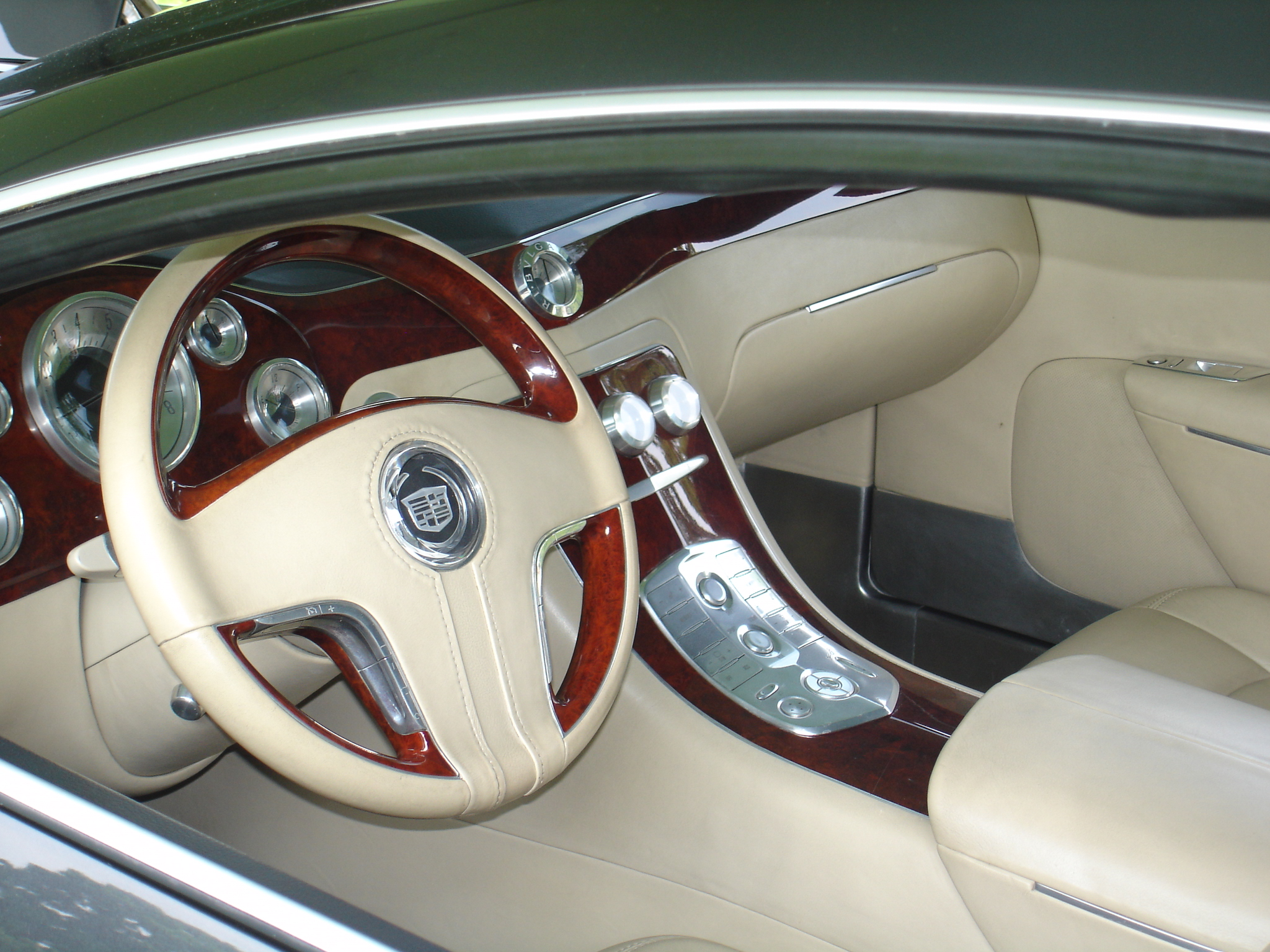
The Sixteen's interior

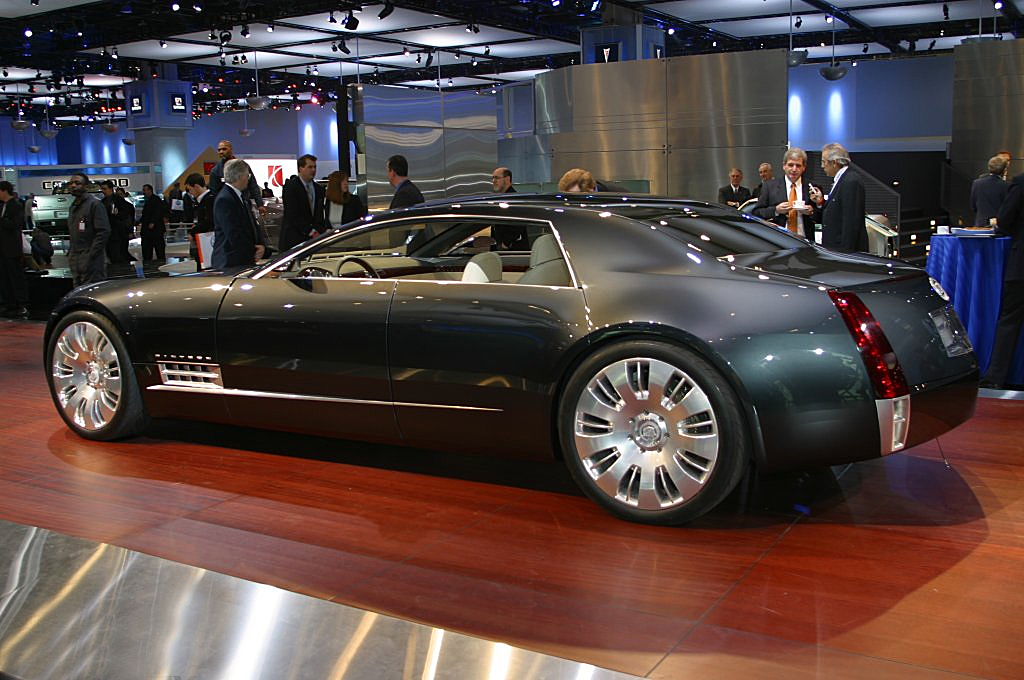
Rear view

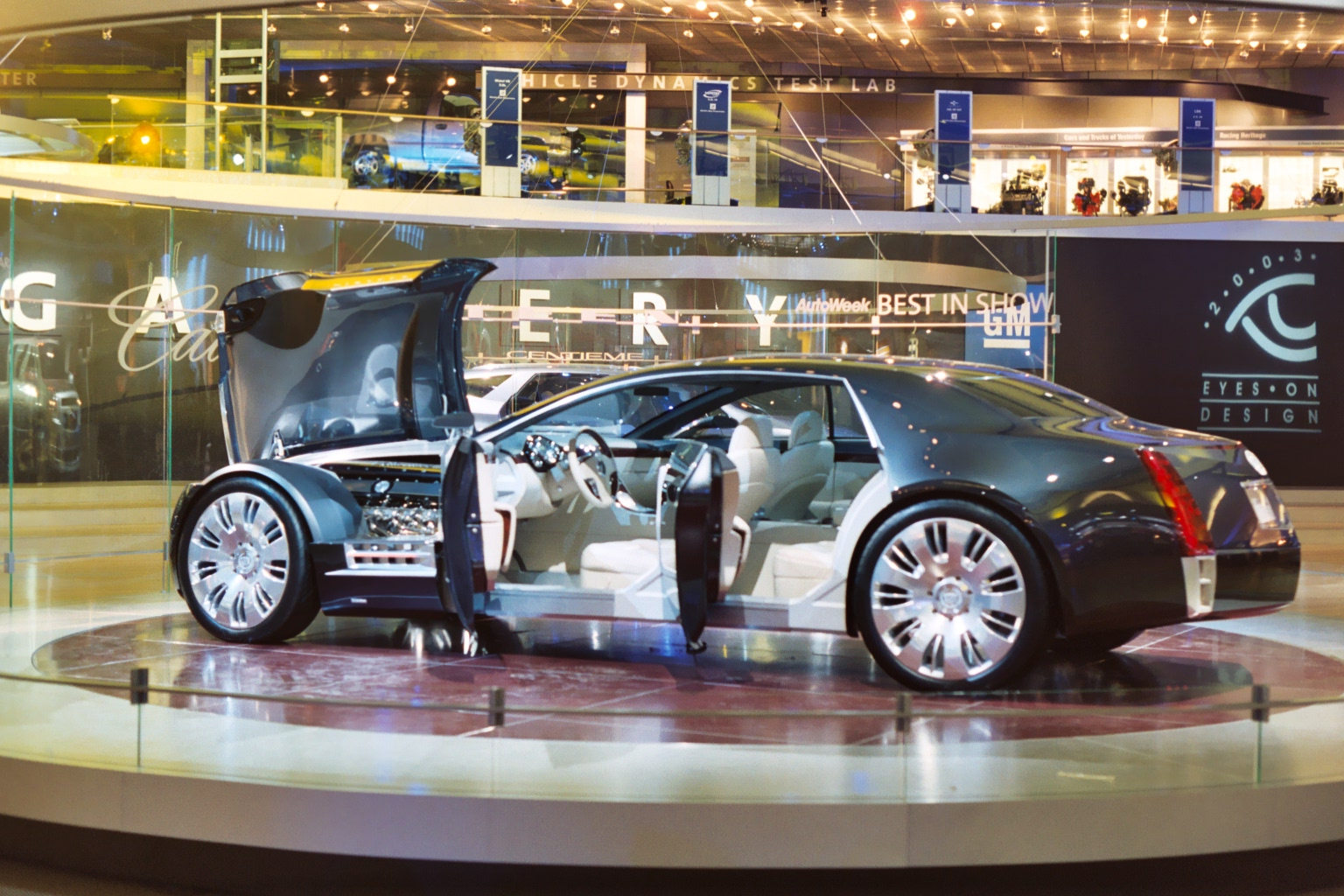
Side view with doors open

Although the Sixteen remained a concept car, its design language was implemented in Cadillac's subsequent vehicles, most noticeably on the 2008 Cadillac CTS. Since its unveiling there have been resurfacing rumors about a possible very limited production of an exclusive Cadillac halo model. A scaled-down version of the car, referred to as the ULS (Ultra Luxury Sedan) or XLS, with a standard V8 and an optional V12 (the latter was to be called the Cadillac Twelve), had been rumored for production since 2005, but was eventually shelved in favor of the Cadillac XTS.

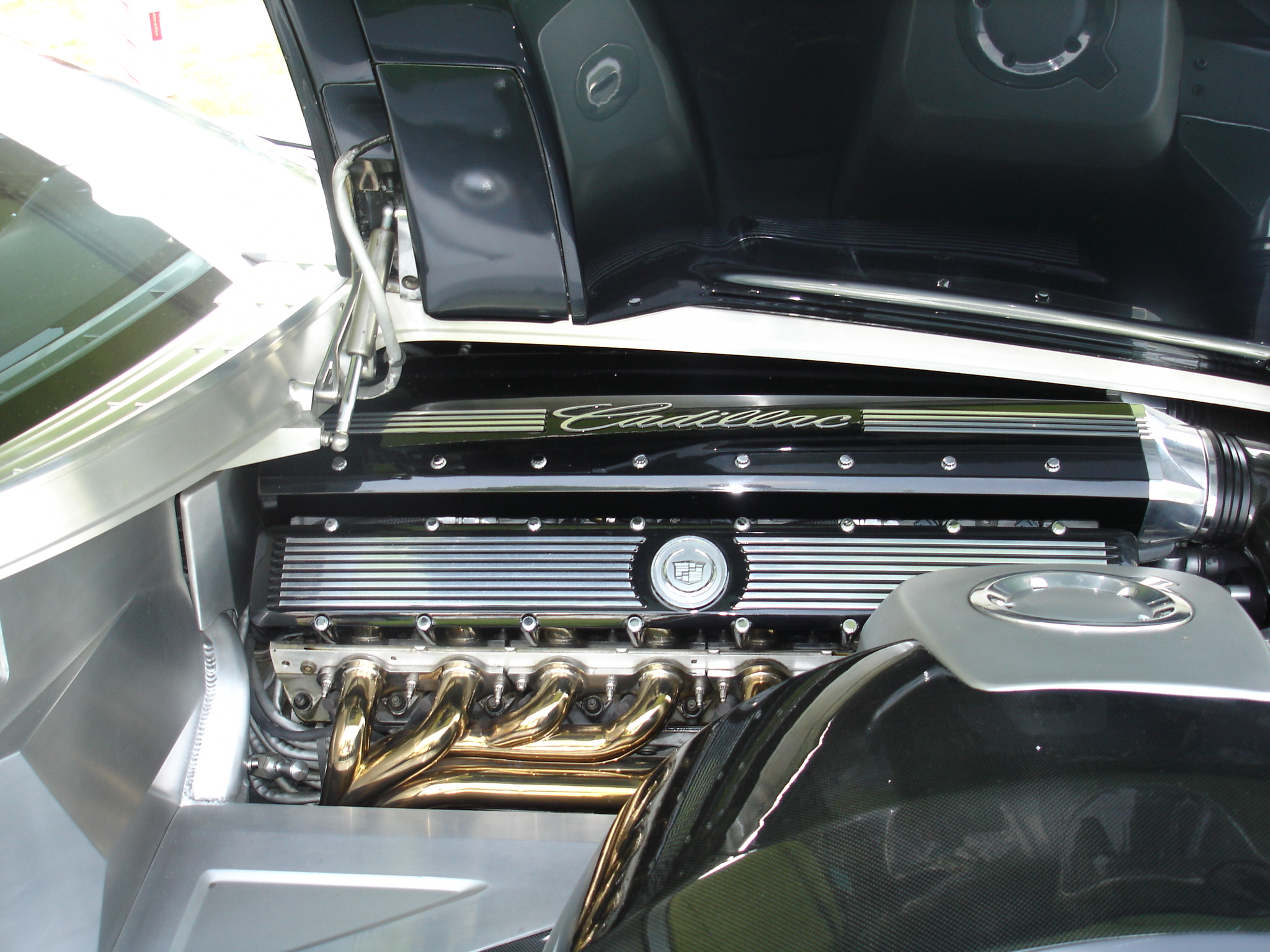
View of the V16 engine

Ever since the Sixteen was first unveiled there have been resurfacing rumors, speculation and high hopes of automotive journalists and aficionados about a possible limited production of an exclusive Cadillac halo model, such as the Sixteen, to be the "ultimate flagship" of the brand and sit atop of the upcoming flagship, as previewed by the Ciel concept of late 2011. An exclusive Cadillac halo model descended from the Sixteen concept lineage was finally confirmed in March 2020 with the Cadillac Celestiq, an ultra luxury, 4 door electric flagship sedan which began production in 2024.

== In media ==
In 2003, Top Gear reviewed the Cadillac 16 with its presenter James May in Series 2, Episode 10. May praised the Sixteen as "exactly what a Cadillac should be" and said it should be put into production.

In the 2006 film "Click" Adam Sandler can be seen driving the Cadillac 16 in the year 2017.

In the 2011 Film "Real Steel" James Rebhorn and Hope Davis can be seen driving off in the Cadillac 16.

It appears in the 2005 video game "Midnight Club 3" where it is a B-class luxury sedan and in the 2007 video game "Project Gotham Racing 4", where it is an E-class vehicle.
