= Top Gear series 1 =

Top Gear
- Series 1
- Starring: Jeremy Clarkson; Jason Dawe; Richard Hammond; The Stig
- No. of episodes: 10

Release
- Original network: BBC Two
- Original release: 20 October – 29 December 2002

Series chronology
- Next → Series 2

Series 1 of Top Gear, a British motoring magazine and factual television programme, was broadcast in the United Kingdom on BBC Two during 2002, consisting of ten episodes that were aired between 20 October and 29 December. This series featured Jeremy Clarkson and Richard Hammond as the co-hosts of the programme, a role they would both maintain until the end of the twenty-second series, but the only series to feature Jason Dawe as their co-presenter before he was replaced by James May for the second series.

The series introduced much of the new elements that the programme had brought in as part of its relaunch of original 1977 programme of the same name, including the anonymous driver known as "The Stig" (portrayed by Perry McCarthy), the Top Gear test track, and the celebrity timed laps that would begin with the Suzuki Liana. The series' most notable elements included a group of "grannies" doing specialized stunts, several religious leaders racing against each other, and the presenters making their own "James Bond" gadget car.

== Production ==
Following the cancellation of the original format of Top Gear in December 2001, previous format presenters Jeremy Clarkson and Andy Wilman convinced the BBC to revive the show with a new format for the following year. These new changes included the use of television studio segments and challenges, and a revamped presentation of reviews, unlike the previous show which focused on the production of cars. Clarkson later announced that he would present the new show, with Wilman serving as the executive producer, whilst motoring journalists Richard Hammond and Jason Dawe joined as new presenters, both of whom had not hosted the previous format.

== Episodes ==
No. overall	No. in series	Reviews	Features/challenges	Guest(s)	Original release date	UK viewers (millions)
1	1	Citroën Berlingo Multispace • Pagani Zonda S • Lamborghini Murciélago • Mazda6	Ford GT40 concept • Beating a speed camera • Running a car on vegetable oil	Harry Enfield	20 October 2002	2.43
In the first episode of the relaunched Top Gear, Jeremy Clarkson reviews the Citroën Berlingo Multispace, the Pagani Zonda S, and the Lamborghini Murciélago, and tests out how a car could be run on vegetable oil. Richard Hammond reviews the Mazda6, and tests an urban myth concerning speed cameras. Finally, the programme unveils its specially crafted Top Gear test track, with lap times being made in the Zonda and Murciélago by anonymous racing driver The Stig, alongside celebrity guest Harry Enfield in a Suzuki Liana for the first run of "Star in a Reasonably Priced Car".
2	2	Ford Focus RS • Noble M12 GTO • Ford Escort RS1800	Bus jumping over bikes	Jay Kay	27 October 2002	3.54
Clarkson tries out the Ford Focus RS on the road and the Noble M12 GTO at the Track. Hammond attempts to see how many motorcycles a double-decker bus can jump over, and looks back at his childhood dream car – the 1977 Ford Escort RS1800. Meanwhile, Jay Kay is the next star to drive the Liana around the Top Gear Test Track.
3	3	Mini One • Toyota Yaris Verso • Citroën DS • Aston Martin DB7 • Westfield XTR2	How car designers Peter Horbury and Ian Callum style cars • Grannies doing donuts with a Honda S2000	Ross Kemp	3 November 2002	3.30
Clarkson takes a look at the new Mini and the Toyota Yaris Verso, before testing out the Aston Martin DB7 Vantage. Hammond sees if grannies can do donuts in a Honda S2000 and reviews the Westfield XTR2. Car designers Peter Horbury and Ian Callum discuss how cars are designed, while Ross Kemp attempts to get the Liana around a wet Top Gear Test Track.
4	4	Aston Martin Vanquish • Ferrari 575M Maranello • Family saloons: (Ford Mondeo • Toyota Avensis • Jaguar X-Type • Mercedes-Benz C-Class • BMW 3 Series • Honda Accord)	Interview with Richard Burns • Nissan Skyline R34 GT-R used car buying guide • James Bond cars for the movie Die Another Day	Steve Coogan	10 November 2002	2.90
Clarkson compares the Aston Martin Vanquish against the Ferrari 575M Maranello, and takes a look at the cars specially designed for Die Another Day. Hammond judges mid-range family saloons in a Formula One-styled race, whilst Dawe reviews the Nissan Skyline GT-R and compares its against previous Skyline generations – the R32, the R33, and the R34. Meanwhile, Steve Coogan sees how he handles the Liana around a wet track.
5	5	Mercedes-Benz S-Class • Audi A8 • Maybach 62 • Bentley Arnage T	Jaguar XJ concept • Peugeot 206 used car buying guide • Budget James Bond car	Jonathan Ross	17 November 2002	3.43
Clarkson takes a look at three luxurious cars - the Mercedes-Benz S-Class, the Audi A8, and the Bentley Arnage T. Dawe drives some used Peugeot 206s to determine which is worth value for money. Hammond gushes over the new Maybach 62, before revealing the trio's very own 007/Bond car with gadgets suggested by viewers. Meanwhile Jonathan Ross finds himself struggling in the Liana with an extremely wet test track.
6	6	Renault Vel Satis • BMW Z4 • Mercedes-Benz SL55 AMG	Honda NSX power lap • Grannies handbrake-parking a Mini • VW Golf used car buying guide	Tara Palmer-Tomkinson	24 November 2002	3.10
Clarkson reviews the Renault Vel Satis and the Mercedes-Benz SL55 AMG, the latter he recently bought, and introduces Top Gear's new segment - the Cool Wall. Dawe sees if the same grannies from before can do a handbrake park, and looks back at a used car that never went out of fashion – the Volkswagen Golf. Meanwhile Tara Palmer-Tomkinson looks back to how well she did in the Liana.
7	7	Saab 9-3 • Lotus Elise 111S	M4 bus lane investigation • Religion race I • Environmentally-friendly cars (Peugeot RC • Toyota Prius • Ford TH!NK) • Children's favourite supercars	Rick Parfitt	1 December 2002	3.61
Hammond drives a Saab 9-3 to see if it is wacky and interesting like old Saabs, and Clarkson puts the Lotus Elise 111S through its paces. Elsewhere, Dawe visits a primary school to see which car the kids there think is coolest, while there's a race to see which religious faith is the fastest. Finally, Rick Parfitt of Status Quo sees if he can get the Liana quickly around the test track.
8	8	Audi RS6 • Mercedes-Benz E55 AMG • Superminis: (Ford Fiesta • Citroën C3 • Honda Jazz • Nissan Micra • MG ZR) • Maserati Coupé	Tuning a Lada Riva • White van man race	Sir Michael Gambon	8 December 2002	3.43
Clarkson road tests the Audi RS6 the Mercedes-Benz E55 AMG, and the Maserati Coupé, while Hammond reviews a group of "superminis" – the Ford Fiesta, the Citroën C3, the Honda Jazz, the Nissan Micra, and the MG ZR. Lotus attempts to improve a Lada Riva 1.5E Catalyst, while a group of White-Van men race around the track in a Ford World Rally Transit van. Finally, Michael Gambon has an unexpected lap in the Liana. Note: This episode saw the last corner of the track, Carpenter's Corner, being renamed as "Gambon Corner", in honor of Michael Gambon's near-accident during his time in the Liana.
9	9	Cars for the school run: (Renault Espace • Toyota Land Cruiser • Volvo XC90) • Subaru Forester • Volkswagen Golf R32	MG XPower SV concept • Stripping down a Jaguar XJ-S • Radical SR3 vs an aerobatic plane	Gordon Ramsay	22 December 2002	3.67
Clarkson tests out the Renault Espace, the Toyota Land Cruiser, the Volvo XC90 Estate, and the Volkswagen Golf R32 are to drive. Elsewhere, Hammond reviews the Subaru Forester, a crew from Cornwall can make a used 1985 Jaguar XJ-S V12 faster, and the Stig races a Radical SR3 against an aerobatic plane. Finally, Gordon Ramsay is in the Liana to produce something hotter than just food.
10	10	Offroaders in the countryside: (Toyota Land Cruiser Amazon • BMW X5 • Jeep Grand Cherokee • Range Rover) • Lotus Esprit V8 • TVR T350C	Top Gear Awards 2002 • Tuned German cars: (AS One • Audi TT MTM Bimoto) • Cheap used cars (Nissan Primera • Nissan 300C • Vauxhall Astra CDi) • Religion race II	None	29 December 2002	3.59
Clarkson has differing views on the new Range Rover and the Lotus Esprit V8. Hammond drives the TVR T350C Concept, and Dawe looks into the Nissan Primera. There's a further race to find the fastest faith in the world with some additional religions, while the trio find out what cars have gotten what awards in the Top Gear Awards 2002. Note: Last appearance of Jason Dawe as a presenter on Top Gear

== Best-of episodes ==
No.	Feature	Original air date
1	Best Moments from Series 1 (Part 1)	26 January 2003
A compilation of the best moments from Series 1, including reviews of the Noble M12, BMW Z4, Mercedes-Benz SL55 AMG, interviews with celebrity guests Harry Enfield, Tara Palmer-Tomkinson, Jonathan Ross, and a compilation of power laps by The Stig.
2	Best Moments from Series 1 (Part 2)	30 March 2003
More of the best moments from Series 1, including the review of the Ford RS Focus, a comparison between the Lamborghini Murciélago and the Pagani Zonda, plus interviews with Gordon Ramsay and Michael Gambon.
3	Best Moments from Series 1 (Part 3)	6 April 2003
Even more of the best moments from Series 1, including the comparison between the Aston Martin Vanquish and the Ferrari 575 on the Isle of Man, tests of the Bentley Arnage and the Lotus Elise on the track, and interviews with Steve Coogan and Jay Kay.
