= Carver (automotive company) =

Dutch vehicle company

Carver Europe B.V.
- Formerly: Brink Technologies Group B.V., Brink Dynamics, Carver Engineering
- Type: Private
- Industry: Electric vehicles
- Founded: 1994; 32 years ago
- Founders: Chris van den Brink
- Headquarters: Leeuwarden, Netherlands
- Key people: Anton Rosier (CEO); Chris van den Brink (CTO); Harry Kroonen (Engineer)
- Products: Tilting three-wheelers
- Website: https://web.archive.org/web/20240727073253/https://carver.earth/

Carver Europe B.V. was a Dutch company that developed and manufactured three-wheeled electric enclosed man-wide vehicles. The company's core technology was the Dynamic Vehicle Control (DVC) system, which enables narrow vehicles to make banked turns, aiding stability when turning at high speeds.

Its headquarters, assembly factory, experience center, and sales and marketing activities, were in Leeuwarden. The engineering team was located in 's-Gravendeel and operated under the name Carver Technology B.V.

The company was founded in 1994 by Chris van den Brink and Harry Kroonen as Brink Technologies Group B.V., although its history can be traced further back to 1990. Since then, the company has seen several changes to its name and structure. The current CEO is Anton Rosier and Chris van den Brink operates as CTO (Chief Technology Officer).

By 2019, Carver produced two distinct vehicle models: the Carver One - a high-speed model with a petrol engine - and a fully electric scooter model called the Carver. The latter was launched in late 2019.

In July 2024 Carver went bankrupt and as a result its website was taken offline.

In 2024, LYNX ApS acquired the rights to produce the Carver, including patents and IP following the Dutch company’s bankruptcy. With co-ownership in the Belgian firm KERV Automotive, they announced the intention to continue the Carver legacy.

== History ==
In 1990 Ton van den Brink, founder and director of Eurotool Operation B.V., questioned the necessity of using a conventional family car for everyday transportation after experiencing traffic congestion in Paris. He founded Eco-Car B.V. to investigate the feasibility of developing a 'slender comfort vehicle', also known as a tilting three-wheeler or man-wide vehicle, having half the width and weight of a conventional car. Research conducted by the firm showed that 90% of cars were occupied by one or two persons, indicating considerable market potential for such vehicles. In the following years, a team of engineers led by Ton's son Chris van den Brink, and by Harry Kroonen, worked on a concept car. Their biggest engineering challenge was preventing a man-wide vehicle from tipping over when cornering. In 1993 they presented their first concept car at 'The Compact Car, History with a Future' exhibition, a narrow three-wheeled car with side wheels for stability. This car was not viable so in 1994 they develop the Dynamic Vehicle Control (DVC) system, which was internationally patented in 1995.

In September 1994, Brink Technologies Group B.V. was founded and the first prototype of the Carver One was built that same year. Engineering activities related to the DVC technology took place under the name Brink Dynamics. Three years later in May 1997, the vehicle was approved for road use by the RDW (Netherlands Vehicle Authority). In June, Carver's DVC technology was awarded 'Invention of the Year' by the Dutch Innovation Group. In 1999, Carver participates at the IAA Frankfurt Motor Show.

In 2003, Carver launched 24 limited-edition vehicles, the Vandenbrink Carver. The vehicle received considerable positive media attention e.g. from BBC's Top Gear. The Vandenbrink model was further optimized into the Carver One.

The first Carver Ones were delivered in 2007. Two years later, in early 2009, Toyota halted all sales of Daihatsu engines to third parties, including the 660cc engine that powered the Carver One. Consequently, the production of the Carver One had to be halted. In June 2009 Carver Europe declared bankruptcy due to lack of demand at its 30,000 euro price, and ceased commercial production and sales. The company Carver Technology and the patents were excluded from the bankruptcy and remain in the hands of the original owners. Approximately 200 Carver Ones were produced.

In 2010, Carver continued its activities as Carver Technology, with a focus on licensing its patents. In the following years, the DVC technology is being further optimized and offered as a license to other companies such as the PAL-V flying car company, Venture Vehicles/Persu, and Lynx.

In March 2015, a licensing agreement was made with Chinese scooter manufacturer Sunra to use Carver's DVC technology in an electric, enclosed two-person vehicle, but work on the project did not begin. In the fall, Carver began developing its own electric vehicle. The company slowly discontinued its licensing agreements with other companies.

The first prototype of the electric Carver was built, tested and optimized in 2017. That same year, Carver started to develop for high volume production and took industry investors on board as minority stakeholders, among which were Velosophy the Dutch Accell group, owners of brands like Batavus and Sparta.

In April 2018, Carver opened its doors for pre-orders. Initial plans were to launch the vehicle by fall that year, but this was postponed to early 2019. In December, Carver announced that it would open its own assembly factory in Leeuwarden, Netherlands. Consequently, its headquarters also moved to Leeuwarden. The engineering team remained in 's Gravendeel.

== Dynamic Vehicle Control system ==
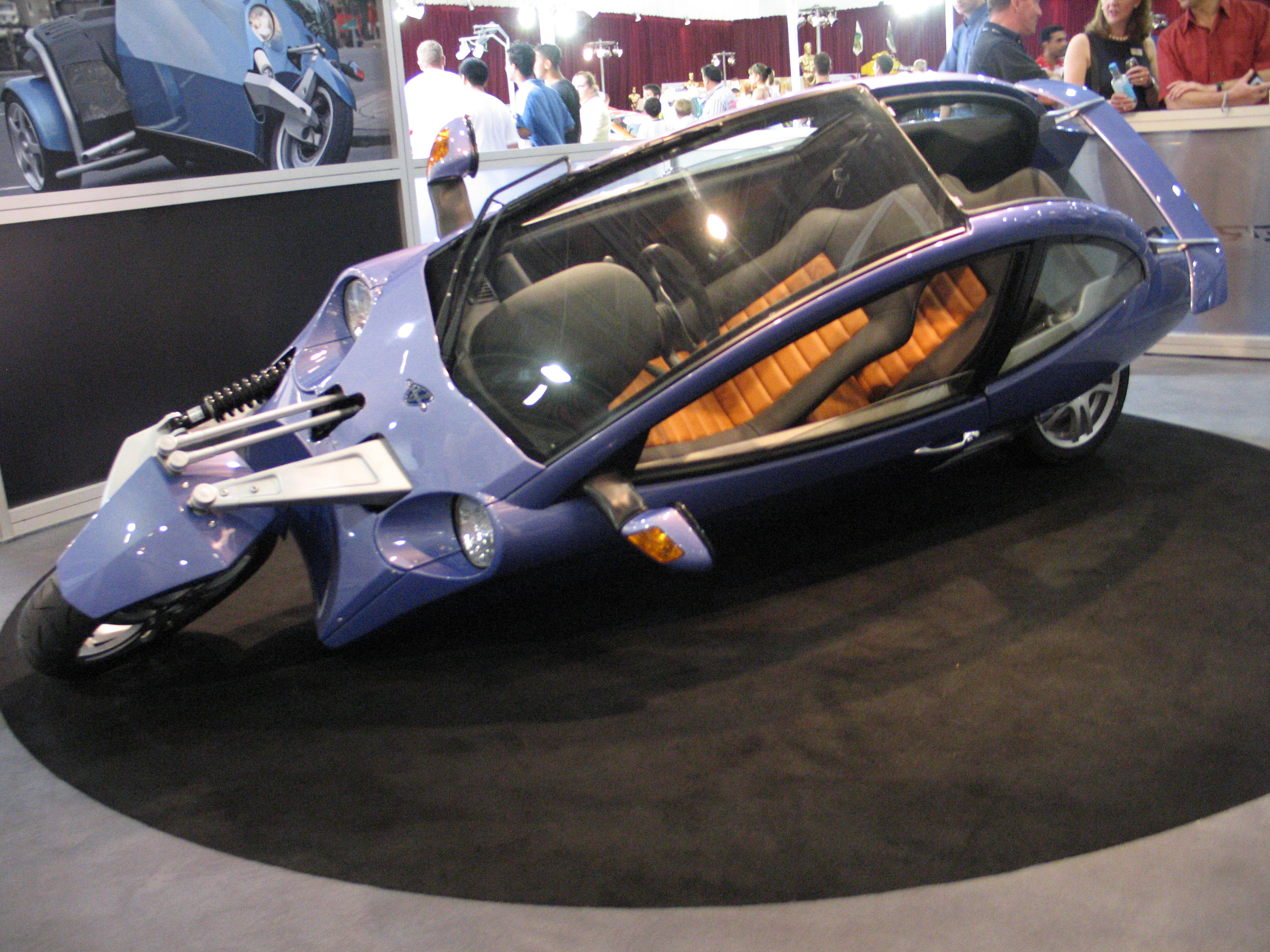
Carver One from the side

The unique property of the Carver vehicles is its automatic balancing "Dynamic Vehicle Control" system. The DVC technology was invented to allow for full stability when turning at high speeds in an enclosed narrow vehicle.

When turning, any object is subject to a certain amount of centrifugal force, directed away from the center around which the object is moving. As speed increases, the amount of force applied to the object also increases. As a result, standard narrow vehicles with a narrow wheel base, can only take turns up to relatively low speeds before tipping over, compared to a conventional car. For this reason, conventional cars have a relatively wide wheelbase. A wide wheelbase however, also leads to a high frontal area leading to high drag.

The stability issue of narrow vehicles is solved when it is able to take a banked turn. By banking, the centrifugal force is compensated by the inward lean. This behavior can be observed in motorcyclists when taking turns. Also in nature, high-speed animals bank into the curve they are taking.

On a motorcycle, the rider has to work in three modes of operation, i.e. a high-speed, low-speed and stand-still mode. At high speed, the rider keeps balance merely by controlling the steering wheel and making use of the stabilizing gyroscopic effect of the wheels. At low speed and stand still, balance is controlled by using his body and his feet. In an enclosed vehicle, however, the driver does not have the possibility to balance or put a foot on the ground and therefore a mechanism is required that allows the vehicle to stand up at low speeds while also allowing the vehicle's bodywork to tilt when taking turns at higher speeds.

With the DVC system, the car's bodywork moves independently from the rear wheels and engine. The DVC system automatically adjusts the tilt angle of the vehicle to the speed and acceleration of the vehicle in such a way that it always is in balance. It was designed as a proactive instead of a reactive system, meaning a Carver tilts before cornering, much like when an airplane tilts to one side in order to turn in that direction.

In 2007 it was announced that a California company called Venture Vehicles would be producing the VentureOne, a vehicle using Carver's DVC system. The VentureOne was to be produced in three models: the e50 hybrid, the Q100 high-performance hybrid, and the EV all electric. In December 2008 Venture Vehicles was renamed Persu Mobility. Persu Mobility continued to hold an exclusive license in North America to produce vehicles using the DVC system and began pre-registration for a vehicle with an internal combustion engine called the Persu V3, to be available in 2014. Persu has also planned future production of a plug-in hybrid. The DVC system also is licensed to PAL-V who are developing a full-fledged flying and driving vehicle. The DVC system has been demonstrated on a self-balancing ATV.

== The Carver ==
The Carver is a fully electric vehicle,(EV) featuring aspects of both a scooter and a car. In terms of legislation, the Carver is categorized as a scooter, which means that a scooter driving license is sufficient to drive it. Yet a Carver is operated much like a car i.e. in an enclosed compartment (with removable windows), a steering wheel and foot pedals.

Like the Carver One, the electric Carver has three wheels; one in the front and two in the back, and is equipped with the Dynamic Vehicle Control system to ensure stability when turning. The Carver base model (R) is 2.89 m in length, 0.98 m in width, 1.49 m in height and weighs 260 kg. The S+ model is slightly wider 1.06 m and slightly heavier. Inside there is space for two occupants (a driver and passenger) plus an additional 75 liters of luggage in the back.

The Carver base (R) top speed is 45 km/h, which it can reach within 8 seconds. It range maxes out at 130 km. The Carver S+ top speed is 80 km/h and max range of 100 km. Being a fully electric vehicle, the Carver carries a 5.4 kWh lithium iron phosphate battery. An hour charging will take you approx 20 km and it takes approximately 4.2 and 5.2 hours to recharge the battery to 80% and 100% respectively.

Component production and pre-assembly takes place in China, Taiwan and South Korea. All high-tech components are designed, developed and produced in Europe. The final stages of assembly and vehicle calibration take place in Carver's assembly factory in Leeuwarden, Netherlands.

== Carver One ==
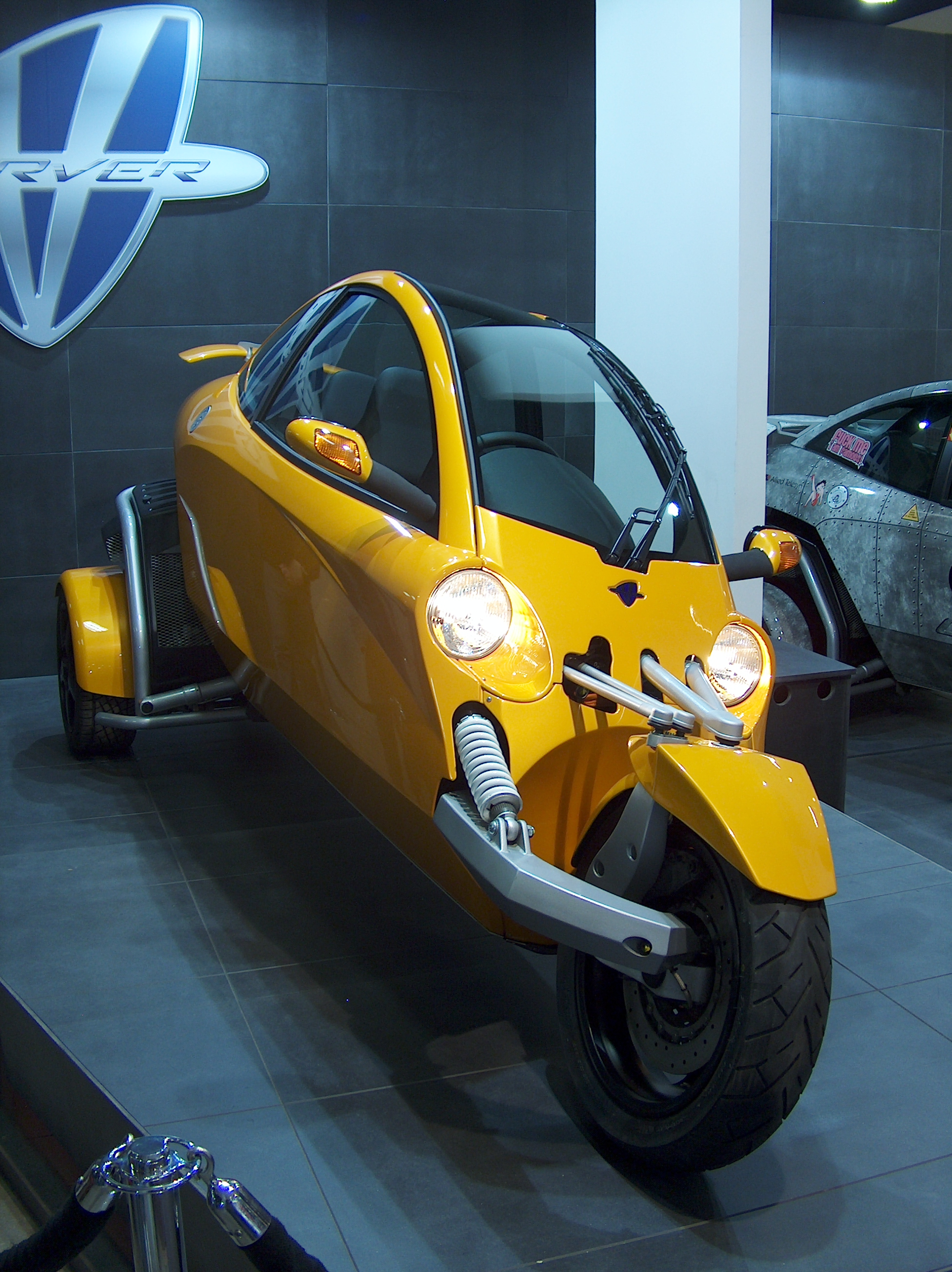
Carver One from the front

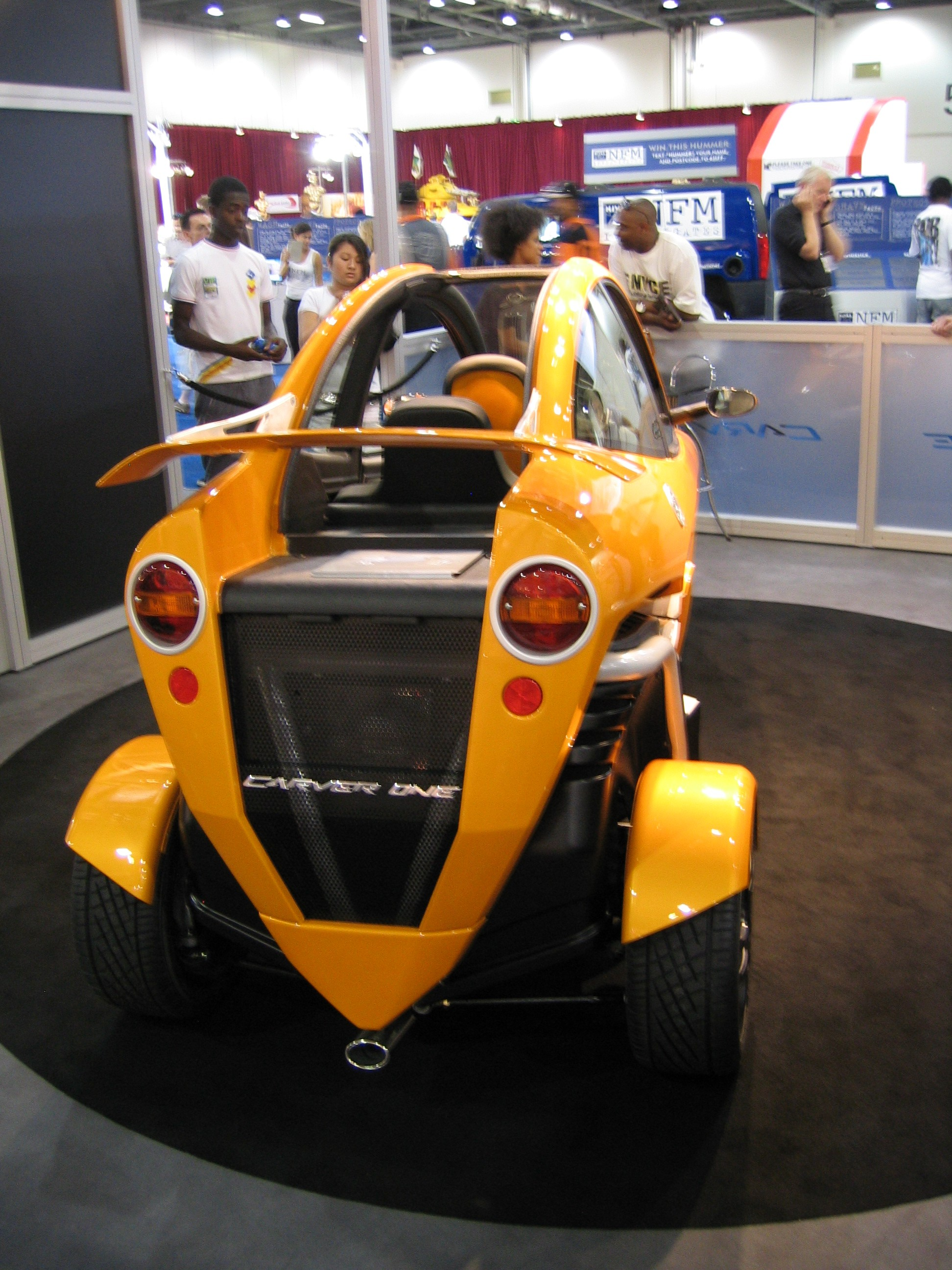
Carver One from the rear

=== Design and specification ===
The Carver vehicle combines aspects of a motorcycle and a car, both in appearance and design. Like many microcars, the Carver has three wheels and the controls of a normal car. The three-wheel Carver One is said to have the comfort, controls and stability of a normal car while showing the dynamic cornering behaviour of a motorcycle. The Carver was design with man-wide vehicles (MWVs in mind.) The Carver can be driven by anyone with a normal car driver's license in the European Union, though other countries outside of the EU may not allow this. In most countries it is licensed as a motorcycle.

The dimensions are 3,400 mm (130 in) long by 1,300 mm (51 in) wide by 1,400 mm (55 in) high, giving it a low slim profile, similar to a motorcycle. It weighs 643 kg (1,418 lb), about half the weight of a medium size car or three to four times the weight of most motorcycles. The Carver One can tilt up to 45° while turning. This is not based on how far the steering wheel is rotated, but on how much cornering force is applied to it.

The Carver has a four-stroke 660 cc (40 cu in) 16-valve inline-four engine with an intercooled turbocharger, giving a power output of 65 bhp (48 kW) at 6,000 rpm and a maximum torque of 100 N⋅m (74 lbf⋅ft) at 3,200 rpm. The transmission is a 5-speed manual with reverse, and all wheels are equipped with ventilated disk brakes. The front wheel is slightly larger than the rear wheels (at 17" to 15").

The Carver One, as standard, has a top speed of 185 km/h (115 mph). It accelerates from 0–100 km/h (0–62 mph) in 8.2 seconds or 0 to 60 mph in 8 seconds.

The Carver One was produced in collaboration with Prodrive in the UK. The Carver One was assembled in Germany by ACÜ, part of the Mosolf Group, and officially launched at the Geneva Motor Show on 7 March 2007.

=== Reception ===
The Carver One has been reviewed by various celebrities in various shows.

In 2002, journalists Karl Tsigdinos and Conor Feehan got the chance to pilot the original Carver One on the ITV motoring program Drive!.

On BBC's Top Gear programme in 2002, Jeremy Clarkson said, "I have to say, absolute hand on heart, I've never had so much fun in a car, really and truthfully, and I don't think I'd ever tire of it." Shortly thereafter the Carver One also featured in a special video of Jeremy Clarkson called "Shoot-out." He announced the vehicle to be "the most fun you can have."

Jenson Button tested the Carver One in 2004, and said "this car or bike or whatever you want to call it, is possibly the weirdest thing I have driven". The Carvers have also appeared in Sky Three "The Race" equipped with paint ball guns and driven by celebrities, and also Channel Fives "Gadget Show". Most recently the Carver One appeared in the intro, but not the main program, of Amazon Prime's Grand Tour Season One Episode 5 Moroccan Roll.

== Flying car ==
The PAL-V (Personal Air and Land Vehicle) is an autogyro developed from the Carver. It made its first flight in April 2012.

== Version and variants ==
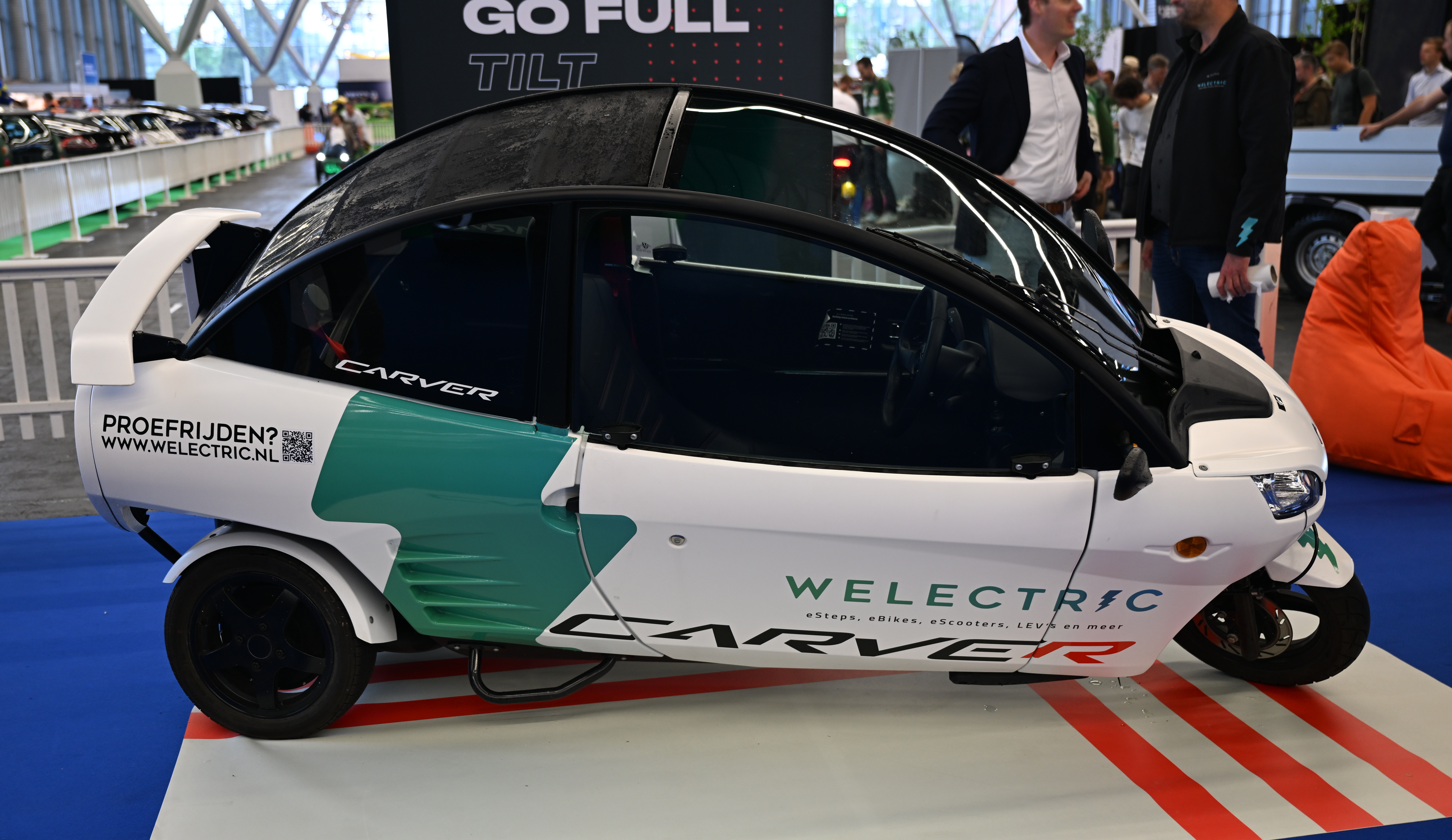
Carver on display at Fully Charged in 2022

=== Carver models ===
- Bug Carver (from 1999) – A carver with wing mirror at the top of the doors
- van den Brink Carver – Approx. 24 hand-made Carver One's
- Carver One – Approx 200 produced and sold around the world
- Carver - electric scooter model

=== Variants ===
- Venture Vehicles/Persu Mobility – US
- PAL-V
- Phiaro p67b eternity – Japanese Styled
- Lynx Lean Electric – Denmark
- Helix Motors
- Chinese Sunra
- Kerv Automotive – Belgian

== See also ==
- CLEVER – a similar BMW concept car
