= RDW (organization) =

Dutch vehicle authority

RDW (Dienst Wegverkeer)

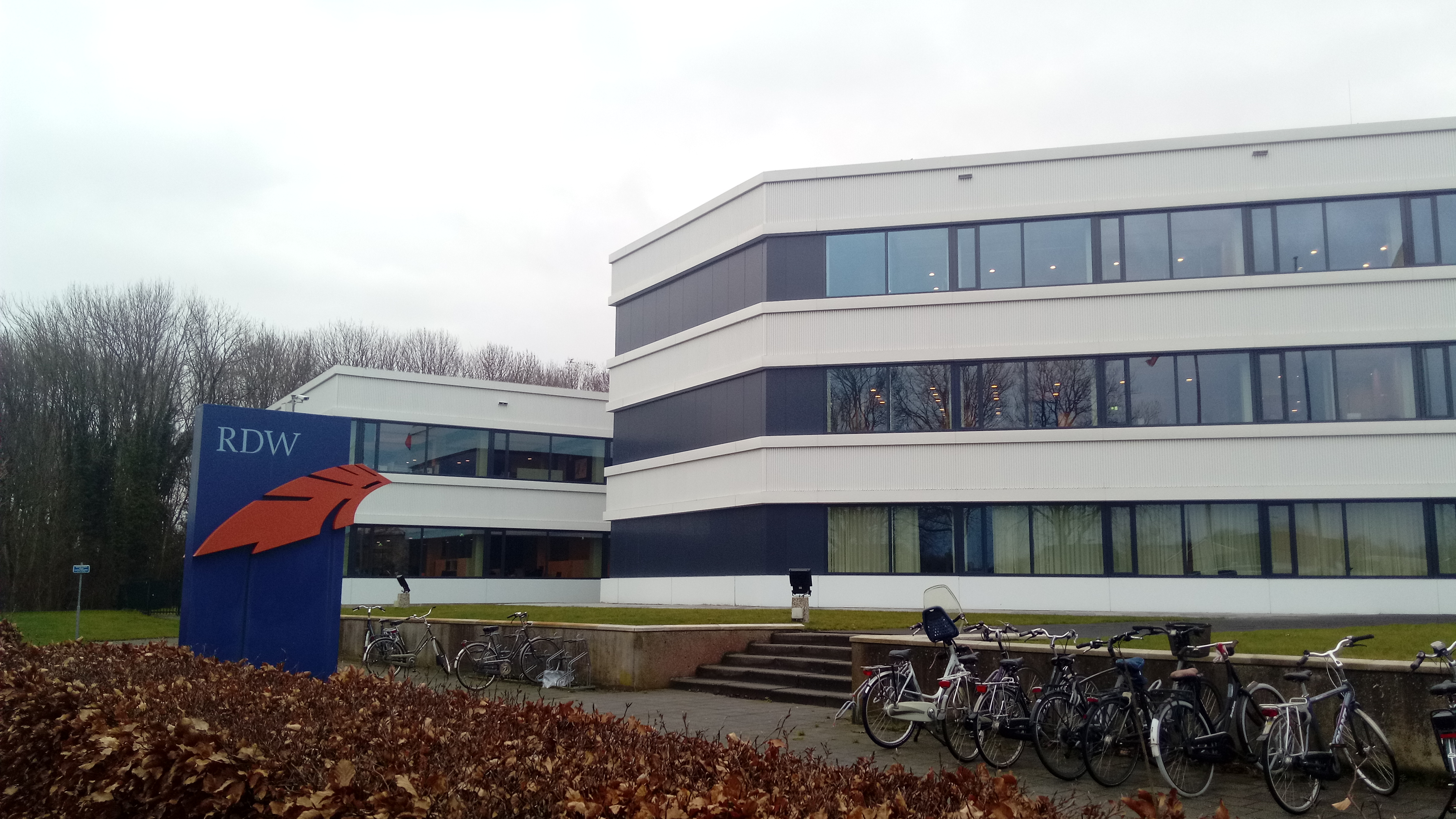
- Formation: September 1, 1949; 77 years ago
- Headquarters: Zoetermeer
- Services: Licensing, approval, supervision and information providing regarding vehicles
- Website: rdw.nl

Dienst Wegverkeer, commonly known as RDW, (Note: Originally named "Rijksdienst voor het Wegverkeer", Dutch law references to the organisation as "Dienst Wegverkeer", while defining that the public name is written and pronounced as "RDW".) is the organization that handles the type-approval and registration of motorized vehicles and driving licences in the Netherlands. This is not limited to passenger cars, but also includes trucks, tractors, bicycles, scooters, drones and more. The RDW is an independent administrative body of the Dutch government. Up until 1996, the organisation was known as "Rijksdienst voor het Wegverkeer".

The official English name of RDW is: the Netherlands Vehicle Authority.

== History ==
The RDW was established on 1 September 1949 as the Rijksdienst voor het Wegverkeer (National Service for Road Traffic), through the merger of the Technical Service of the Rijksverkeersinspectie and the Bureau Inschrijvingen Motorrijtuigen en Aanhangwagens of Rijkswaterstaat.

In 1951, responsibility for vehicle registration (including the issuance of license plates and registration certificates) was fully centralized under the RDW.

During the 1960s and 1970s, the agency expanded its services to include the systematic issuance of driving licences and the implementation of safety inspections; in 1974, a portion of its operations was transferred to a newly opened office in Veendam to promote regional decentralization of government services.

The introduction of the APK (Algemene Periodieke Keuring), the Netherlands' mandatory periodic motor‑vehicle inspection, was legislated in 1985; the RDW was charged with certifying and supervising all inspection garages.

In the early 1990s, the RDW began digitizing its vehicle‑registration database and launched its first online services for both citizens and commercial partners, marking the start of its transition toward e‑government operations.

On 1 January 1996, under the Dutch Public Bodies Act (Wet zelfstandige bestuursorganen), the RDW became an independent administrative authority (zelfstandig bestuursorgaan, ZBO), granting it greater operational autonomy while remaining under ministerial oversight.

In 2004, the RDW was designated by the European Commission as a notified body for motor‑vehicle type approval, enabling vehicles approved by RDW to be marketed EU‑wide without further national testing.

In 2014, the traditional paper registration document was replaced with the secure, chip‑embedded "Kentekencard" to prevent forgery and streamline enforcement checks.

Since 2019, RDW has organised the annual Self Driving Challenge, inviting student teams from Dutch universities to develop autonomous‑kart software and race on real circuits, reflecting RDW's engagement with emerging vehicle technologies.

== Statutory tasks ==
The RDW is responsible for four different subjects in the Netherlands:

=== Type-approval and licensing ===
The RDW is authorized for conducting Motor vehicle type approvals for the entire European Union, and is often chosen by foreign car manufacturers and brand due to a lack of competition from Dutch automobile manufacturers.

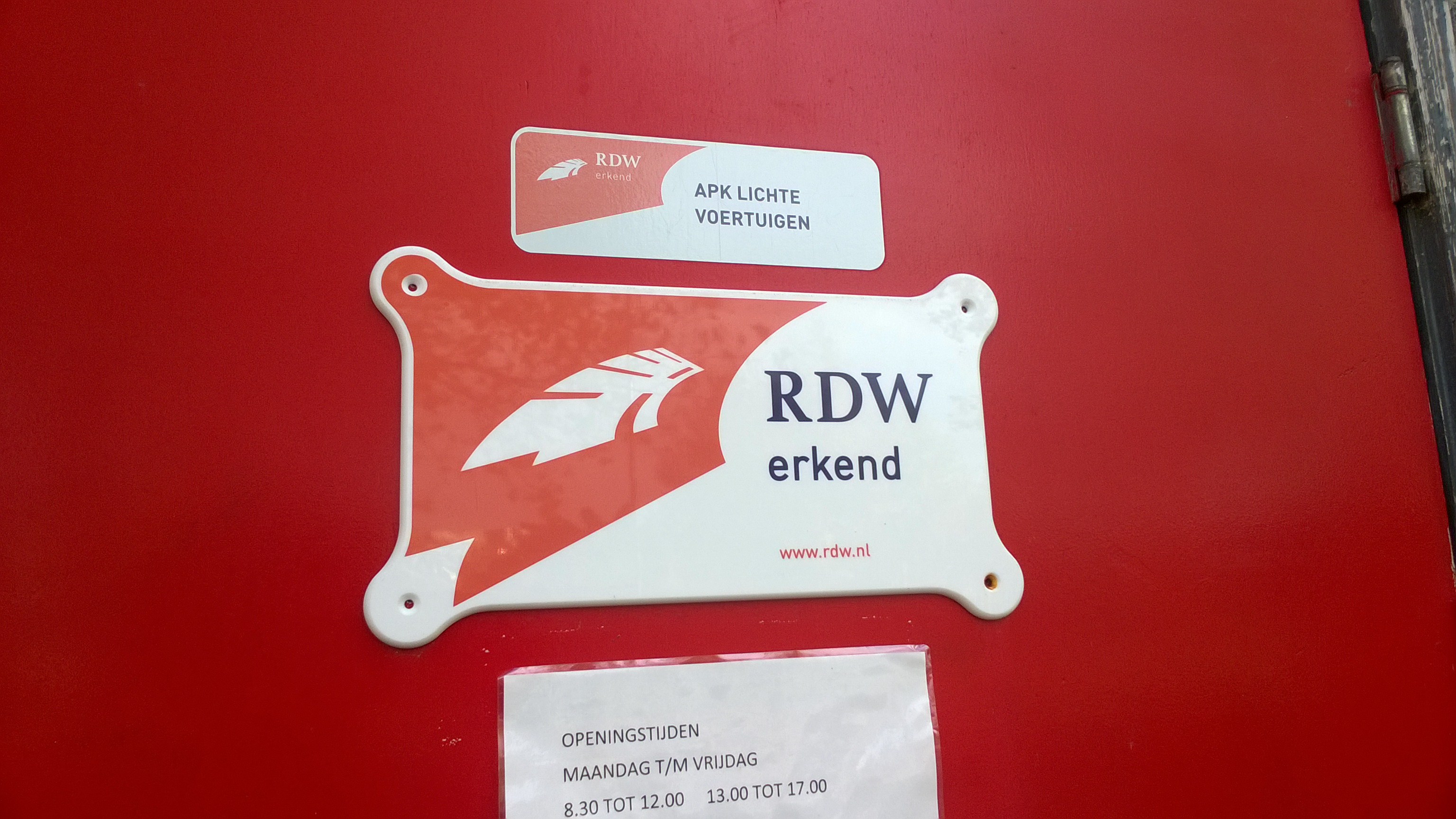
"RDW-Erkend" sign showing that a company such as a repair-shop is RDW-approved.

=== Supervision and control ===
The RDW is responsible for supervising Dutch RDW-approved garages and repair-shops for road-legal vehicles. Moreover, the RDW maintains registration of vehicles and the annual vehicle state inspection called "APK". While these inspections and repairs can be conducted by privately owned companies, these companies have to be registered with the RDW and the RDW frequently visits and samples the performance, integrity and reliability of the companies, issuing punishments for companies that are found to fraud with approvals.

=== Information provision ===
The RDW keeps multiple public databases available in regard to public parking, vehicle safety, registration and APK-history among other data and informs the public about current developments in the automotive sector. Furthermore, the RDW advises the government in law-making.

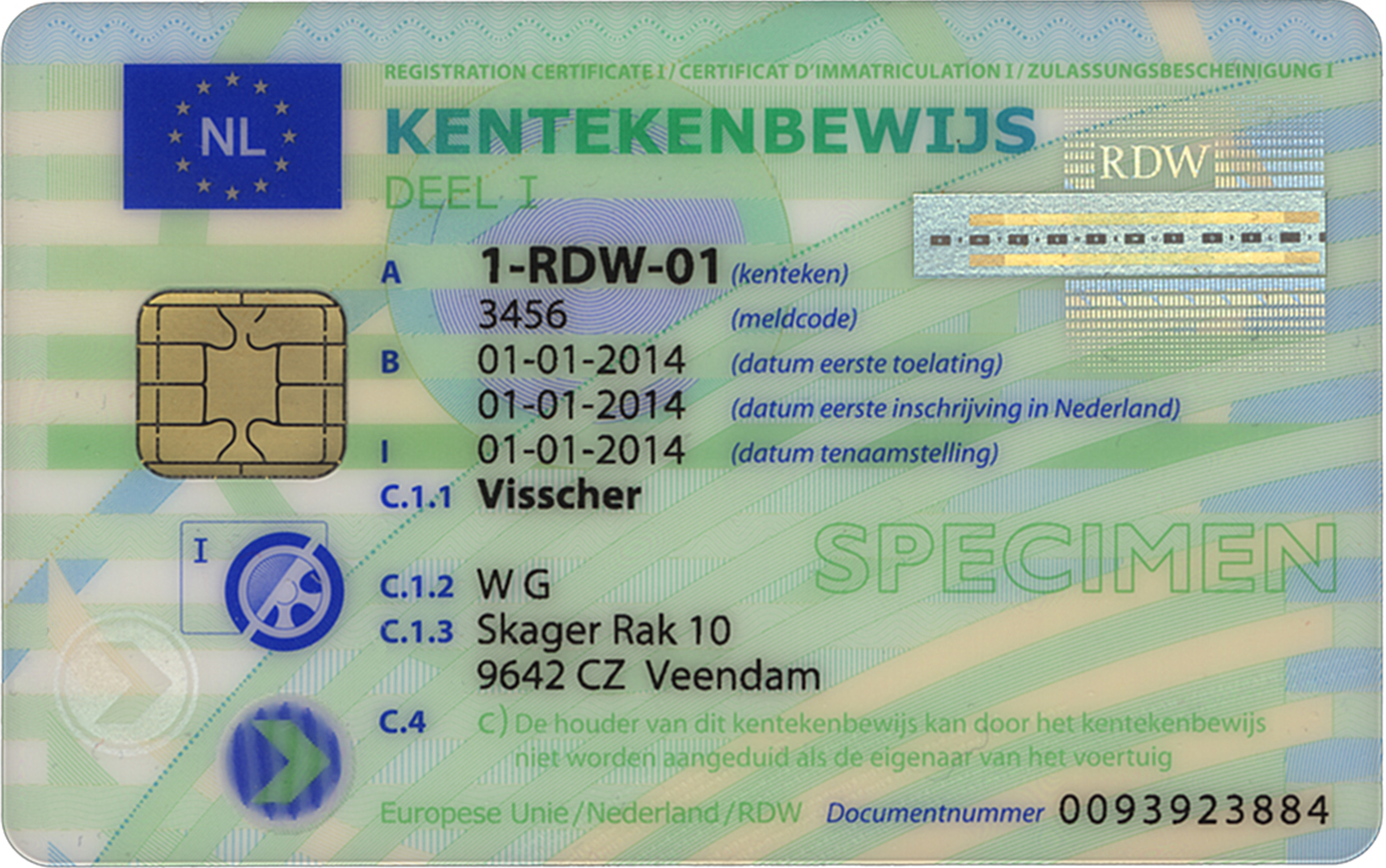
"Kentekenbewijs" or vehicle registration card indicating vehicle properties and ownership, issued by the RDW.

=== Issuing documents ===
In the Netherlands, driving licences can be acquired by graduating exams at the Centraal Bureau Rijvaardigheid (Central Bureau of Driving Skills) and requesting such cards at the municipality office of the citizen applying. The RDW is responsible for producing and issuing the physical card that individuals receive, which is also valid as personal identification in the Netherlands.

== Locations ==
The RDW has two foreign offices, one in Detroit, Michigan, United States and one in Seoul, South Korea.
