= Triumph TR6 =

British sports car

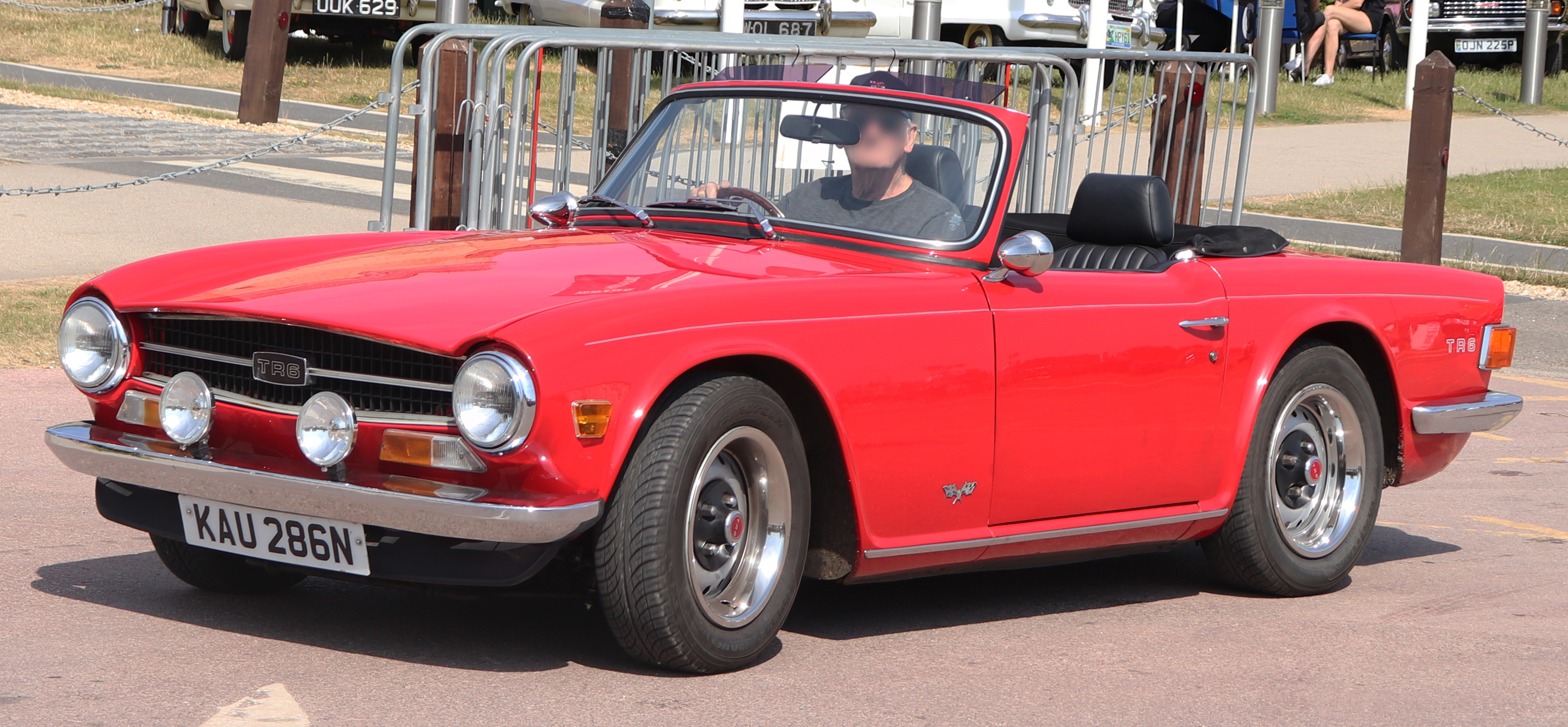

Overview
- Manufacturer: Triumph (British Leyland)
- Production: 19 September 1968 – 20 July 1976
- Model years: 1969–1976
- Assembly: United Kingdom: Coventry

Body and chassis
- Class: Open two-seater
- Body style: 2-door roadster
- Layout: FR layout

Powertrain
- Engine: 2.5-litre straight-6
- Transmission: 4-speed manual all synchromesh with optional overdrive

Dimensions
- Wheelbase: 2,235 mm (88.0 in)
- Length: 3,950 mm (155.5 in)
- Width: 1,550 mm (61.0 in)
- Height: 1,270 mm (50.0 in)
- Kerb weight: 1,130 kg (2,491 lb)

Chronology
- Predecessor: TR250 and TR5
- Successor: Triumph TR7

The Triumph TR6 is a sports car that was built by the Triumph Motor Company of England. While production began several months earlier, the TR6 was officially introduced in January as a 1969 model year vehicle. The last TR6 was produced on 14 July 1976. Of the 91,850 TR6s produced, 83,480 were exported, almost all of them to the United States, while only 8,370 were sold in the UK.

== Design and features ==
Triumph Motor Cars had a limited budget for the development of the TR6. While the Karmann-designed exterior looked considerably different from the TR4/TR4A/TR250/TR5 cars, the same chassis, engines, running gear, doors, windscreen and much of the body tub were carried over from the TR250/TR5 models. The new removable hardtop for the TR6 was designed in-house by Triumph, and was available as an option.

Construction of the TR6 was traditional body-on-frame with four-wheel independent suspension, front disc brakes and rear drum brakes.

All TR6s were powered by Triumph's 2.5-litre straight-6 engine.

The TR6 featured a four-speed manual transmission. An electrically switched overdrive made by Laycock de Normanville was available as an option. On early cars the "A-type" model overdrive was used and was able to be activated on second, third, and fourth gears and provided a 22% gear ratio reduction. Later TR6s had a "J-type" model overdrive able to be activated only on third and fourth gears but with a 28% gear ratio reduction.

Other notable features that were shared with the TR250/TR5 included aluminium semi-trailing arm independent rear suspension, rack and pinion steering, pile carpet on floors and boot, bucket seats, full instrumentation, 15-inch (380 mm) wheels and depending on the market, Michelin asymmetric XAS tyres that dramatically improved the handling. The optional steel hardtop required two people to deploy. The dashboard was a light shade of flat cut walnut veneer over plywood with a thick coating. Overdrives and hardtops were more commonly selected options, while a rear anti-roll bar and a limited-slip differential were rare.

== Production ==
The first production TR6 was built on the 19th of September 1968, as a 1969 model year. All TR6s built until the 28th of November 1968 were carburetted-engine cars with CC commission number prefixes, at which point in time petrol-injected cars with CP commission number prefixes began to be produced on the same production line.

While small changes occurred to the TR6 during its production run, the basic shape and styling cues of the TR6 remained unchanged from beginning to end.

The only factory-recognised change to the TR6 occurred in 1973, when the commission number prefixes changed. Commission numbers were the sequential alpha-numeric numbers used to identify vehicles, a system preceding the use of the modern-day Vehicle Identification Number (VIN). The "Early" CC and CP prefixes were replaced by the "Later" prefixes of CF for carburetted engines and CR for petrol-injected engines. At that time a front spoiler was added, the gauges changed notably in style, as did the horn push and horn surround, and a different optional overdrive was used (Laycock de Normanville A-type for early cars but J-type for later cars). But more importantly, the later CR petrol-injected cars received the milder camshaft that had been used in the carburetted cars, and also a change to the mechanical petrol injection pump. This reduced the power on the later CR petrol-injected cars to 125bhp but made them more drivable in traffic. The power of the later CF carburettor-engined cars was officially reported to have remained mostly the same, 104bhp to106bhp, but the continued addition of emissions equipment on later CF TR6s added complexity and reduced performance.

Apart from the Early vs. Late commission number change, small aesthetic and mechanical changes occurred throughout the production run of the TR6, as is common on most production cars.

In terms of aesthetics, when first produced some styling details were carried over from earlier Triumph TR models but soon dropped, such as short fender beads on part of the rear wings on the 1968-built and possibly very early 1969-built models. The wheel rims changed slightly starting with the 1970 model year, increasing their width from 5" to 5.5", at which time the Rostyle wheel covers (hubcaps) that were standard on the TR5, TR250, and 1969 TR6s were discontinued and centre caps were used. The 1969 models also sported a unique steering wheel and a magnetic petrol filler cap.

Different exterior and interior colours were offered in different years, with the original colour of a TR6 indicating when it was likely manufactured. For example, TR6s originally painted Royal Blue were only offered up until 1971, whereas Inca yellow was a colour only available on 1976 TR6s. Carpets on earlier cars were made of Wilton wool versus later cars had tufted nylon carpets.

Evolving US regulations incited many of the changes to the TR6. More changes occurred to the carburettor-engined CC and CF cars but some of those changes carried over to the petrol-injected CP and CR cars. For example, changes that only affected carburetted TR6s were three versions of the seats, different bumpers, three different carburettor versions, and many emissions equipment changes. Changes instigated by US regulations that carried over to the petrol-injected TR6s were things like the relocation of the ignition key under the steering wheel in order to incorporate a steering lock.

The last petrol injected TR6 was produced in July 1975 while the production of carburetted TR6s continued until the very last TR6 was produced on 14 July 1976.

== Performance ==
The early CP commission numbered petrol-injected TR6s used the same Lucas mechanical fuel-injection as the TR5, which produced 150 bhp (110 kW) (152 hp DIN) and 164 lb-ft of torque.

The early CC commission numbered US and Canada market cars, with carburettors and a lower compression ratio than the fuel-injected counterparts, were the same as used on the TR250 and only produced 104 net bhp and a peak torque of 143 lb-ft at 3500 rpm.

The early petrol-injected version TR6 could accelerate from zero to 60 mph (97 km/h) in 8.2 seconds and had a top speed of 120 mph (190 km/h) according to Autocar magazine.

The later CR petrol-injected engines were rated at 125bhp, while the later CF carburetted cars were rated at 106bhp.

== Remaining on the road ==
As of 2020, approximately 4000 licensed for use and 1300 temporarily stored SORN TR6s were registered with the DVLA in the UK. The number of licensed and SORN TR6s has increased over the past dozen years, as many Triumphs are bought in the US and shipped back to the UK and elsewhere.

== Gallery ==
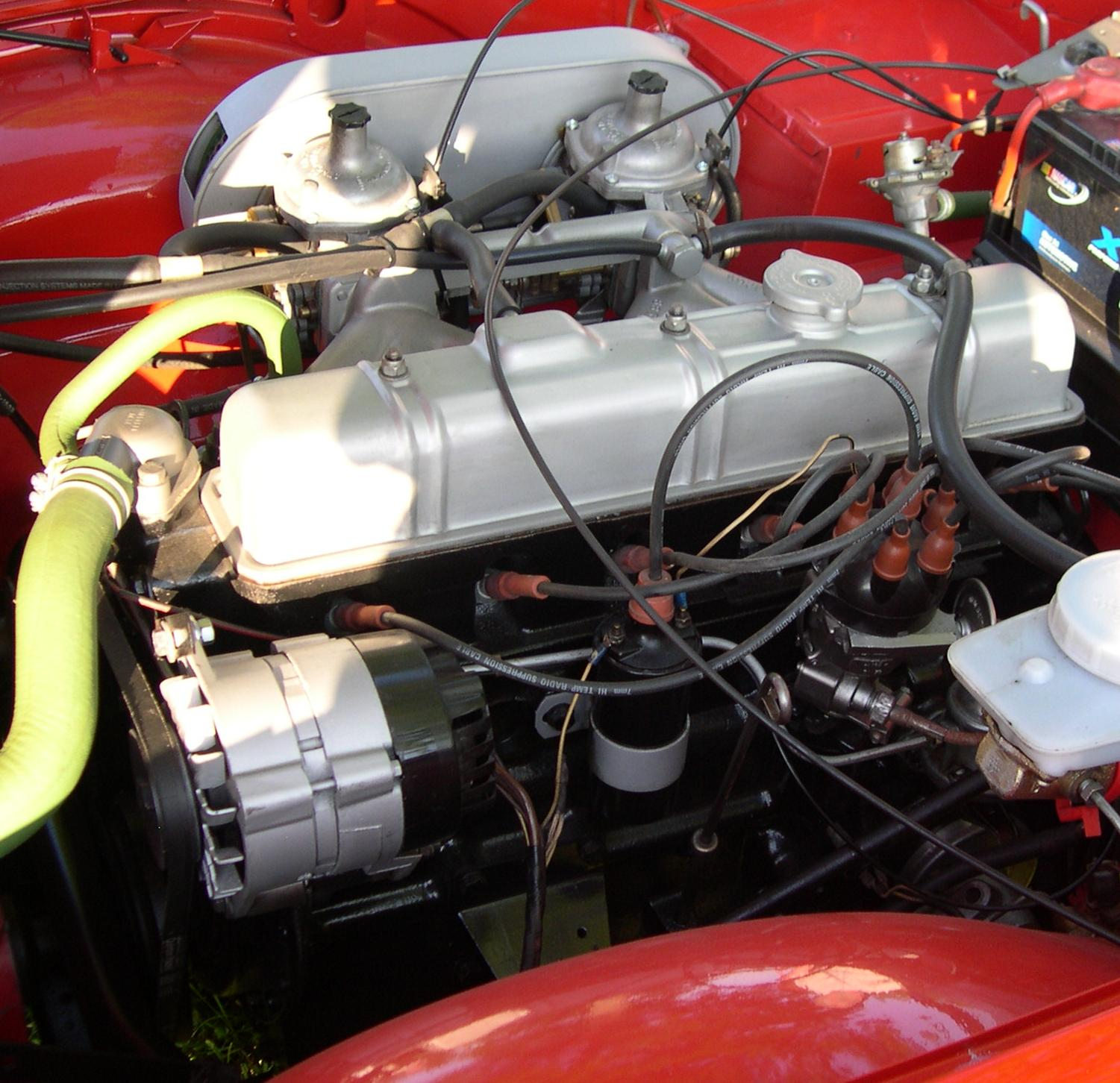
US carburettor engine, likely from 1973 or 1974

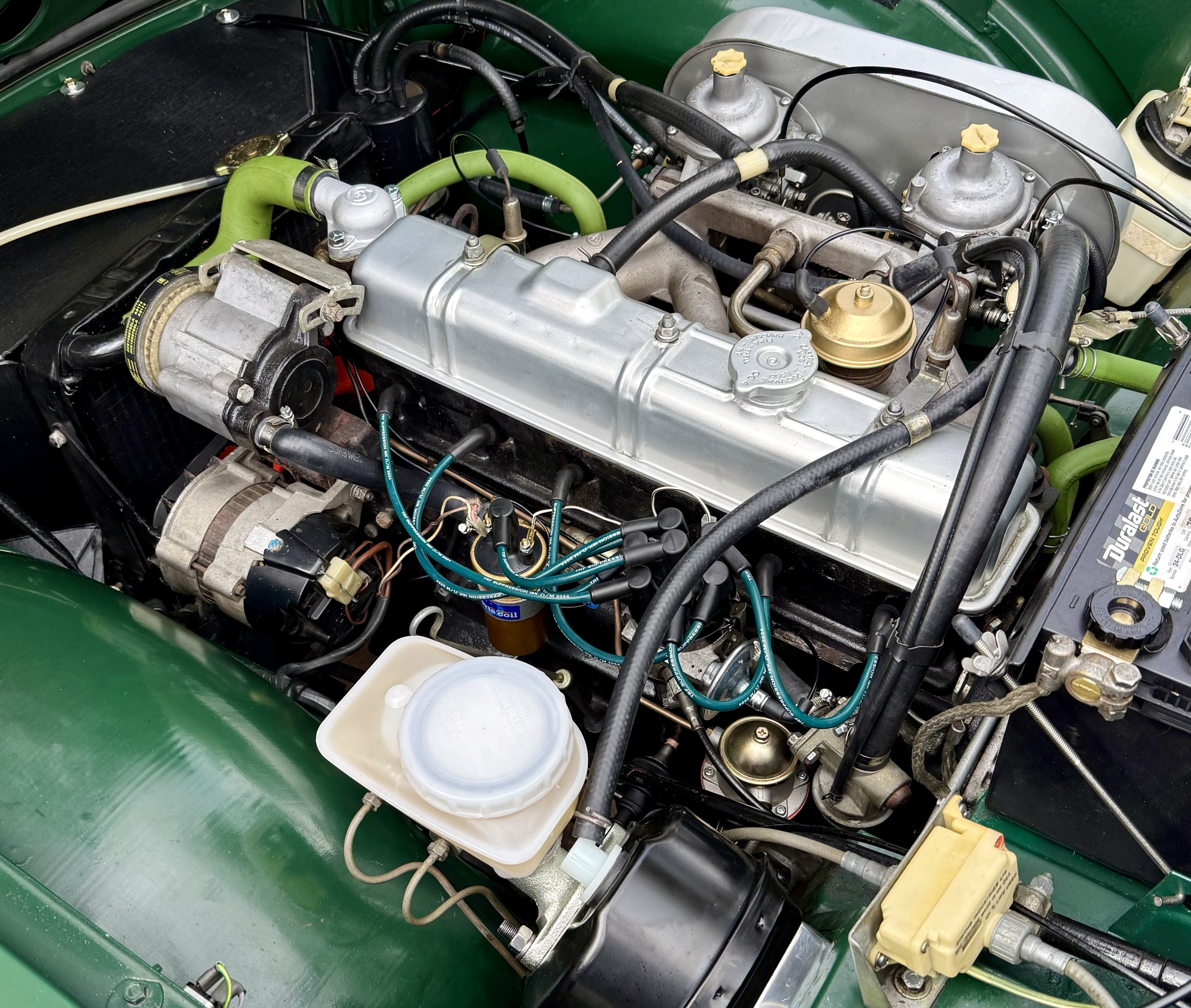
Engine with full 1976 US emissions control including smog pump, charcoal canister, EGR valve, EGR mileage counter, etc., from the final week of TR6 production, July 1976

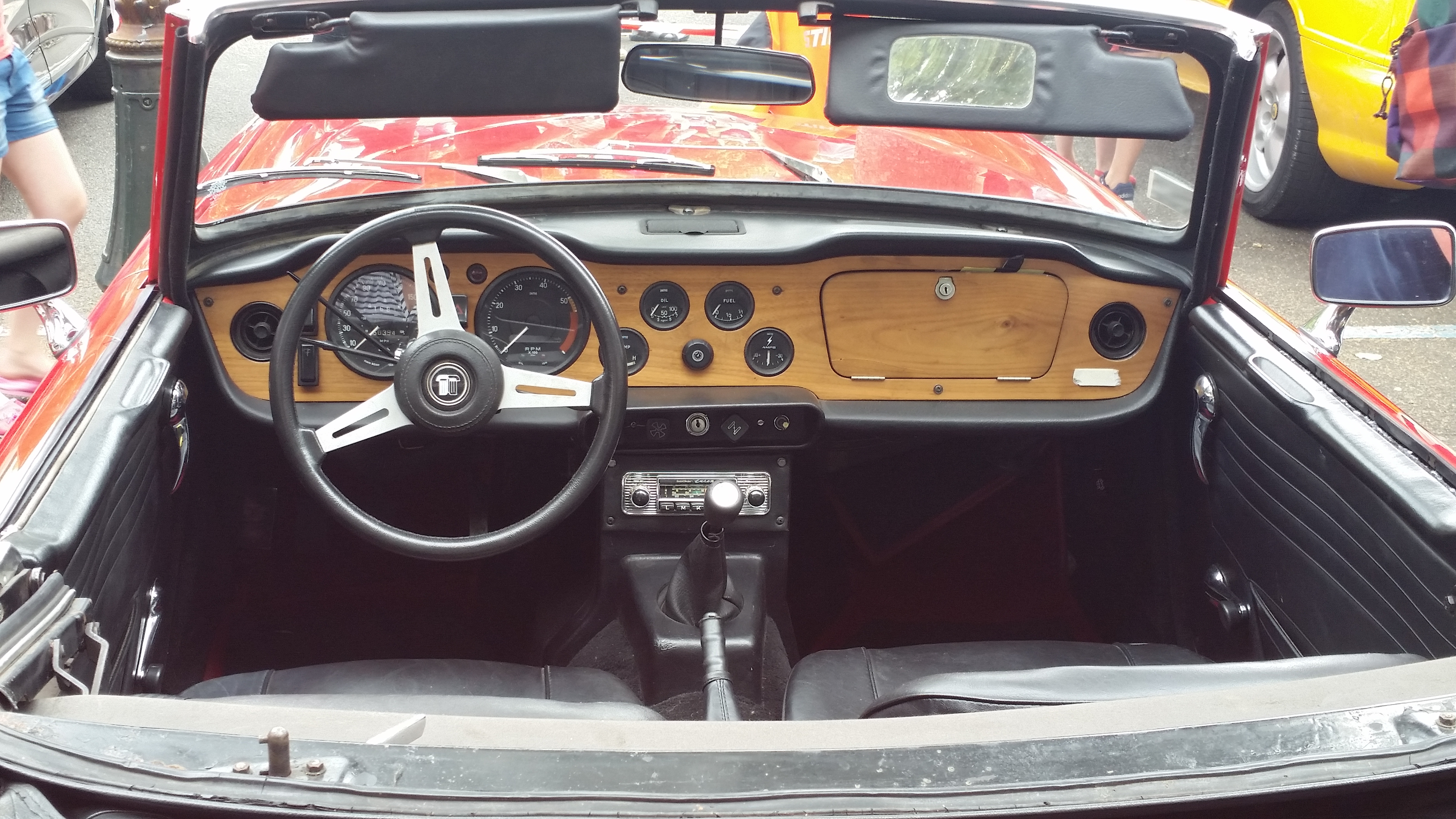
Left-hand drive interior

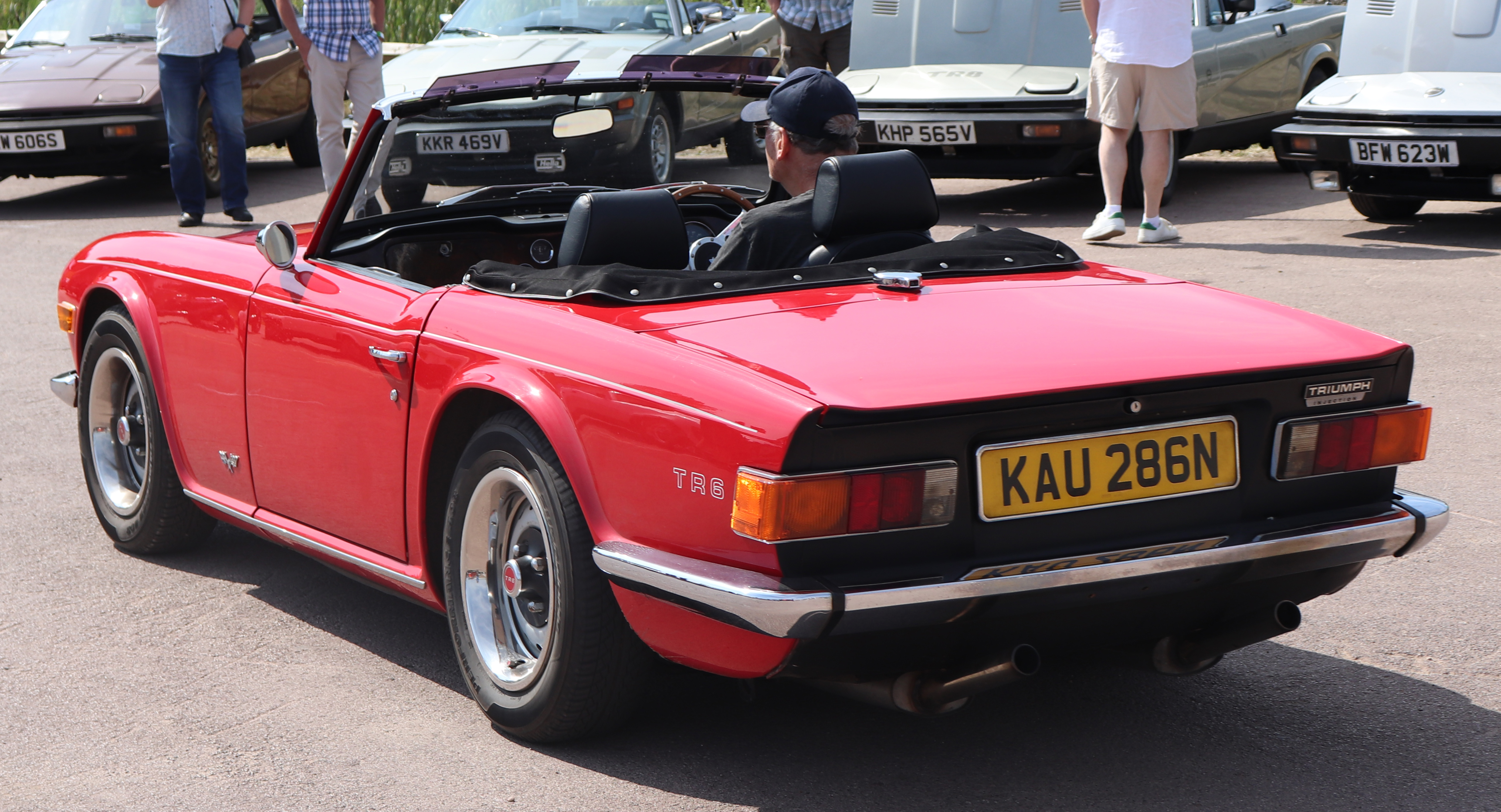
Rear quarter view

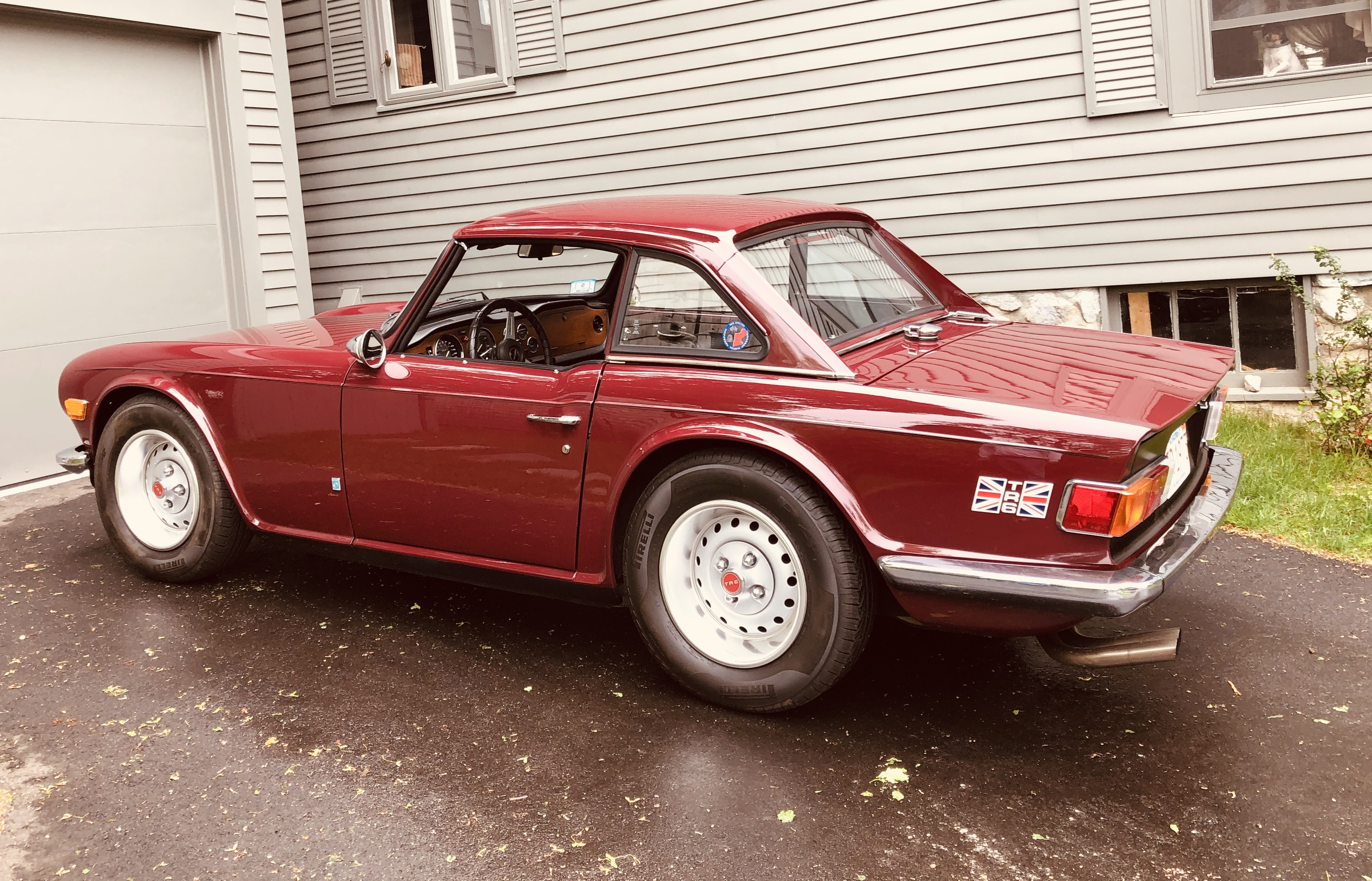
With optional removable hardtop

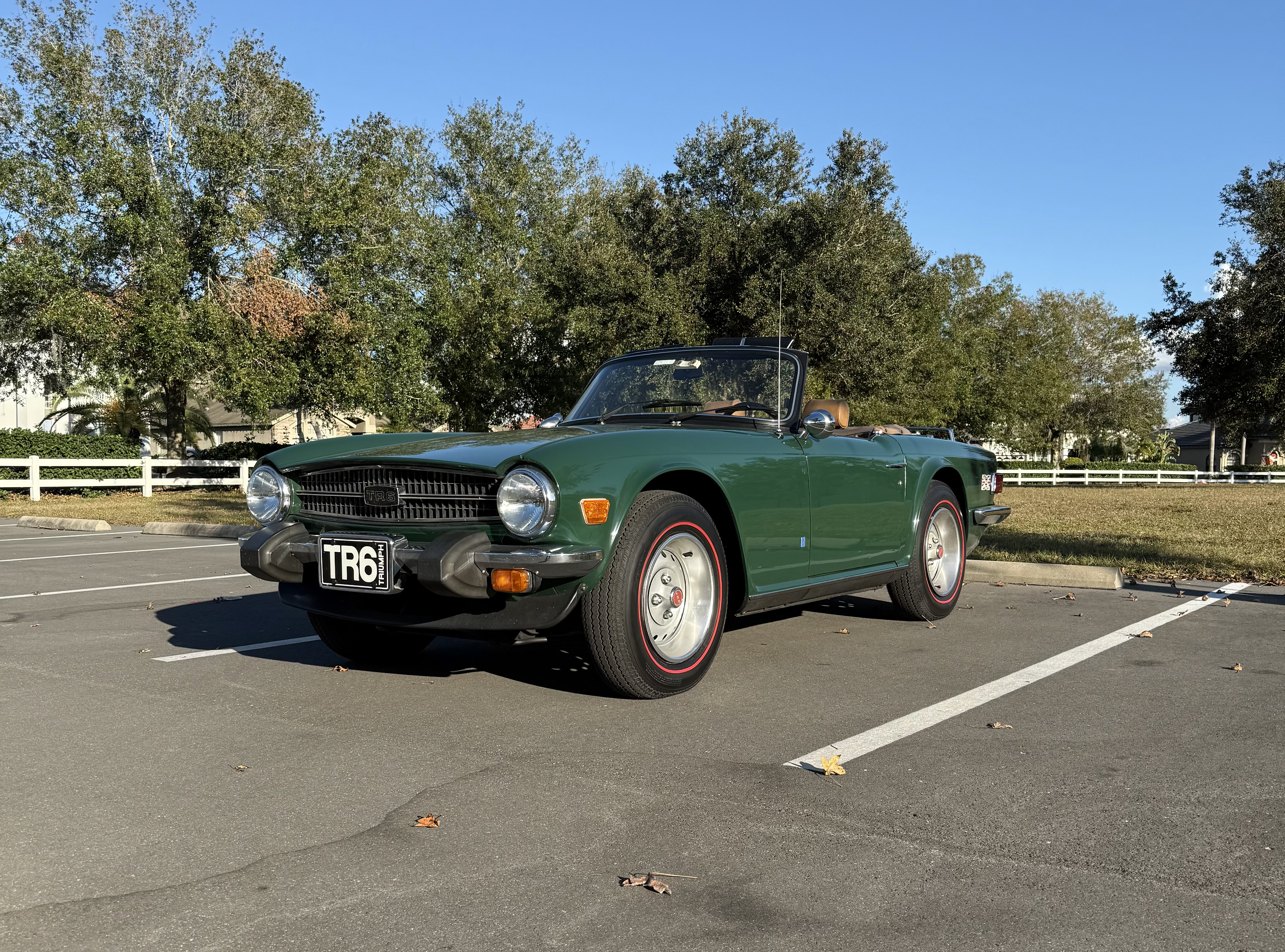
1976 model with final US bumper height and light arrangement

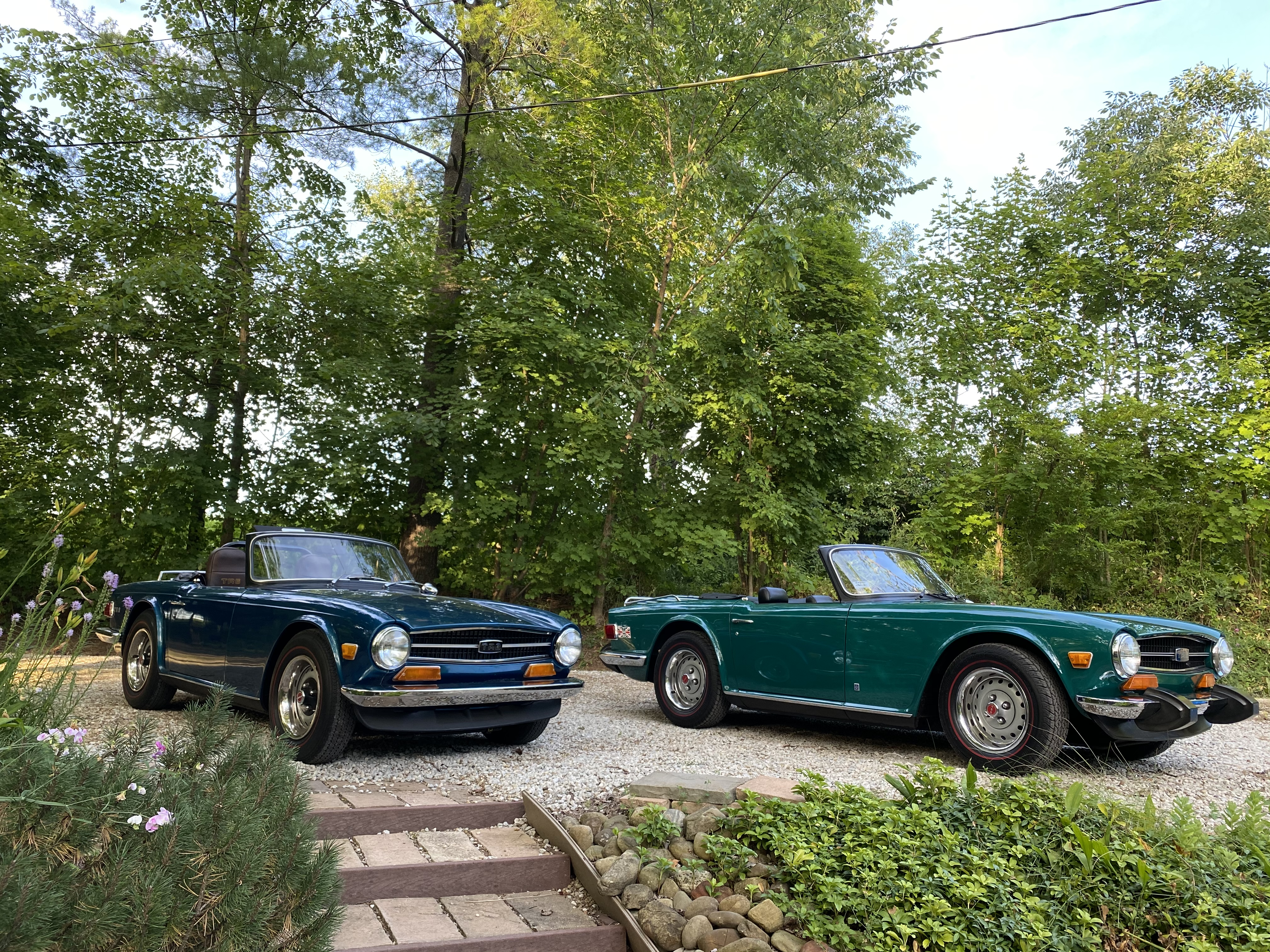
1972 and 1974
