= Stefan Lippe =

German insurance manager (1955–2020)

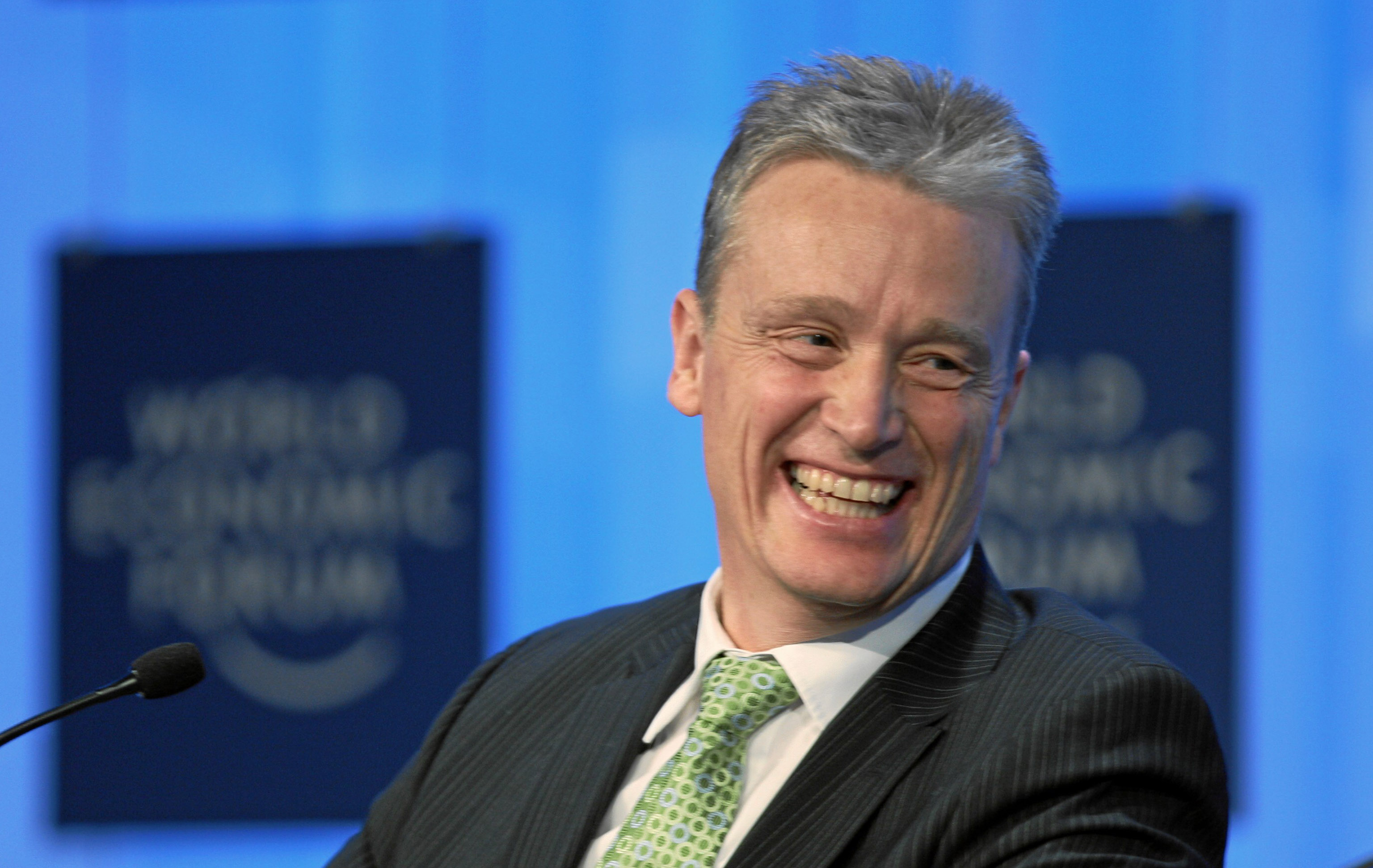
- Stefan Lippe at the World Economic Forum annual meeting in 2010
- Born: 11 October 1955; Mannheim
- Died: 27 March 2020 (aged 64)
- Education: University of Mannheim
- Occupation: CEO
- Organizations: Swiss Re
- Successor: Michel M. Liès

Stefan Lippe (11 October 1955 – 27 March 2020), was a German insurance manager. He was the CEO of Swiss Re from 2009 to 2012 when Michel M. Liès succeeded him as Swiss Re's group chief executive officer.

== Career ==
Lippe was born in Mannheim. He studied mathematics and economics at the University of Mannheim and graduated in 1982. He then was a research assistant at the chair of actuarial science at the University of Mannheim. For his dissertation he was awarded the Prize of the Kurt-Hamann-Foundation. In October 1983, he joined Bavarian Re (Munich), a subsidiary of Swiss Re. In 1986, he became head of the underwriting department, non-proportional business. In 1988, he was appointed a deputy member of the management board. In 1991, he took on overall responsibility for the activities of the company in German-speaking countries and was appointed as full member of the management board. In 1993, he was appointed chairman of the executive board of Bavarian Re and in 1995, he was appointed to the extended executive board of Swiss Re as head of the Bavarian Re Group. In 2001, he became head of the Property & Casualty Business Group and was elected to the executive board of Swiss Re. In September 2008, he was appointed chief operating officer and deputy CEO. On 12 February 2009, in an emergency situation when Swiss Re was at the brink of bankruptcy and required a US$3 billion capital injection from Berkshire Hathaway, he was appointed CEO following the dismissal of Jacques Aigrain.

He then co-founded Acqupart Holding AG, where he was vice chairman of the board of directors, and Acqufin AG. He also co-founded Paperless Inc., now yes.com AG, where he was chairman of the board of directors. He was also chairman of the board of directors of CelsiusPro AG. He became an AXA director in 2012 and chairman of the AXA audit committee in 2013.

He died on March 27, 2020, of complications from COVID-19.
