= Ameropa Foundation =

Swiss nonprofit organization

The Ameropa Foundation
- Formation: December 2001
- Founder: Andreas Zivy; Nicole Miescher
- Founded at: Binningen, Switzerland
- Type: Non-profit
- Headquarters: Binningen, Switzerland
- Key people: Andreas Zivy, Nicole Miescher
- Parent organization: Ameropa Holding AG
- Website: Official website

The Ameropa Foundation is an international nonprofit organization based in Binningen, Switzerland, that engages in humanitarian, educational and agricultural projects, primarily in developing countries. The organization was founded by Nicole Miescher and Andreas Zivy in 2001.

== History ==
In 2001, Ameropa, a Swiss, privately owned international agri-business, founded the Ameropa Foundation to support entrepreneurial and social projects in developing countries. The organization focuses on investing in sustainable charitable programs in the developing world, mainly in Africa and South America. Since its inception in 2001, the Ameropa Foundation has started over 49 projects around the world. By the end of 2016, the Ameropa Foundation reached over 62,000 beneficiaries, creating more than 5,500 jobs and educating over 31,000 children and adults.

== Activities ==
=== Brazil ===
The Ameropa Foundation has been engaged in humanitarian activities in Brazil since its early beginnings. In 2012, the organization financed the construction of a sports and cultural center, the Arena do Morro, in Mãe Luiza, Natal, Rio Grande do Norte. The Arena do Morro was designed pro bono by Swiss architects, Herzog & de Meuron, and has had a great impact on the community since its inauguration in 2014. The project has been published in various magazines across the world and has been exhibited in several museums. Its most recent exhibition is the exhibition Building Optimism at the Carnegie Museum of Art, Pittsburgh. In 2008, the Ameropa Foundation also built ADIC, a school for 300 students in Passo da Patria, a favela on the shore of Potenji River, in the outskirts of the city of Natal. The school has been supported by the foundation since, but has additionally won the support of UNESCO in the category Preparation to the world of work and youth leadership and the support of the FIFA Football for Hope.

Since 2004, the Ameropa Foundation has been supporting a vocational school for welders, mechanics and locksmiths in Rio das Ostras. Every year, approximately 60 students pass the vocational training, which is offered pro bono.

=== Romania ===
Since 2013, the Ameropa Foundation has been providing humanitarian support to Roma children in Roșia, Sibiu. In 2013, the organization co-financed the construction of a kindergarten. In 2015, the construction of a workshop to train apprentices with the goal to create jobs was co-financed.

=== Uganda ===
In January 2009, the Ameropa Foundation established a microcredit institute called FINEM in Kampala. By 2016, more than 2000 loans were given, reaching over 6,000 beneficiaries. In 2015, the Ameropa Foundation collaborated with Right To Play, an international humanitarian organization, and developed the project TUSOBOLA, which means Together we can make it. The project focuses on empowering children and youth through life skills. The project was implemented in seven schools in Kamwookya and Kyebando, slums of Kampala. Over 3,000 children were reached by the project and it is estimated that, by 2018, this educational program will reach about 6,000 school children and approximately 2,400 additional children from the communities.
