= Martin Senn =

Swiss insurance manager

- Born: March 22, 1954; Binningen, Switzerland
- Died: May 27, 2016 (aged 62); Klosters, Switzerland
- Occupation: Insurance executive
- Known for: Was the CEO of the Zurich Insurance Group
- Spouse: Guen Soo-Senn
- Children: 2

Martin Senn (born 22 March 1954, Binningen, Switzerland; † 27 May 2016, Klosters, Switzerland) was a Swiss insurance manager. He was the CEO of the Zurich Insurance Group from 2010 until December 2015.

== Early life and education ==
He was born and raised in Binningen, in the canton of Basel-Landschaft. He completed a business apprenticeship with the Swiss Bank Corporation in Basel. During his time in the Swiss armed forces, which he left as Oberleutnant, he dreamed of becoming an Aircraft pilot.

== Career ==
His subsequent career led the assets specialist via the Swiss Bank Corporation to Credit Suisse. He was only 26 years old when he took over the Hong Kong branch store of the Swiss Bank Corporation in 1983. When he joined Credit Suisse in 1994 he served as treasurer for Europe and chairman in Japan. In 2001 he joined the Credit Suisse board of directors and was appointed manager of the Trading- and Investment Services.

After his transition into the insurance industry he worked for the companies Swiss Life and Zurich Insurance Group. At Swiss Life Senn was appointed chief investment officer (CIO) in 2003 and joined the board of directors. In April 2006 after his transition to Zurich he headed up the investments unit as Chief Investment Officer (CIO) and in 2009 he replaced James J. Schiro as CEO of the Zurich Insurance Group. In December 2015 after a year of great financial loss for Zurich Senn resigned.

== Death ==
On 27 May 2016, Senn died by suicide. He was married to the Korean violinist Guen Soo-Senn and had a daughter and a son.
