= MBM Tourismo =

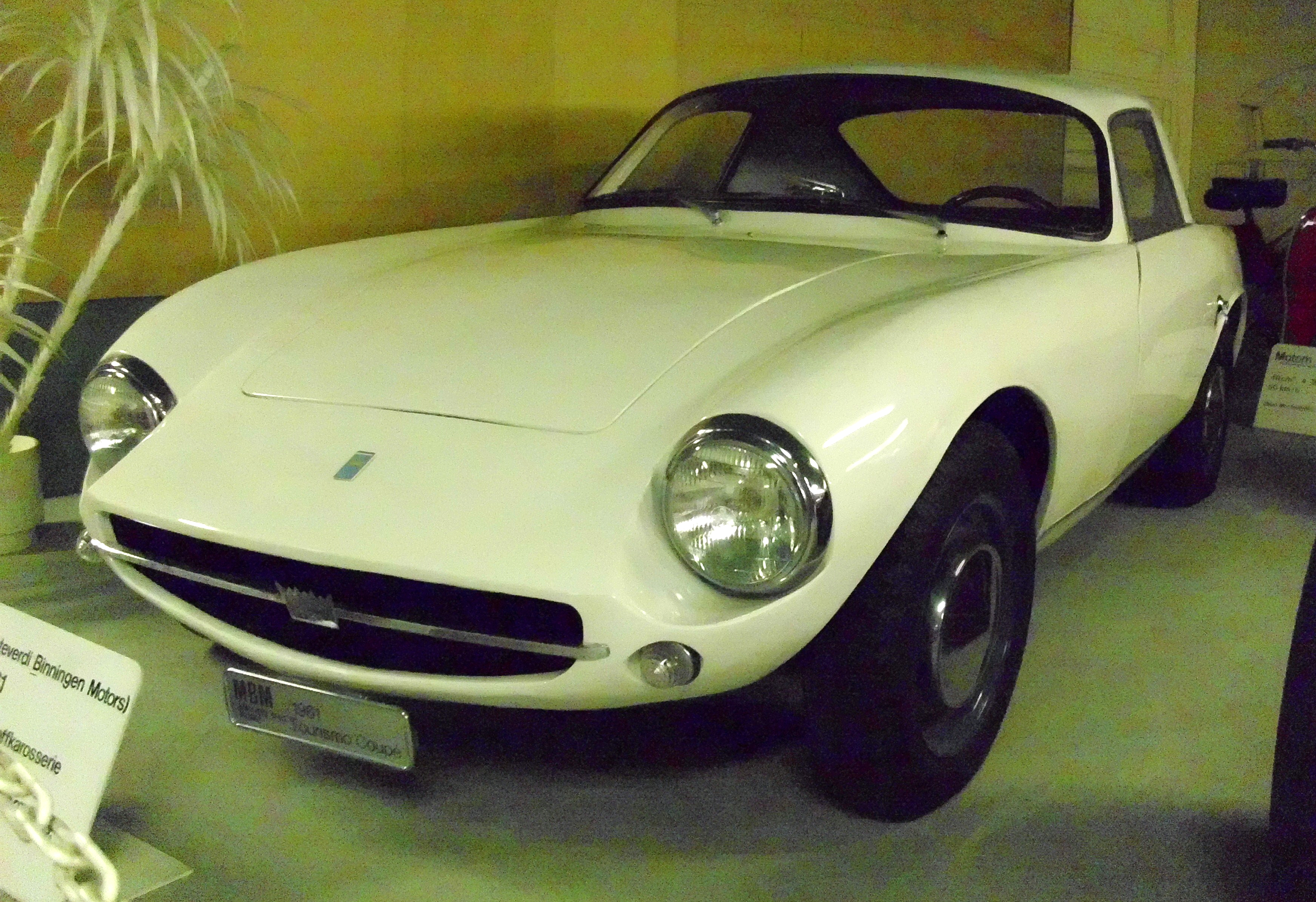

Overview
- Manufacturer: MBM
- Production: 1961-1962

Body and chassis
- Class: Grand Tourer
- Body style: 2-door 2-seater coupé
- Layout: Front-engine, rear-wheel-drive layout
- Related: Heron Europa

The MBM Tourismo was a very low-production (likely only two were built) automobile sold by Peter Monteverdi. Monteverdi's small company MBM (standing for Monteverdi Binningen Motors) mainly focused on competition, but a "few" sports cars were also produced.

MBM Tourismo at the Swiss Museum of Transport

The car's body was bought from England, where a company called Heron Plastics had developed a fiberglass sports car called the Europa. It had a backbone chassis and coil sprung wishbone front suspension, with a Triumph Herald swing axle at the rear, although it is unknown what may have been different in the MBMs. The engine was a 997 cc Ford Anglia 105E unit, as was usual for the Heron as well. A 1961 MBM Tourismo currently resides in the Swiss Transport Museum in Luzern Switzerland.

In 1960 an open two-seat sports car called the MBM Sport meant for competition was shown. The little barchetta had a 1092 cc O.S.C.A. engine with 100 PS (73.5 kW), and was front-engined unlike the Lotus and Elvas with which it was meant to compete. While offered for sale at SFr 22000 (~US$95,000 in 2016), only the one car was built.

== See also ==
- Peter Monteverdi
