= MBM (automobile) =

Swiss racing car

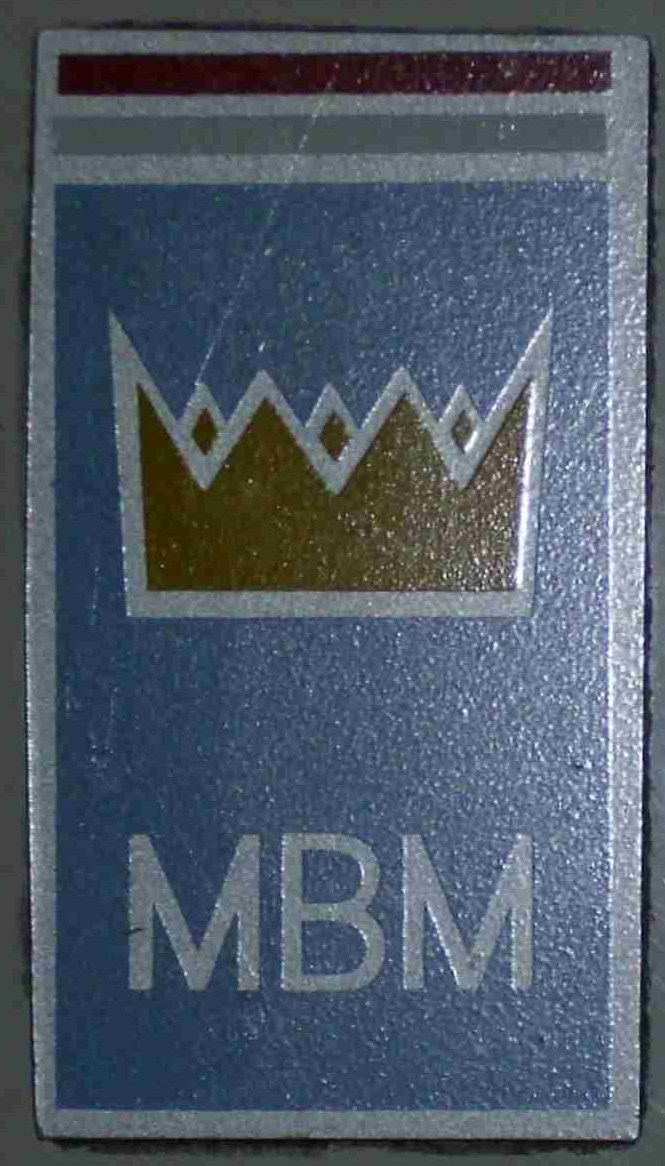
- Full name: Monteverdi Basel Motoren; Monteverdi Basel Mantzel
- Base: Binningen, Switzerland
- Founder(s): Peter Monteverdi
- Noted drivers: (Switzerland) Peter Monteverdi

Formula One World Championship career
- First entry: 1961 German Grand Prix
- Races entered: 1 (0 starts)
- Engines: Porsche
- Constructors' Championships: 0
- Drivers' Championships: 0
- Race victories: 0
- Points: 0
- Pole positions: 0
- Fastest laps: 0
- Final entry: 1961 German Grand Prix

The MBM was a Swiss racing car built to Formula One regulations. Constructed by Peter Monteverdi at his base in Binningen, the vehicle never competed in a World Championship Grand Prix.

== History ==
Monteverdi built his first single-seater racing car, a Formula Junior, in 1960, with the help of DKW engine expert Dieter Mantzel. The car was designed to be able to accommodate a 1.5-litre engine to suit the contemporary Formula One regulations.

For 1961, two MBM chassis were constructed, and fitted with Porsche Flat-4 engines, and initially driven in hillclimbs by Monteverdi himself. He then entered one of the cars in the 1961 Solitude Grand Prix, a non-championship Formula One race. Unable to set a representative time in practice, Monteverdi lined up on the grid at the back of the field, and retired with engine failure after just two laps. This car was subsequently written off in an accident at Hockenheim, and Monteverdi buried the wreckage, deciding against continuing with the project. He had entered the car for the 1961 German Grand Prix but this entry was withdrawn after the accident.

The other chassis was later exhibited in Monteverdi showrooms. Some sports cars, the MBM Special, Tourismo, and MBM Sports were also built in very limited numbers before Monteverdi began building cars under his own name in 1967.

Chassis number 2

== Results ==
=== Complete Formula One World Championship results ===
(key)

Year	Chassis	Engine	Driver	1	2	3	4	5	6	7	8	Points	WCC
1961	MBM	Porsche Flat-4		MON	NED	BEL	FRA	GBR	GER	ITA	USA	0	NC
1961	MBM	Porsche Flat-4	Peter Monteverdi						WD			0	NC

=== Complete Formula One non-championship results ===
(key)

Year	Chassis	Engine	Driver	1	2	3	4	5	6	7	8	9	10	11	12	13	14	15	16	17	18	19	20	21
1961	MBM	Porsche Flat-4		LOM	GLV	PAU	BRX	VIE	AIN	SYR	NAP	LON	SIL	SOL	KAN	DAN	MOD	FLG	OUL	LEW	VAL	RAN	NAT	RSA
1961	MBM	Porsche Flat-4	Peter Monteverdi											Ret										
