= Heron Plastics =

In 1960 Heron Plastics of Greenwich, London was well established as a manufacturer of GRP bodyshells for Austin 7 specials. One of these was used as the basis for the original Diva GT in 1961. By this time, Heron also built their own coupe, the Europa, although they did not debut it until the 1962 Racing Car Show.

The car had a steel backbone chassis with outriggers fore and aft to support the running gear. Wishbones and coil spring independent suspension provided good handling, it was claimed. The front brakes were discs while drums served at the rear. The GRP body was bonded to this chassis and plywood floorpan. The engine was a Ford straight-four OHV unit with a choice of 997 cc or 1500 cc capacity. With the larger engine, a 0 to 60 mph (97 km/h) time of 8.5 seconds was boasted with a top speed of 115 mph (185 km/h).

The Europa was sold in fully trimmed component form at £580 or in partly constructed form at £730.

Only 12 examples were produced before the Europa was shelved for financial reasons in 1964.

Peter Monteverdi's MBM Tourismo was based on the Europa.
