= James J. Schiro =

American businessman

James Joseph Schiro
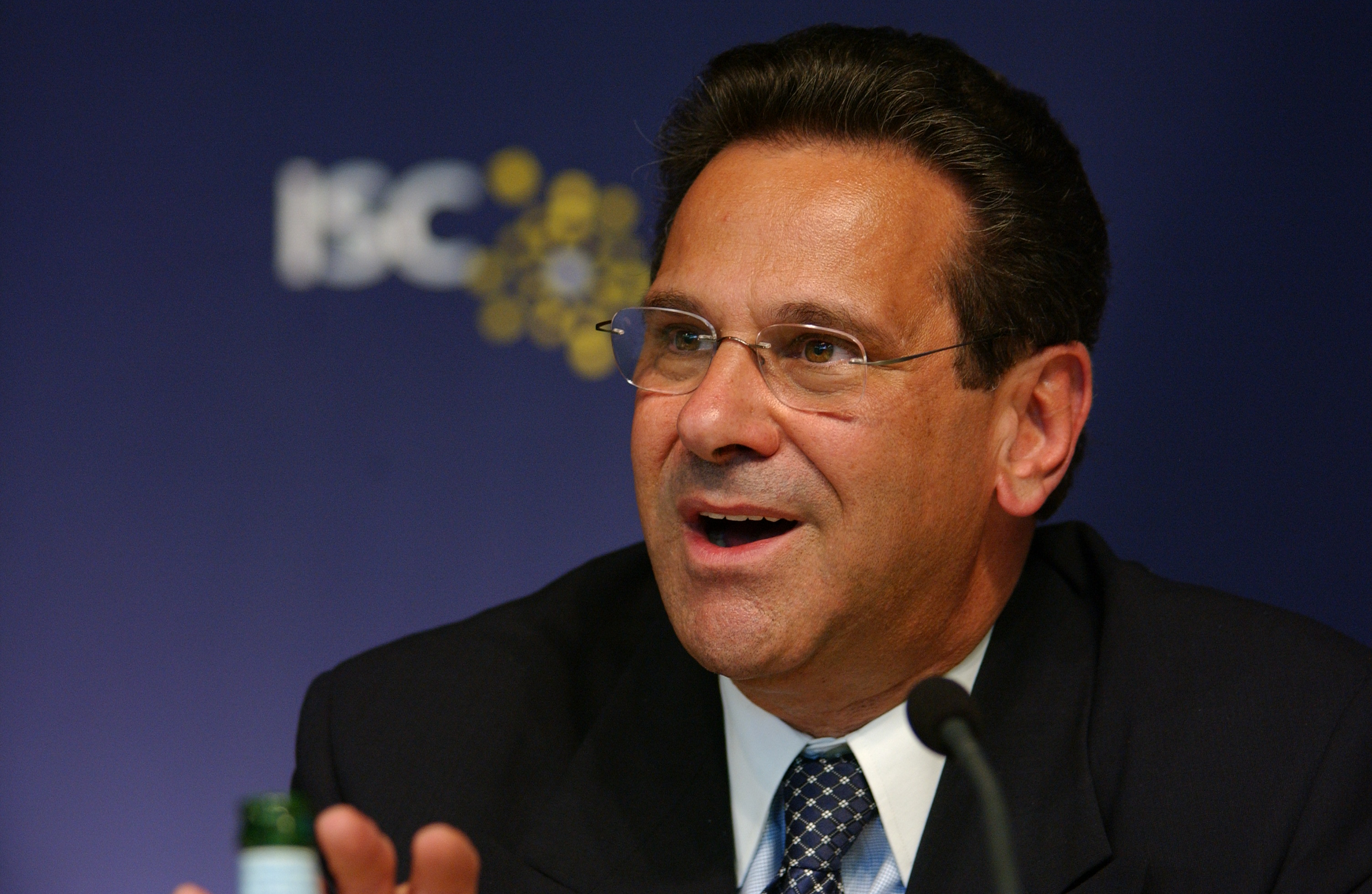
- ISC-Symposium:, 2003
- Born: January 2, 1946; Brooklyn, New York
- Died: August 13, 2014 (aged 68); Princeton, New Jersey
- Education: St. John's University (New York City)
- Occupation: Businessman
- Known for: CEO of PriceWaterhouseCoopers and Zurich Financial Services.
- Spouse: Tomasina Schiro
- Children: Justine, James Jr

James Joseph Schiro (January 2, 1946 – August 13, 2014) was an American businessman who became CEO of PriceWaterhouseCoopers and Zurich Financial Services and was a director of number of multinational companies including of PepsiCo, Philips and Goldman Sachs.

== Early life ==
James J. Schiro was born on January 2, 1946, in Brooklyn, New York. Schiro was an Italian-American of the Catholic faith. He received a Bachelor of Science from St. John's University in New York City in 1967, and an MBA from the Tuck School of Business at Dartmouth College. He was a Certified Public Accountant.

== Career ==
In 1967, he joined Price Waterhouse and worked in various managerial positions. In 1994, he became Chairman of the Board and senior partner. In 1998, after the merger of Price Waterhouse and Coopers & Lybrand, he became CEO of PricewaterhouseCoopers. From 2002 to 2006, he served as the CEO of Zurich Financial Services. He served on the Boards of Directors of PepsiCo, Philips, Goldman Sachs and REVA Medical.

He served on the board of the Geneva Association, where he was involved with the International Association for the Study of Insurance Economics, and he was a member of the European Financial Services Roundtable. He also sat on the Board of Trustees of the Institute for Advanced Study, on the Business Council of the World Economic Forum and on the Board of Directors of Initiative for a Competitive Inner City. He was the former Chairman of the Swiss-American Chamber of Commerce, and the Vice Chairman of the American Friends of Lucerne Festival. He was a member of the Independence Standards Board of the U.S. Securities and Exchange Commission, the American Institute of Certified Public Accountants, and the New York State Society of Public Accountants. He served as Treasurer and Executive Committee member of the United States Council for International Business, the British-North American Committee, the Tri-State United Way Board of Governors, and Board member of the United States-China Business Council.

== Honors and politics ==
He served on the Board of Trustees of his alma mater, St. John's University, and on the Advisory Board of the Tsinghua School of Economics and Management in Beijing. He received the Avenue of the Americas Association's Gold Key Award in 1992, the Ellis Island Medal of Honor in 1994, and the American Jewish Committee's National Human Relations Award in 1997.

A Republican, he supported John McCain for President in 2000 and 2008, and George W. Bush in 2004. He supported Al D'Amato and Rudy Giuliani.

== Personal life ==
He was married to Tomasina Schiro, and they have two children, Justine and James Jr.

He died in Princeton, New Jersey on August 13, 2014, of multiple myeloma. He was 68 years old.
