= Mario Greco =

Italian businessman

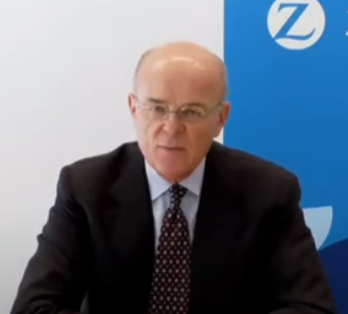
- Greco in 2021
- Born: 16 June 1959 (age 67); Naples, Italy
- Education: University of Rome; University of Rochester
- Occupation: Businessman
- Title: CEO, Zurich Insurance Group
- Term: May 2016 – present
- Board member of: Gruppo Editoriale L’Espresso; Indesit; Pirelli; Saras

Mario Greco (born 16 June 1959) is an Italian businessman and the chief executive officer (CEO) of Zurich Insurance.

== Early life ==
Mario Greco was born on 16 June 1959 in Naples. He received a bachelor's degree in economics from the University of Rome in 1983, and a master's degree in international economics and monetary theory from the University of Rochester in New York State in 1986.

== Career ==
Greco began his career in management consulting. From 1986 to 1994, he worked for McKinsey & Company in Milan, where he became a partner in 1992 and later partner leader in the insurance sector. In 1995, he joined RAS (Allianz Group) in Milan as head of the claims department. The following year, he was appointed general manager of the insurance business, and in 1998, managing director. In 2000, he became CEO of the company. At the end of 2004, he was appointed to the Allianz AG executive board, where he was responsible for business in France, Italy, Spain, Portugal, Greece and Turkey. In April 2005, Greco joined Sanpaolo IMI in Milan, where he was CEO of EurizonVita. In October 2005, he was appointed CEO of Eurizon Financial. He joined Zurich Insurance in 2007 as CEO of Global Life and became CEO of General Insurance in 2010.

Greco was CEO of Generali from August 2012 until January 2016.

He is a board member of Gruppo Editoriale L’Espresso, Indesit, Pirelli and Saras.

Since March 2016, Greco has been CEO of Zurich Insurance.
