= Diva (car manufacturer) =

Diva was a British manufacturer of sports cars from 1961 to 1966. It was a subsidiary of the Tunex Conversions Co set up by Don Sim in Camberwell, London, but in 1966 Diva Cars Limited became its registered name. In 1967, after car production ceased, the name changed again to Skodek Engineering.

The first Diva was intended to demonstrate Tunex's technology and had a body built by Heron Plastics and was a development of their 750 model. The car was raced successfully and another was built with larger windscreen and called the B-Type. Demand grew from enthusiasts for more of them so a "production" version of the GT was developed.

The 1963 Diva GT or C-Type had a fibreglass body and spaceframe chassis and could be built with a range of Ford engines ranging from 998 to 1650 cc. Suspension was independent all round and disc brakes were fitted at the front. The car was designed for track use only. Thirteen were built, but one only was registered for the road: the Diva GT C Type registered ACD 305B. This car won Best Car at the Southern Kit Car Meeting held at Hindhead on 17 September 1978 for its owner Steve Pethybridge. The car is currently in Germany.

The 1965 D-Type had a longer nose and headlights so road use was possible. Fifty one were made.

A mid-engined Diva, the Demon, was exhibited at the 1965 Racing Car Show in London using a mid-mounted Hillman Imp engine. This was changed later in the year for a Ford 1500 cc unit and the car was launched as the Valkyr. Six were made including the prototype.

The only car designed specifically for road rather than racing was the 10F, a version of the GT which used thicker fibreglass bodywork and a flexibly mounted engine. As some road going GTs were also called 10Fs the actual number made in uncertain but would seem to be less than ten.

Production of cars had stopped by 1967 when the rights to the model were sold to a new owner.

== Models ==
Models included:

- Diva GT B Type
- Diva GT C Type
- Diva GT D Type
- Diva Valkyr
- Diva 10F

== See also ==
- Heron Plastics
- List of car manufacturers of the United Kingdom
