= 1961 German Grand Prix =

Race details
- Date: 6 August 1961
- Official name: XXIII Grosser Preis von Deutschland
- Location: Nürburgring; Nürburg, West Germany
- Course: Public road/Permanent racing facility
- Course length: 22.810 km (14.173 miles)
- Distance: 15 laps, 342.150 km (212.602 miles)
- Weather: Wet

Pole position
Driver	(United States) Phil Hill	Ferrari
- Time: 8.55.2

Fastest lap
Driver	(United States) Phil Hill	Ferrari
- Time: 8.57.8 on lap 10

Podium
First	(United Kingdom) Stirling Moss	Lotus-Climax
Second	(Germany) Wolfgang von Trips	Ferrari
Third	(United States) Phil Hill	Ferrari

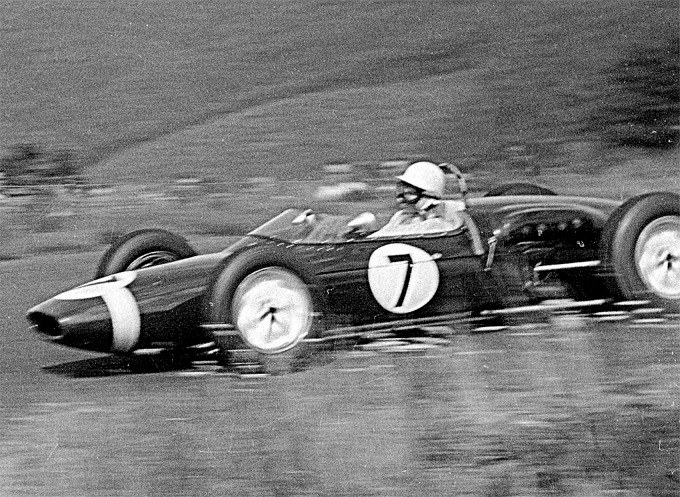
Stirling Moss in his winning Lotus-Climax

The 1961 German Grand Prix was the 23rd time the German Grand Prix (or Grosser Preis von Deutschland) motor race was held. The race also held the honorary designation of the 21st European Grand Prix. It was run to Formula One regulations as race 6 of 8 in both the 1961 World Championship of Drivers and the 1961 International Cup for Formula One Manufacturers It was held on 6 August 1961 over 15 laps of the giant 14.2 mile Nürburgring Nordschleife circuit for a race distance of almost 213 miles. The race also celebrated the 100th race since the establishment of the World Championship in 1950.

The race was won by British driver Stirling Moss, driving a Lotus 18/21 for privateer outfit the Rob Walker Racing Team; it proved to be his 16th and last Grand Prix victory. Moss started from the second row of the grid and led every lap of the race. It was the first German Grand Prix victory for a rear-engined car since Bernd Rosemeyer's Auto Union Type C took victory in 1936. Moss finished just over 20 seconds ahead of Ferrari 156 drivers Wolfgang von Trips and Phil Hill, breaking a four-race consecutive run of Ferrari victories. The result pushed Moss into third place in the championship points race, becoming the only driver outside Ferrari's trio of von Trips, Hill and Richie Ginther still in contention to become the 1961 World Champion with two races left.

Jack Brabham's Cooper took full advantage of the new Coventry-Climax V-8 in qualifying. Brabham qualified second, and shot to the lead by the first corner. However, Brabham crashed before the end of the first lap due to a sticking throttle. It was the last home country appearance for points leader von Trips before his death at the Italian Grand Prix five weeks later. His second-place finish saw Ferrari secure the constructors' championship. The remaining championship points scorers were all from British racing teams. Scottish driver Jim Clark (Lotus 21) was fourth for Team Lotus; former motorcycle World Champion John Surtees (Cooper T53) was fifth for Yeoman Credit Racing and young New Zealander Bruce McLaren was sixth in his factory-run Cooper T58.

Of the race's 26 starters, 17 finished the race with 16 of them classified finishers. Bernard Collomb (Cooper T53) did not complete the 75% race distance in order to be classified as a finisher.

== Classification ==
=== Qualifying ===
Pos	No	Driver	Constructor	Qualifying times			Gap
Pos	No	Driver	Constructor	Q1	Q2	Q3	Gap
1	4	(United States) Phil Hill	Ferrari	9:10.2	8:55.2	9:07.9	—
2	1	(Australia) Jack Brabham	Cooper-Climax	9:10.6	9:10.6	9:01.4	+6.2
3	7	(United Kingdom) Stirling Moss	Lotus-Climax	9:10.5	9:11.4	9:01.7	+6.5
4	8	(Sweden) Jo Bonnier	Porsche	9:06.6	9:04.8	9:11.3	+9.6
5	3	(West Germany) Wolfgang von Trips	Ferrari	9:23.5	No time	9:05.5	+10.3
6	17	(United Kingdom) Graham Hill	BRM-Climax	9:18.6	9:13.5	9:06.4	+11.2
7	9	(United States) Dan Gurney	Porsche	9:13.3	9:06.6	9:16.9	+11.4
8	14	(United Kingdom) Jim Clark	Lotus-Climax	9:20.9	9:08.1	9:37.9	+12.9
9	16	(United Kingdom) Tony Brooks	BRM-Climax	9:50.2	9:10.5	9:09.3	+14.1
10	18	(United Kingdom) John Surtees	Cooper-Climax	9:39.9	9:11.2	9:19.8	+16.0
11	11	(West Germany) Hans Herrmann	Porsche	9:19.2	9:12.7	9:24.6	+17.5
12	2	(New Zealand) Bruce McLaren	Cooper-Climax	9:22.4	9:13.0	9:14.4	+17.8
13	6	(Belgium) Willy Mairesse	Ferrari	9:32.7	9:15.9	9:23.5	+20.7
14	5	(United States) Richie Ginther	Ferrari	9:23.8	9:16.6	9:20.1	+21.4
15	19	(United Kingdom) Roy Salvadori	Cooper-Climax	9:41.1	9:22.0	9:25.2	+26.8
16	15	(United Kingdom) Innes Ireland	Lotus-Climax	9:22.9	9:38.1	9:23.2	+27.7
17	31	(Netherlands) Carel Godin de Beaufort	Porsche	9:39.8	9:28.4	9:29.7	+33.2
18	28	(United Kingdom) Jackie Lewis	Cooper-Climax	9:42.3	9:35.0	9:31.4	+36.2
19	32	(Italy) Lorenzo Bandini	Cooper-Maserati	9:43.2	9:35.4	9:40.9	+40.2
20	37	(United Kingdom) Tony Marsh	Lotus-Climax	9:52.3	9:37.7	No time	+42.5
21	20	(France) Maurice Trintignant	Cooper-Maserati	10:08.6	10:04.6	9:38.5	+43.3
22	33	(South Africa) Tony Maggs	Lotus-Climax	16:21.9	10:04.4	9:45.5	+50.3
23	26	(West Germany) Wolfgang Seidel	Lotus-Climax	9:59.9	No time	No time	+1:04.7
24	30	(United Kingdom) Ian Burgess	Cooper-Climax	11:00.7	10:22.6	10:01.4	+1:06.2
25	27	(United Kingdom) Gerry Ashmore	Lotus-Climax	10:37.9	10:18.2	10:06.0	+1:10.8
26	38	(France) Bernard Collomb	Cooper-Climax	10:41.8	10:23.0	10:30.8	+1:27.8
27	25	(Switzerland) Michael May	Lotus-Climax	17:00.9	No time	10:37.5	+1:42.3

=== Race ===
Pos	No	Driver	Constructor	Laps	Time/Retired	Grid	Points
1	7	(United Kingdom) Stirling Moss	Lotus-Climax	15	2:18:12.4	3	9
2	3	(West Germany) Wolfgang von Trips	Ferrari	15	+21.4 secs	5	6
3	4	(United States) Phil Hill	Ferrari	15	+22.5 secs	1	4
4	14	(United Kingdom) Jim Clark	Lotus-Climax	15	+1:17.1	8	3
5	18	(United Kingdom) John Surtees	Cooper-Climax	15	+1:53.1	10	2
6	2	(New Zealand) Bruce McLaren	Cooper-Climax	15	+2:41.4	12	1
7	9	(United States) Dan Gurney	Porsche	15	+3:23.1	7	
8	5	(United States) Richie Ginther	Ferrari	15	+5:23.1	14	
9	28	(United Kingdom) Jackie Lewis	Cooper-Climax	15	+5:23.7	18	
10	19	(United Kingdom) Roy Salvadori	Cooper-Climax	15	+12:11.5	15	
11	33	(South Africa) Tony Maggs	Lotus-Climax	14	+1 Lap	22	
12	30	(United Kingdom) Ian Burgess	Cooper-Climax	14	+1 Lap	24	
13	11	(West Germany) Hans Herrmann	Porsche	14	+1 Lap	11	
14	31	(Netherlands) Carel Godin de Beaufort	Porsche	14	+1 Lap	17	
15	37	(United Kingdom) Tony Marsh	Lotus-Climax	13	+2 Laps	20	
16	27	(United Kingdom) Gerry Ashmore	Lotus-Climax	13	+2 Laps	25	
Ret	6	(Belgium) Willy Mairesse	Ferrari	13	Accident	13	
Ret	20	(France) Maurice Trintignant	Cooper-Maserati	12	Engine	21	
NC	38	(France) Bernard Collomb	Cooper-Climax	11	Not classified	26	
Ret	32	(Italy) Lorenzo Bandini	Cooper-Maserati	10	Engine	19	
Ret	16	(United Kingdom) Tony Brooks	BRM-Climax	6	Engine	9	
Ret	8	(Sweden) Jo Bonnier	Porsche	5	Engine	4	
Ret	26	(West Germany) Wolfgang Seidel	Lotus-Climax	3	Handling	23	
Ret	17	(United Kingdom) Graham Hill	BRM-Climax	1	Accident	16	
Ret	15	(United Kingdom) Innes Ireland	Lotus-Climax	1	Fire	6	
Ret	1	(Australia) Jack Brabham	Cooper-Climax	0	Accident	2	
DNS	25	(Switzerland) Michael May	Lotus-Climax		Practice accident		
WD	10	(West Germany) Edgar Barth	Porsche		Car unraceworthy		
DNA	12	(United States) Masten Gregory	Cooper-Climax		Left the team		
DNA	21	(Italy) Giorgio Scarlatti	De Tomaso-Alfa Romeo		Car not ready		
DNA	29	(Switzerland) Piero Monteverdi	MBM-Porsche		Car destroyed		
DNA	34	(Italy) Renato Pirocchi	Cooper-Climax		Team withdrawal		
DNA	35	(United Kingdom) Geoff Duke	Cooper-Climax		Car not ready		
DNA	39	(United Kingdom) John Campbell-Jones	Cooper-Climax		Not present		

== Championship standings after the race ==
Drivers' Championship standings

	Pos	Driver	Points
	1	(Germany) Wolfgang von Trips	33
	2	(United States) Phil Hill	29
1	3	(United Kingdom) Stirling Moss	21
1	4	(United States) Richie Ginther	16
2	5	(United Kingdom) Jim Clark	11

Constructors' Championship standings

Pos	Constructor	Points
1	(Italy) Ferrari	38 (44)
2	(United Kingdom) Lotus-Climax	24
3	(Germany) Porsche	11
4	(United Kingdom) Cooper-Climax	10 (11)
5	(United Kingdom) BRM-Climax	1

- Notes: Only the top five positions are included for both sets of standings. Only the best 5 results counted towards the Championship. Numbers without parentheses are Championship points; numbers in parentheses are total points scored.

Previous race: 1961 British Grand Prix	FIA Formula One World Championship; 1961 season	Next race: 1961 Italian Grand Prix
Previous race: 1960 German Grand Prix	German Grand Prix	Next race: 1962 German Grand Prix
Previous race: 1960 Italian Grand Prix	European Grand Prix (Designated European Grand Prix)	Next race: 1962 Dutch Grand Prix
