= Andreas Zivy =

Swiss businessman

- Born: Andreas Zivy; October 19, 1955 (age 71); Binningen, Switzerland
- Occupation: Businessman
- Years active: 1978–present
- Known for: Ameropa Holding; Ameropa Foundation

Andreas Zivy (born October 19, 1955) is a Swiss businessman based in Binningen, Switzerland. He is the chairman of Swiss agribusiness Ameropa Holding AG.

== Life and career ==
Zivy was born in Basel in 1955. He completed his school education at Humanistic Secondary School, Basel. He attended Instituts d'études politiques in Paris where he received his master's degree in political science, in 1978.

After graduation, Zivy worked for Bunge, in Brazil for two years. In 1980, he joined Ameropa Holding, his family business established in 1948, as the Office Head at Ameropa, France.

In 1986, Zivy became the Vice President of Ameropa AG in Basel. By 1995 he was appointed the CEO of Ameropa AG and a member of the board of directors.

In 2001, Zivy co-founded the Ameropa Foundation, which is focused on investing in sustainable and progressive charitable programs in the developing world. As of 2010, after the death of his father, Andreas took over as the chairman and the president of Ameropa Holding AG. He is also a former member of the advisory board of the Basel Peace Forum.

In March 2019, Ameropa Group announced the impending departure of CEO Jan Kadanik and confirmed that Zivy, CEO of Ameropa Holdings AG, would act as CEO of Ameropa Group until a new CEO would be appointed. In December 2019, Zivy handed over to Ameropa Group's newly appointed CEO, William Dujardin.

== Controversy ==
In 2017, following the request of a minority stakeholder in Toaz, Russian prosecutors began investigating allegations that Nitrochem Distribution AG, owned by Ameropa Group, owned by Zivy, was involved in fraudulent sale schemes around Russia's biggest chemical plant Togliattiazot, in which Ameropa was an indirect shareholder, generating hundreds of millions of dollars profits. At the Russian government’s request, in 2014, Zivy was "arrested in absentia" and was put on INTERPOL's wanted list. In July 2019, the Komsomolsky District Court of Togliatti (Russia) convicted Zivy, together with others, of "large-scale fraud committed by an organized group" and sentenced him, in his absence, to 9 years imprisonment.

Non-Russian courts, journalists, academics, and international organisations, have criticized the affair, describing it as "a classic example of Russian corporate siege and raiding practices" and “flagrantly unfair”. Two reports from Russia experts from George Mason University highlighted the case as one of the most comprehensive illegal corporate raids in Russia involving malicious prosecution. Interpol has said "there is a predominant political dimension to this case" and concluded that a Russian request for Mr. Zivy’s arrest "does not satisfy the requirements of Interpol’s Constitution". A UK Magistrate’s Court, in rejecting Russia’s extradition request for one of the co-defendants, described the case as "a weak case without the crucial evidential foundation a charge which grossly inflates the complainant’s loss, a complainant which is corrupt yet powerful, evidence of investigators who appear to be too close to the complainant, a long history of attacks on the accused evidence of a lack of independence of the judge”. Ameropa said the verdict is unenforceable outside of Russia and has appealed the case to the European Court of Human Rights.

In February 2024, Zivy was named on Russia's wanted list.

== Memberships ==
Zivy is a member of the board of the Swiss Democracy Foundation, whose aim it is to defend, promote and develop Democracy in Switzerland and abroad. He is a member of the Free Democratic Party of Switzerland.

== Personal life ==
Zivy is married, has three children, and lives with his wife in Binningen near Basel.
