= Michel M. Liès =

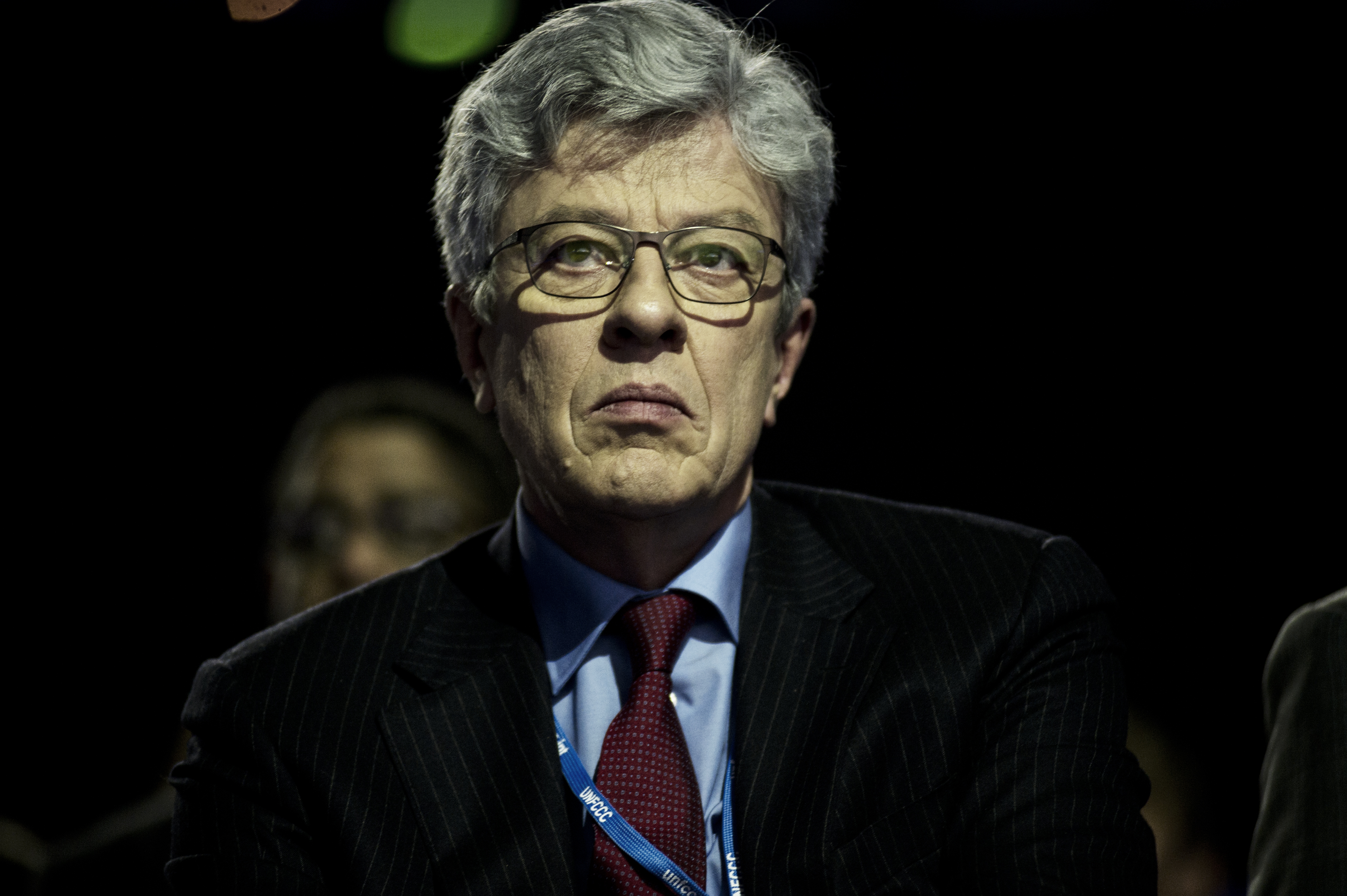
- Liès in 2015
- Born: 1954 (age 71–72); Luxembourg
- Occupation: Businessman
- Known for: Former CEO of Swiss Re

Michel M. Liès (born 1954) is a Luxembourgish businessman in the insurance sector. He was chief executive officer (CEO) of Swiss Re from February 2012 to June 2016. Since April 2018, he has been chairman of Zurich Insurance Group.

== Early life and education ==
Liès was born in 1954 in Luxembourg.

In 1974 Liès earned a degree in mathematics from the Swiss Federal Institute of Technology in Zurich, Switzerland.

== Career ==
Together with his wife he then journeyed to Brazil, where he worked in São Paulo and Mogi Guaçu as chief financial officer of a ceramics company. He joined Swiss Re in 1978, focusing on Latin American Life & Health markets. In 1994 Liès was named head of Swiss Re Ibéria & Latin America Property & Casualty. By 1998 he was a member of the company's executive board and head of the Latin America Division. From 2000 to 2005 he led Swiss Re's Europe Division, upon which time he became global Head of Client Markets and member of the executive committee.

In the fall of 2010 he was named chairman of Global Partnerships. Global Partnership engages public sector entities, governments, international development institutions and NGOs around the world to jointly find solutions for global risks. In January 2012 the announcement of his new role as group CEO of Swiss Re came. As of February 2012, he is group chief executive officer.

Since April 2018, he has been chairman of Zurich Insurance Group.
