= Kurt Hamann =

German businessman, chairman of the Victoria Insurance Company (1898-1981)

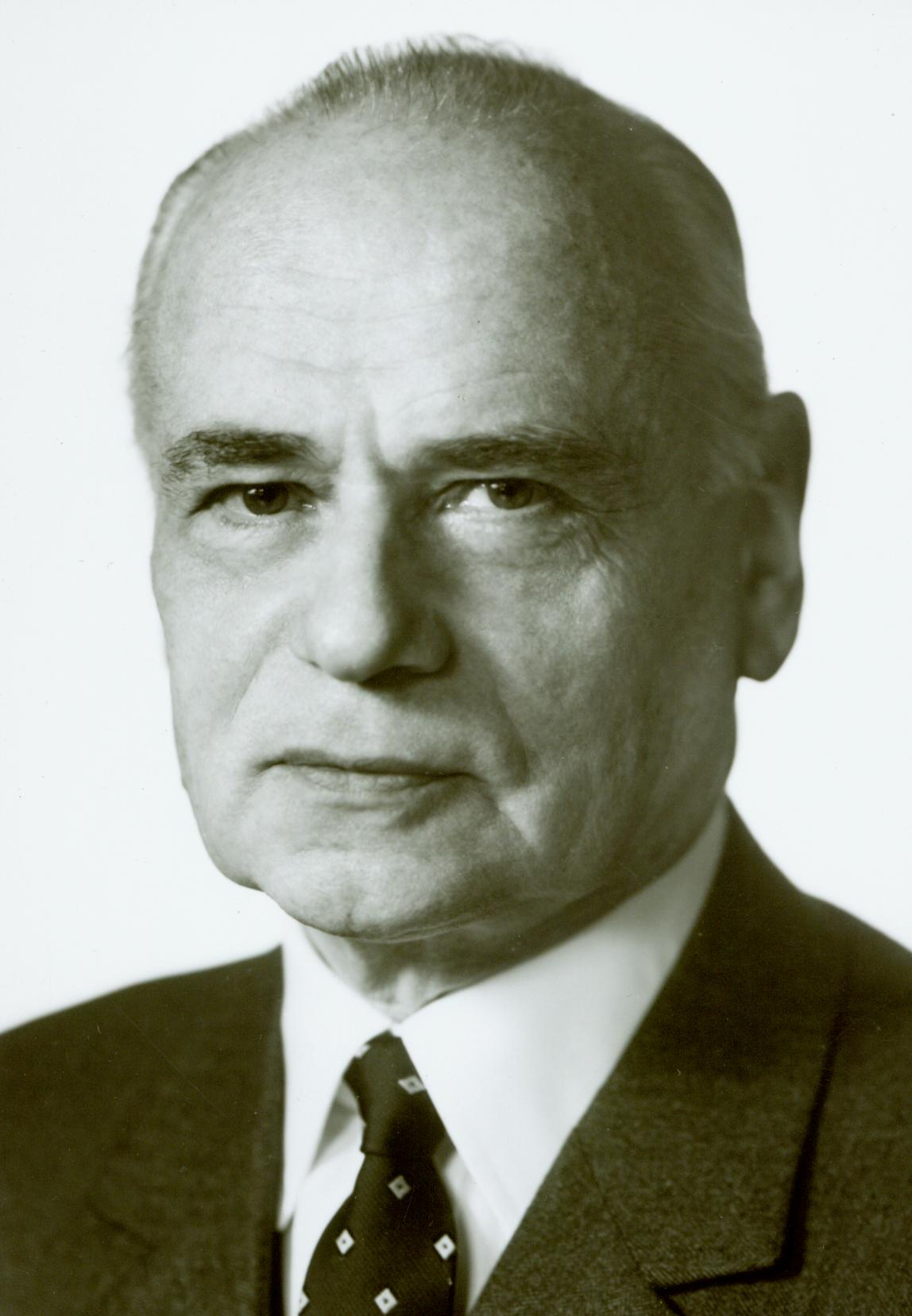
- Kurt Hamann
- Born: 26 September 1898
- Died: 13 October 1981 (aged 83)
- Education: Doctorate in law
- Occupation: German businessman

Kurt Hamann (born 26 September 1898 in Berlin; died 13 October 1981) was a German businessman who, as chairman of the Victorian Insurance Company, foreclosed on Jewish homes and covered slave labor factories. Honors bestowed upon Hamann were revoked in 2008 after information about his Nazi-era activities emerged.

== Life ==
Hamann had a doctorate in law and a district judge. D.

He initially worked in the Reich Ministry of Economics and in export credit insurance until he switched to Victoria Insurance in 1932.

As general director (since 1935) he was chairman of the board of directors of Victoria zu Berlin Allgemeine Versicherungs AG, Victoria Feuer-Versicherungs-AG and Victoria Rückversicherungs AG, all Berlin. Hamann was also a member of various supervisory boards.

Hamann was CEO of Victoria Insurance from 1935 to 1968.

After the war, however, Hamann received numerous honors from the Germany government. Hamann was twice awarded the Federal Cross of Merit and was also an Honorary Senator of the University of Mannheim.

Kurt Hamann died in 1981 at the age of 83. His grave is in the St.-Annen-Kirchhof in Berlin-Dahlem.

== Posthumous Revelations ==
=== Nazi Aryanization of Jewish properties ===
Hamann's role in aryanizing the Jewish business at Krausenstrasse 17/18, during the Nazi era was revealed in the investigative memoir, Stolen Legacy : Nazi Theft and the Quest for Justice at Krausenstrasse 17/18, Berlin which tapped into previously unavailable archives. While not officially a member of the Nazi party, Hamann was listed in Who's Who in Nazi Germany published by the British War Office in 1944. As the CEO of Victoria Insurance Company during and after the Nazi era, the investigation into Victoria shed light on activities that Hamann had been able to conceal during his life.

In the Los Angeles Review of Books review of Stolen Legacy in 2016, "Reclaiming What Was Lost" Daniel Slifkin described the role of the Victoria Insurance Company and its CEO in aryanization (theft from Jews and transfer to non-Jews by the Nazis):

The building had a mortgage on it, held by the Victoria Insurance Company. By 1936, like essentially all large German companies, the Victoria was run by someone with demonstrably close ties to the Nazi party — Dr. Kurt Hamann. And in November 1936, the Victoria suddenly foreclosed on the mortgage, demanding immediate payment, and requiring a forced auction of the property. The building was then bought by the Nazi-run national railroad, which was expanding as Germany geared up for war, and which had “bought” the neighboring building through an identical forced auction process. The evidence was pretty clear that the foreclosure was pretextual, and that the price paid was grossly inadequate. Indeed, after World War II, when the East German state took over the building in 1949 it noted in the land registry: “the Jewish owner was forced by the prevailing political circumstances to sell the property.” And the monies that remained after the mortgage was paid off were not available to the Wolff family in any real sense — the only person paid anything, Fritz Wolff, was murdered in Auschwitz a few years later.

=== Ties with Nazi war criminals ===
During the Nazi era, Hamann served on the honorary committee of the House of German Art in Munich, which glorified what Adolf Hitler considered to be Aryan art. Hamann was also on the working committee that rewrote insurance legislation in Nazi terms at the Academy of German Law, which was directed by Hans Frank, who was later executed by the Allies for war crimes.

=== Holocaust related lawsuits ===
Several lawsuits were filed against Victoria Insurance Company and its acquirer or successor organisation ERGO, including one by the family of a former executive and co-founder of Victoria, Heinrich Stahl, who was Jewish and perished in a Nazi concentration camp. During litigation, Munich Re, which was closely linked to Victoria Insurance Group, promised to open Nazi-era and postwar archives which had been closed.

In 2000, New York state regulators accused Victoria Insurance failing to pay off insurance policies that it had issued on Holocaust victims.

=== The University of Mannheim ===
On 24 December 2018, the University of Mannheim, which had awarded the Kurt Hamann Prize, announced that the Kurt Hamann Foundation would change its name, writing:

...it has became [sic] clear that, under Hamann's chairmanship, the Victoria demonstrably took many properties from Jewish owners.

== Awards ==
- 1953 – Großes Bundesverdienstkreuz
- 1978 – Großes Bundesverdienstkreuz mit Stern

Dr. Kurt-Hamann-Stiftung

== Publications ==
- Erzwingung von Zuzahlungen auf Aktien eines notleidenden Unternehmens. Marburg 1926 (zugleich juristische Dissertation)
- Hundert Jahre Viktoria Versicherungen: 1853–1953. Berlin 1953. Bei google.books
- Stolen Legacy: Nazi Legacy and the Quest for Justice.

== See also ==
- Ergo Group
- Insurance Industry
- The Holocaust in Germany
