= Binningen, Switzerland =

Binningen
- Municipality
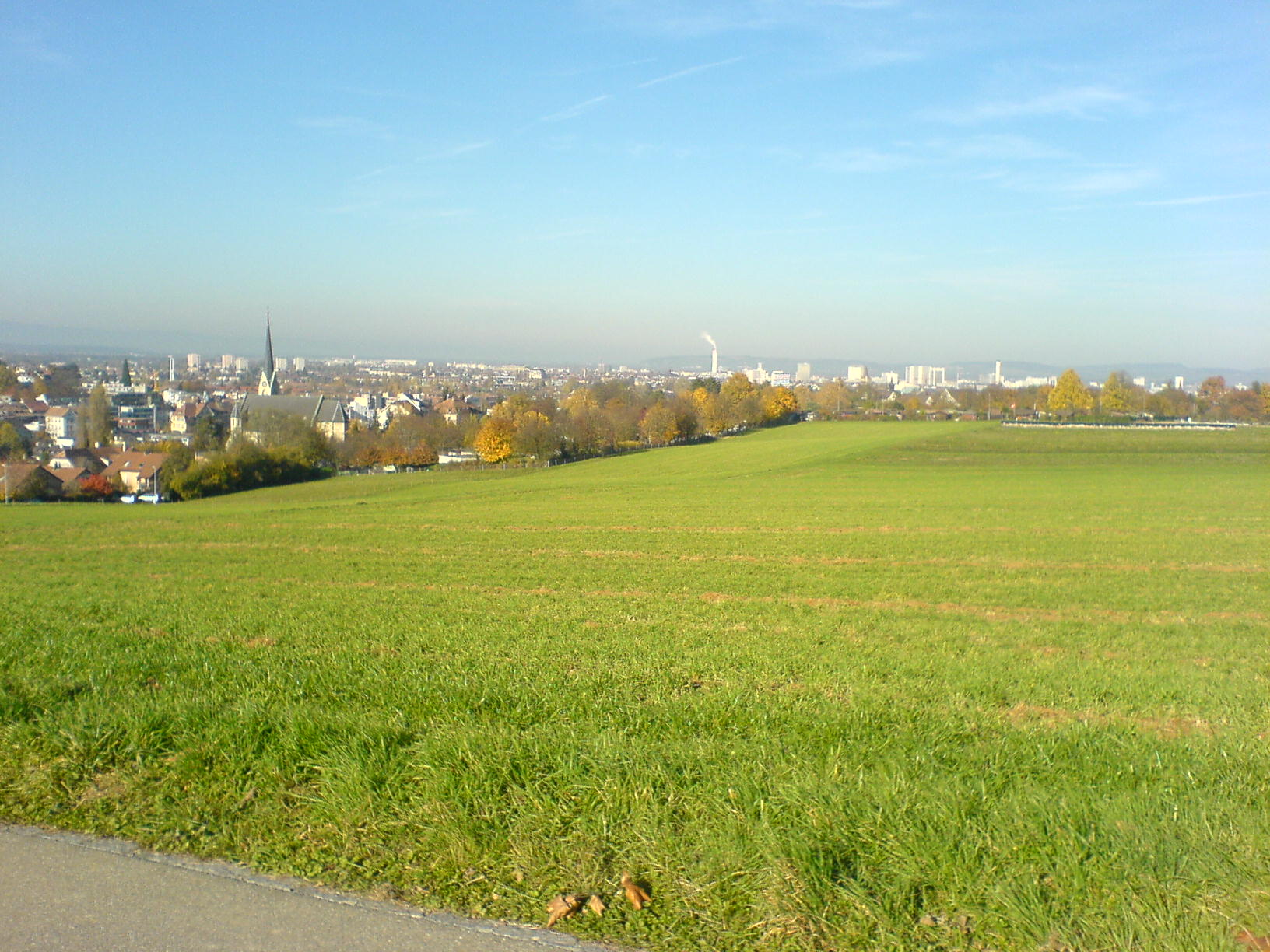

- Flag Coat of arms
- Location of Binningen
- Location within Switzerland Location within Canton of Basel-Landschaft
- Coordinates: 47°32′N 7°34′E
- Country: Switzerland
- Canton: Basel-Landschaft
- District: Arlesheim

Area
  - Total: 4.43 km^{2} (1.71 sq mi)
- Elevation: 292 m (958 ft)

Population (December 2008)
  - Total: 15,750
  - Density: 3,560/km^{2} (9,210/sq mi)
- Time zone: UTC+01:00 (CET)
  - Summer (DST): UTC+02:00 (CEST)
- Postal code: 4102
- SFOS number: 2765
- ISO 3166 code: CH-BL
- Surrounded by: Allschwil, Basel (BS), Bottmingen, Oberwil
- Website: binningen.ch

Binningen (Swiss German: Binnige) is a municipality in the district of Arlesheim in the canton of Canton of Basel-Landschaft in Switzerland. It is nestled in a valley, on a plateau, and on two hills overlooking the city of Basel.

== History ==
Binningen is first mentioned in 1004 as Binningen. Various versions of the name Binningen appear in records dating from between the eleventh and fourteenth centuries, such as "Binnengin" and "Biningin".

== Geography ==
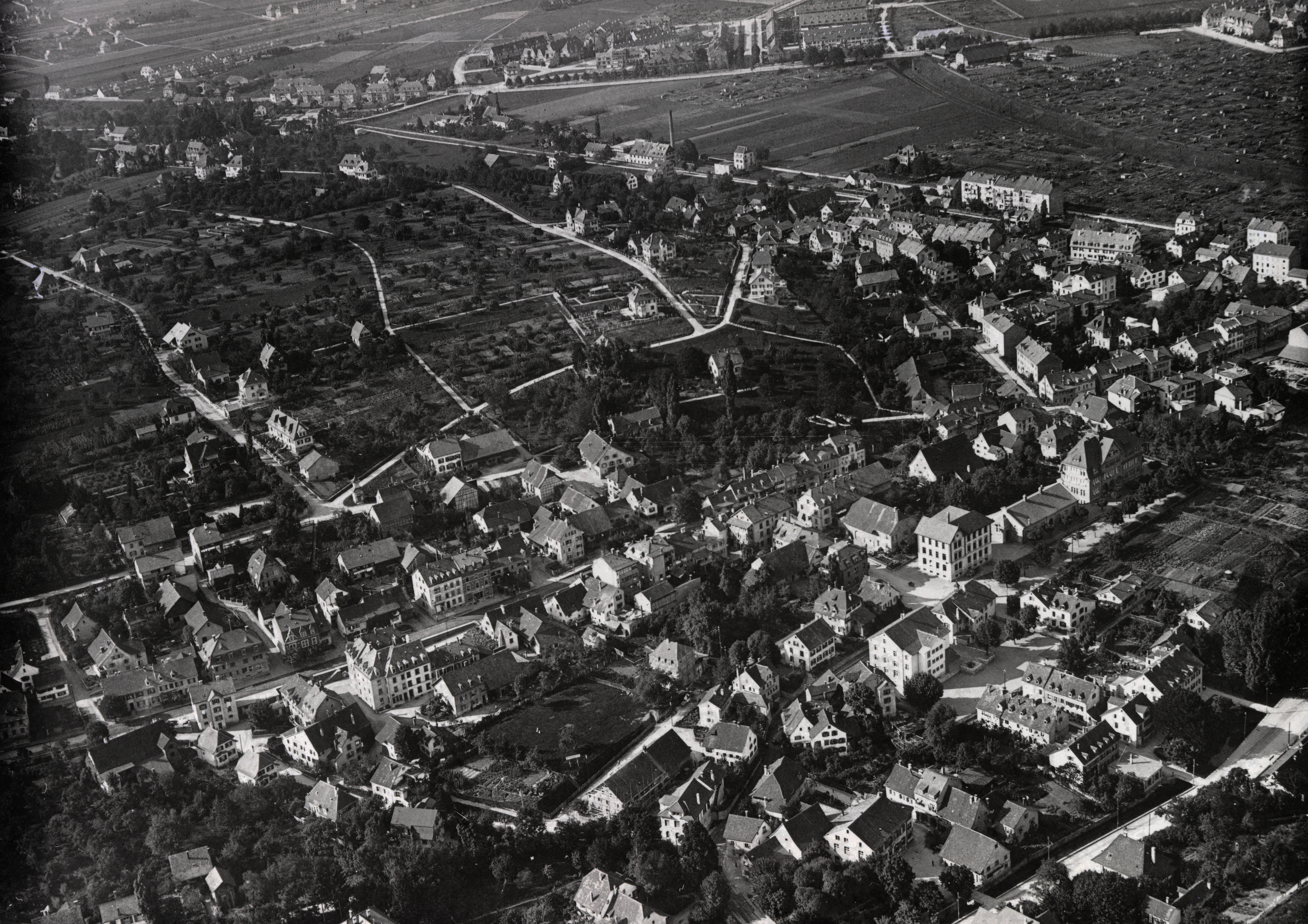
Aerial view from 300 m by Walter Mittelholzer (1925)

Binningen has an area, as of 2009, of 4.43 square kilometers (1.71 sq mi). Of this area, 0.93 km^{2} (0.36 sq mi) or 21.0% is used for agricultural purposes, while 0.31 km^{2} (0.12 sq mi) or 7.0% is forested. Of the rest of the land, 3.19 km^{2} (1.23 sq mi) or 72.0% is settled (buildings or roads) and 0.02 km^{2} (4.9 acres) or 0.5% is unproductive land.

Of the built up area, industrial buildings made up 1.1% of the total area while housing and buildings made up 53.7% and transportation infrastructure made up 9.5%. while parks, green belts and sports fields made up 7.2%. Out of the forested land, 5.9% of the total land area is heavily forested and 1.1% is covered with orchards or small clusters of trees. Of the agricultural land, 14.7% is used for growing crops and 4.3% is pastures, while 2.0% is used for orchards or vine crops.

The municipality is located in the Arlesheim district, along the Birsig river. Bottmingen was part of Binningen until 1837. Over the course of the 19th Century it has been absorbed by the agglomeration of Basel.

== Coat of arms ==
The blazon of the municipal coat of arms is Argent a sable pale, charged with three six-rayed argent mullets Said to be on a "silver backdrop with a black arrow and three silver stars".

The municipality banner is confirmed to be from the time period between 1292 and 1300. Back then, the banner was the family banner of the family "von Binningen" from Basel. Binningen's coat of arms has been slightly changed through the centuries. The coat of arms, as it appears today, dates back to 1921.

== Demographics ==
Binningen has a population (as of June 2021) of 15,750. As of 2008, 20.4% of the population are resident foreign nationals. Over the last 10 years (1997–2007) the population has changed at a rate of 2.1%.

Most of the population (as of 2000) speaks German (11,709 or 83.8%), with Italian language being second most common (517 or 3.7%) and French being third (378 or 2.7%). There are 22 people who speak Romansh.

As of 2008, the gender distribution of the population was 48.2% male and 51.8% female. The population was made up of 11,627 Swiss citizens (78.8% of the population), and 3,136 non-Swiss residents (21.2%) Of the population in the municipality 2,609 or about 18.7% were born in Binningen and lived there in 2000. There were 1,496 or 10.7% who were born in the same canton, while 5,897 or 42.2% were born somewhere else in Switzerland, and 3,486 or 24.9% were born outside of Switzerland.

In 2008 there were 101 live births to Swiss citizens and 31 births to non-Swiss citizens, and in same time span there were 119 deaths of Swiss citizens and 5 non-Swiss citizen deaths. Ignoring immigration and emigration, the population of Swiss citizens decreased by 18 while the foreign population increased by 26. There were 3 Swiss men and 9 Swiss women who emigrated from Switzerland. At the same time, there were 87 non-Swiss men and 67 non-Swiss women who immigrated from another country to Switzerland. The total Swiss population change in 2008 (from all sources, including moves across municipal borders) was an increase of 71 and the non-Swiss population change was an increase of 120 people. This represents a population growth rate of 1.3%.

The age distribution, as of 2010, in Binningen is; 934 children or 6.3% of the population are between 0 and 6 years old and 1,602 teenagers or 10.9% are between 7 and 19. Of the adult population, 1,529 people or 10.4% of the population are between 20 and 29 years old. 2,006 people or 13.6% are between 30 and 39, 2,434 people or 16.5% are between 40 and 49, and 2,815 people or 19.1% are between 50 and 64. The senior population distribution is 2,503 people or 17.0% of the population are between 65 and 79 years old and there are 940 people or 6.4% who are over 80.

As of 2000, there were 5,206 people who were single and never married in the municipality. There were 6,860 married individuals, 967 widows or widowers and 944 individuals who are divorced.

As of 2000, there were 6,829 private households in the municipality, and an average of 2. persons per household. There were 2,751 households that consist of only one person and 215 households with five or more people. Out of a total of 6,931 households that answered this question, 39.7% were households made up of just one person and 46 were adults who lived with their parents. Of the rest of the households, there are 2,145 married couples without children, 1,431 married couples with children There were 354 single parents with a child or children. There were 102 households that were made up unrelated people and 102 households that were made some sort of institution or another collective housing.

In 2000 there were 1,570 single family homes (or 59.2% of the total) out of a total of 2,652 inhabited buildings. There were 716 multi-family buildings (27.0%), along with 268 multi-purpose buildings that were mostly used for housing (10.1%) and 98 other use buildings (commercial or industrial) that also had some housing (3.7%). Of the single family homes 120 were built before 1919, while 95 were built between 1990 and 2000. The greatest number of single family homes (336) were built between 1946 and 1960.

In 2000 there were 7,364 apartments in the municipality. The most common apartment size was 3 rooms of which there were 2,455. There were 323 single room apartments and 1,926 apartments with five or more rooms. Of these apartments, a total of 6,687 apartments (90.8% of the total) were permanently occupied, while 542 apartments (7.4%) were seasonally occupied and 135 apartments (1.8%) were empty. As of 2007, the construction rate of new housing units was 4.3 new units per 1000 residents. As of 2000 the average price to rent a two-room apartment was about 845.00 CHF (US$680, £380, €540), a three-room apartment was about 1049.00 CHF (US$840, £470, €670) and a four-room apartment cost an average of 1361.00 CHF (US$1090, £610, €870). The vacancy rate for the municipality, in 2008, was 0.36%.

The historical population is given in the following chart:

== Sights ==
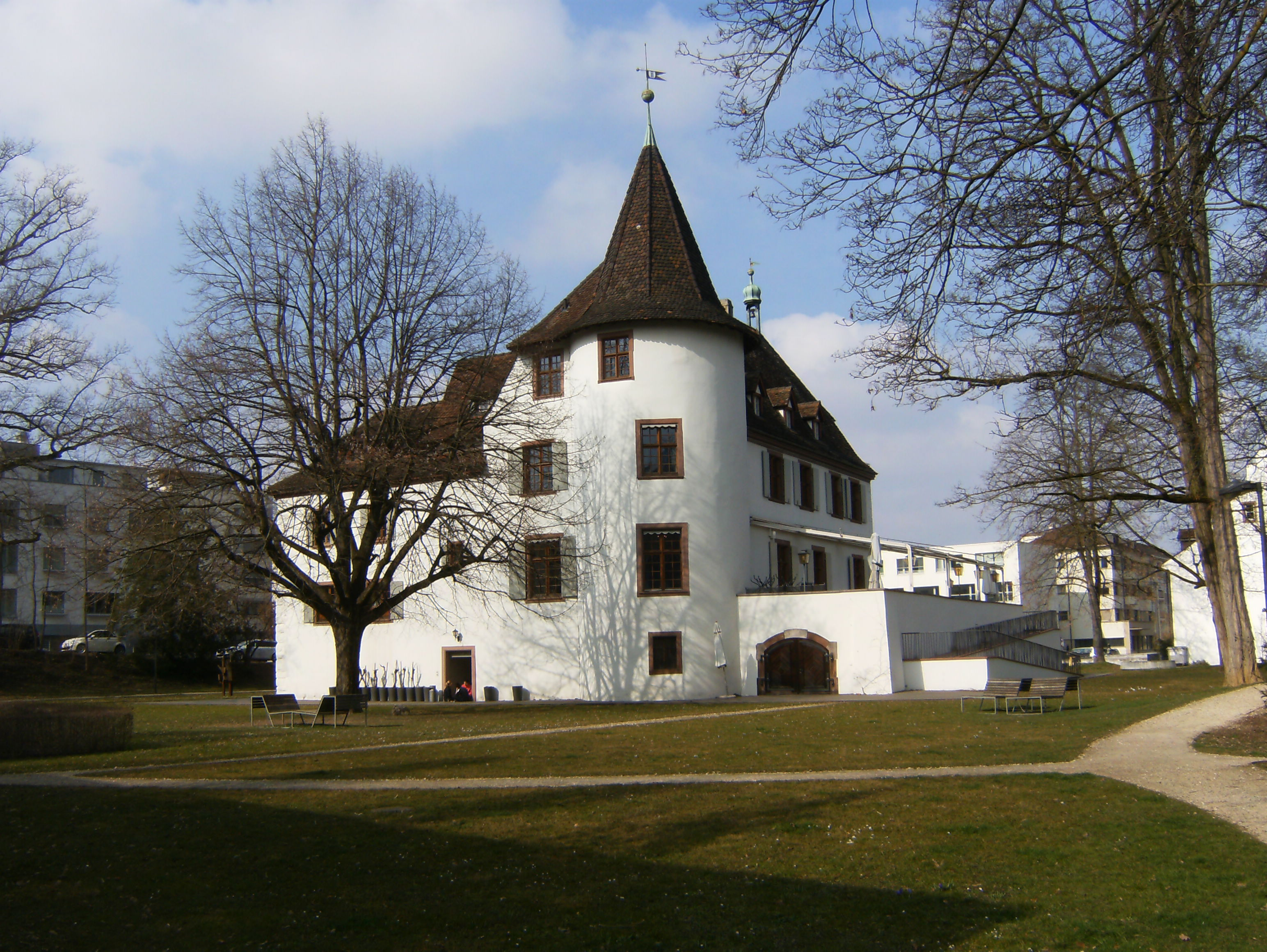
Binningen Castle

Monteverdi Automuseum

- Allschwiler forest: nature reserve on the Western end of Binningen
- Astronomy observatory from the University of Basel
- Binningen Castle: former lake castle, which was built in the 13th century and belongs now to the municipality of Binningen. Since 1870 it has had a restaurant, and since 2007 an adjacent hotel.
- Catholic church
- Holee castle from 1550: is now in private ownership
- Ice-skating station, St. Margarethen
- Monteverdi Car Collection: the largest Swiss car museum
- Neubad Inn: former wellness bath built in 1765 around natural springs
- Sunbath St. Margarethen (Sonnenbad)
- St. Margarethen: church on the Margarethen hill
- Ortsmuseum (town museum)
- Zoo Basel (some non-public-access area is on Binningen ground), the zoo's South entrance lies just outside Binningen's border

== Politics ==
In the 2007 federal election the most popular party was the SP which received 27.44% of the vote. The next three most popular parties were the SVP (23.72%), the FDP (20.63%) and the Green Party (13.05%). In the federal election, a total of 5,240 votes were cast, and the voter turnout was 52.7%.

== Economy ==
As of 2007, Binningen had an unemployment rate of 2.48%. As of 2005, there were 51 people employed in the primary economic sector and about 10 businesses involved in this sector. 767 people were employed in the secondary sector and there were 79 businesses in this sector. 4,360 people were employed in the tertiary sector, with 461 businesses in this sector. There were 6,997 residents of the municipality who were employed in some capacity, of which females made up 45.6% of the workforce.

In 2008, the total number of full-time equivalent jobs was 4,115. The number of jobs in the primary sector was 14, all of which were in agriculture. The number of jobs in the secondary sector was 549, of which 127 or (23.1%) were in manufacturing and 422 (76.9%) were in construction. The number of jobs in the tertiary sector was 3,552. In the tertiary sector; 400 or 11.3% were in wholesale or retail sales or the repair of motor vehicles, 59 or 1.7% were in the movement and storage of goods, 117 or 3.3% were in a hotel or restaurant, 23 or 0.6% were in the information industry, 276 or 7.8% were the insurance or financial industry, 258 or 7.3% were technical professionals or scientists, 140 or 3.9% were in education and 1,738 or 48.9% were in health care.

In 2000, there were 4,299 workers who commuted into the municipality and 5,541 workers who commuted away. The municipality is a net exporter of workers, with about 1.3 workers leaving the municipality for every one entering. About 12.0% of the workforce coming into Binningen are coming from outside Switzerland, while 0.3% of the locals commute out of Switzerland for work. Of the working population, 38.2% used public transportation to get to work, and 30.6% used a private car.

== Religion ==
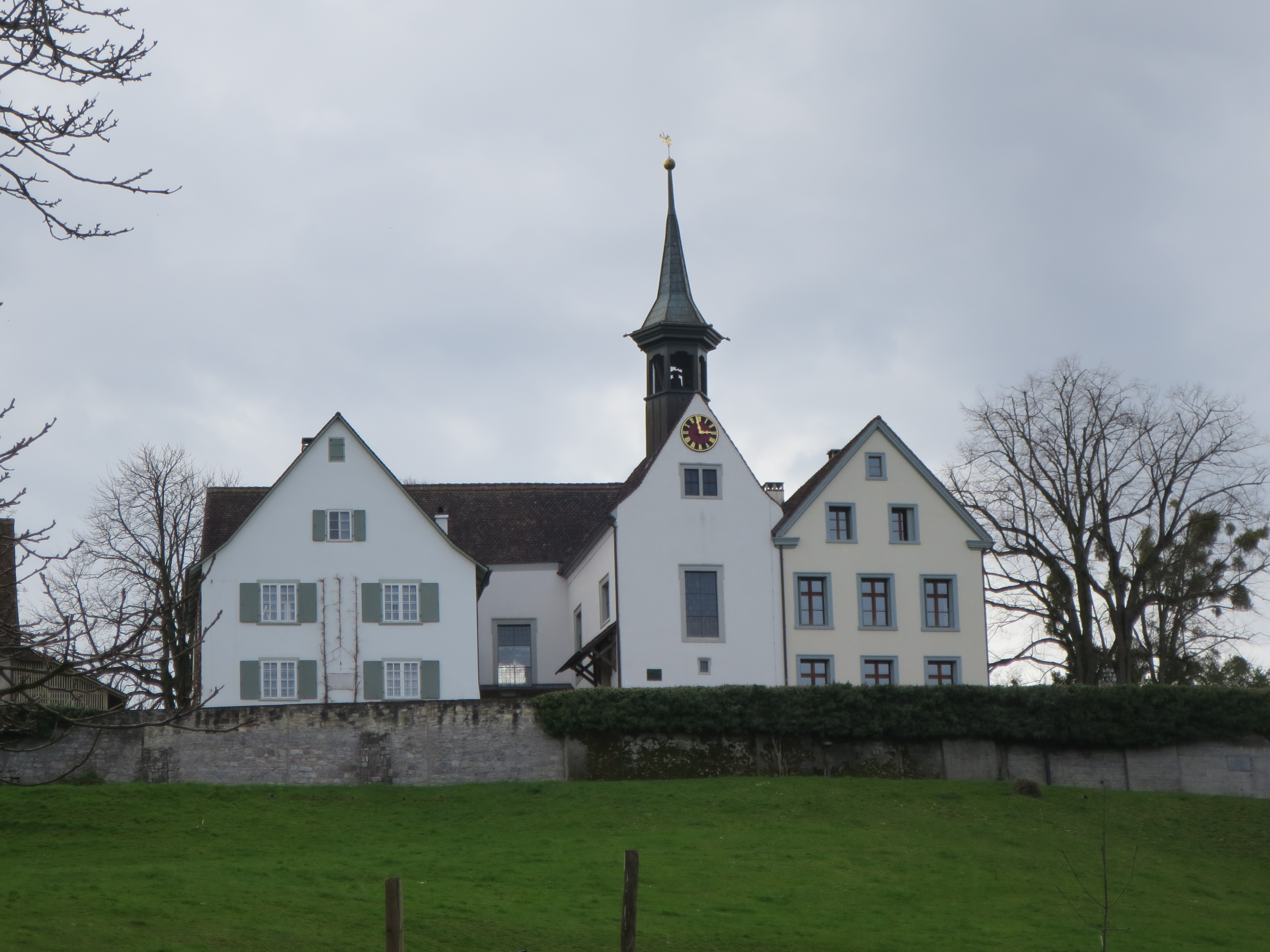
St. Margarethen Church

From the 2000 census, 4,136 or 29.6% were Roman Catholic, while 5,230 or 37.4% belonged to the Swiss Reformed Church. Of the rest of the population, there were 205 members of an Orthodox church (or about 1.47% of the population), there were 39 individuals (or about 0.28% of the population) who belonged to the Christian Catholic Church, and there were 272 individuals (or about 1.95% of the population) who belonged to another Christian church. There were 78 individuals (or about 0.56% of the population) who were Jewish, and 439 (or about 3.14% of the population) who were Islamic. There were 48 individuals who were Buddhist, 112 individuals who were Hindu and 13 individuals who belonged to another church. 2,855 (or about 20.43% of the population) belonged to no church, are agnostic or atheist, and 550 individuals (or about 3.94% of the population) did not answer the question.

== Education ==
In Binningen about 5,523 or (39.5%) of the population have completed non-mandatory upper secondary education, and 3,031 or (21.7%) have completed additional higher education (either university or a Fachhochschule). Of the 3,031 who completed tertiary schooling, 53.8% were Swiss men, 28.1% were Swiss women, 10.5% were non-Swiss men and 7.7% were non-Swiss women. As of 2000, there were 206 students in Binningen who came from another municipality, while 643 residents attended schools outside the municipality.

Binningen is home to 2 libraries. These libraries include; the Astronomical Institute (German: Astronomisches Institut) and the Municipal Library (German: Gemeindebibliothek). There was a combined total (as of 2008) of 23,251 books or other media in the libraries, and in the same year a total of 62,576 items were loaned out.

== Weather ==
Climate data for Basel/Binningen
Month	Jan	Feb	Mar	Apr	May	Jun	Jul	Aug	Sep	Oct	Nov	Dec	Year
Mean daily maximum °C (°F)	3.6 (38.5)	5.8 (42.4)	9.9 (49.8)	14 (57)	18.4 (65.1)	21.7 (71.1)	24.2 (75.6)	23.5 (74.3)	20.3 (68.5)	14.8 (58.6)	8.3 (46.9)	4.5 (40.1)	14.1 (57.4)
Daily mean °C (°F)	0.9 (33.6)	2.4 (36.3)	5.6 (42.1)	9.1 (48.4)	13.1 (55.6)	16.3 (61.3)	18.5 (65.3)	17.7 (63.9)	14.8 (58.6)	10.1 (50.2)	4.9 (40.8)	1.8 (35.2)	9.6 (49.3)
Mean daily minimum °C (°F)	−1.9 (28.6)	−0.7 (30.7)	1.7 (35.1)	4.4 (39.9)	8.1 (46.6)	11.1 (52.0)	13 (55)	12.8 (55.0)	10.4 (50.7)	6.6 (43.9)	2 (36)	−0.8 (30.6)	5.6 (42.1)
Average precipitation mm (inches)	51 (2.0)	49 (1.9)	51 (2.0)	64 (2.5)	84 (3.3)	87 (3.4)	79 (3.1)	87 (3.4)	62 (2.4)	51 (2.0)	59 (2.3)	54 (2.1)	778 (30.6)
Average precipitation days	10.1	9.4	10.8	11.3	12.6	10.9	9.5	10.3	8.3	8.4	10	9.8	121.4
Source: MeteoSchweiz

== Sport ==
SC Binningen is the municipality's football club.

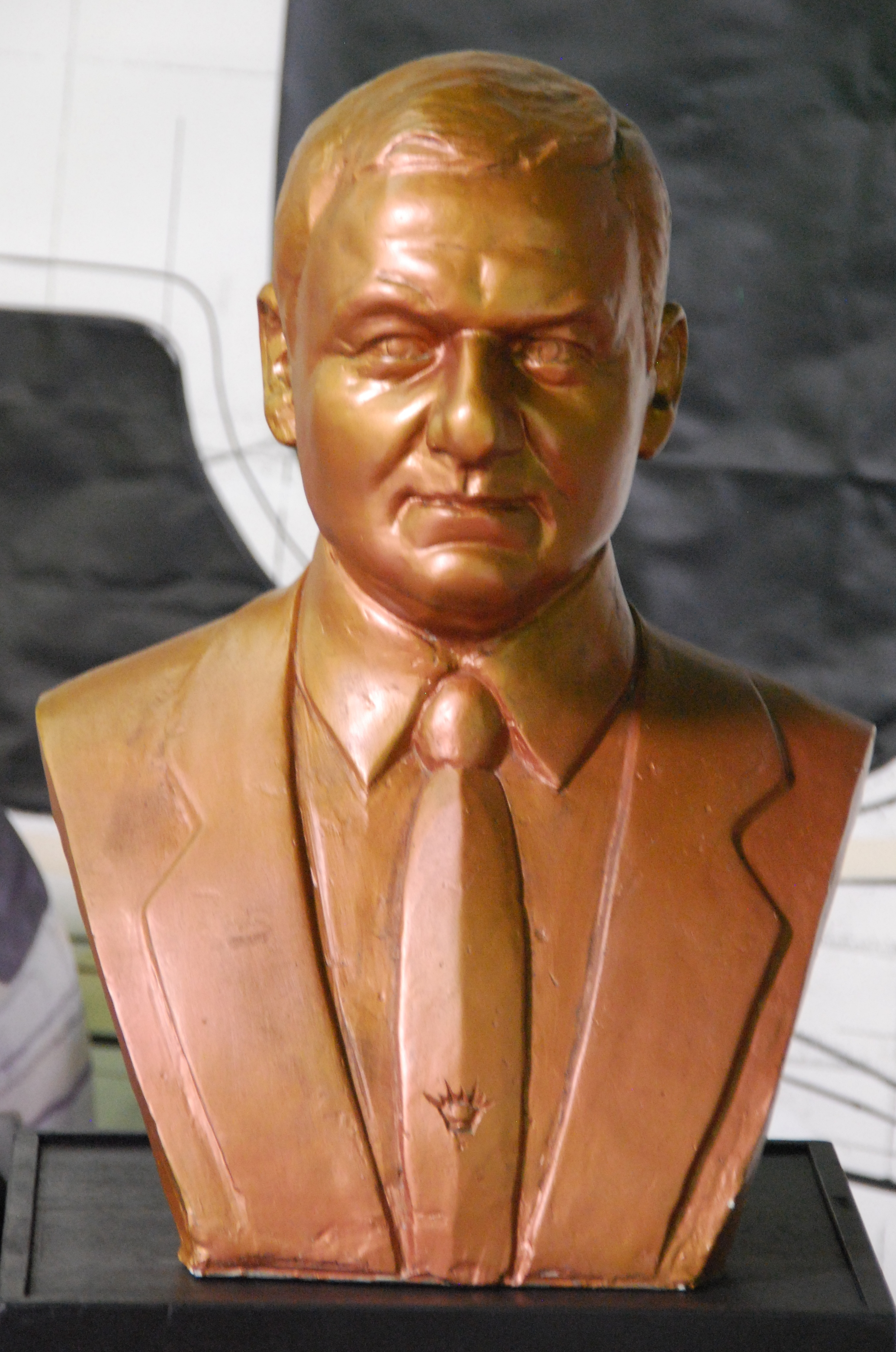
Peter Monteverdi, 2011

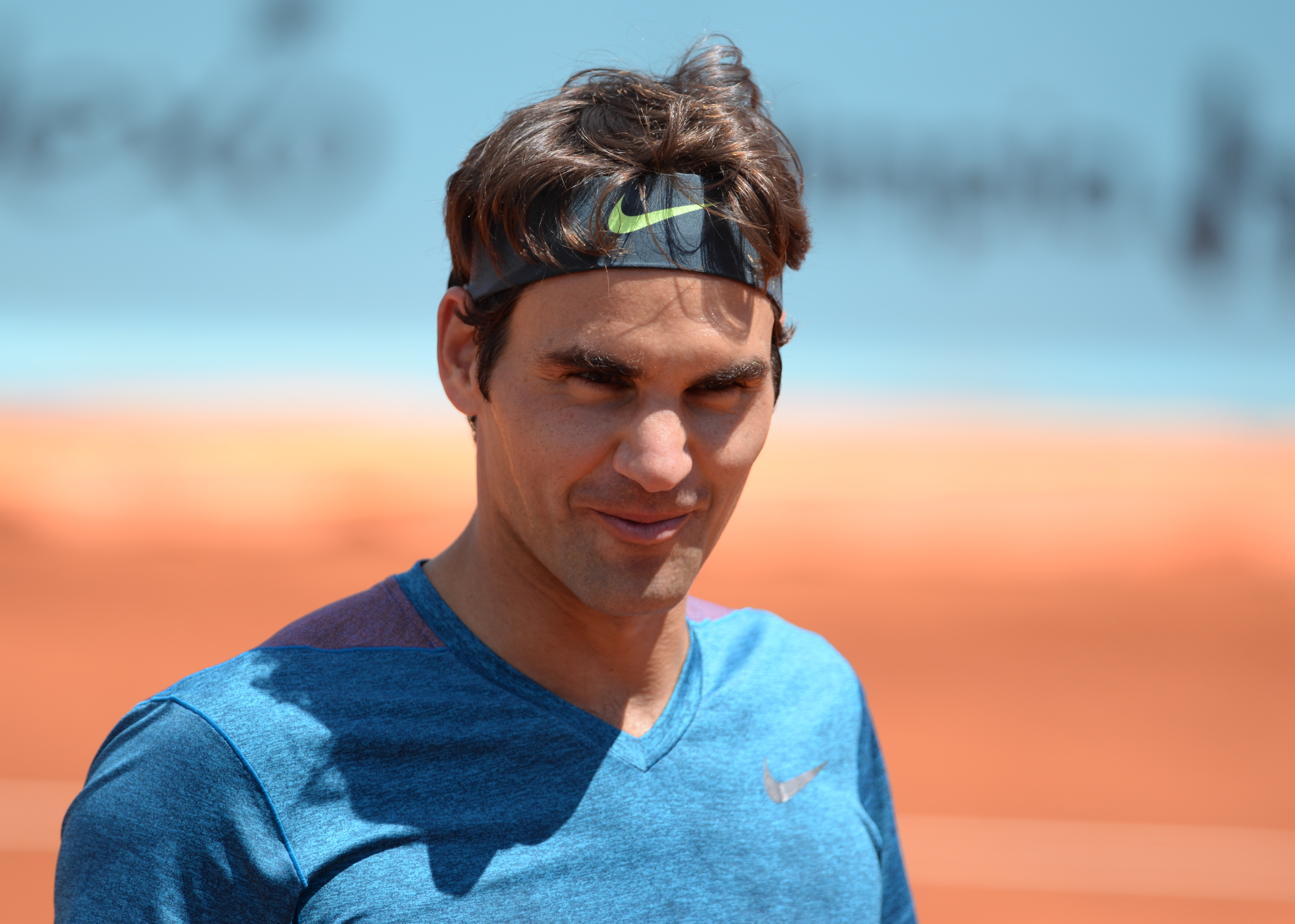
Roger Federer, 2009

== Notable people ==
- Curt Goetz (1888–1960), actor, author, screenwriter; and Hollywood film director; spent early youth in Binningen and called his autobiography „Die Memoiren des Peterhans von Binningen“ (Peterhans's Memories from Binningen)
- Otto Abt (1903 in Binningen – 1982) a Swiss painter.
- Ruedi Walter (1916–1990 in Binningen), comedian and actor
- Kurt Baldinger (1919 in Binningen – 2007) a Swiss linguist and philologist
- Peter-Lukas Graf (1929–2025 in Binningen), flautist
- Peter Monteverdi (1934 in Binningen – 1998) Swiss carmaker and creator of the car brand Monteverdi
- Hans Fünfschilling (born 1940) politician, Basel-Country senator 1999–2007
- Claude Janiak (born 1948), lawyer in Binningen since 1978, politician and president of the Swiss National Council 2005/2006
- Martin Senn (1954 in Binningen – 2016) a Swiss insurance manager, CEO of the Zurich Insurance Group 2010-2015
- Andreas Zivy (born 1955 in Binningen) a Swiss businessman, lives in Binningen
- Krystian Zimerman (born 1956) a Polish pianist and conductor, lives in Binningen

Sport

- Oumar Kondé (born 1979 in Binningen) a former Swiss footballer, over 200 club caps
- Roger Federer (born 1981) Swiss professional tennis player, born in Binningen Cantonal Hospital
- Noah Okafor (born 2000 in Binningen) a Swiss footballer
