= Peter Monteverdi =

Swiss engineer (1934–1999)

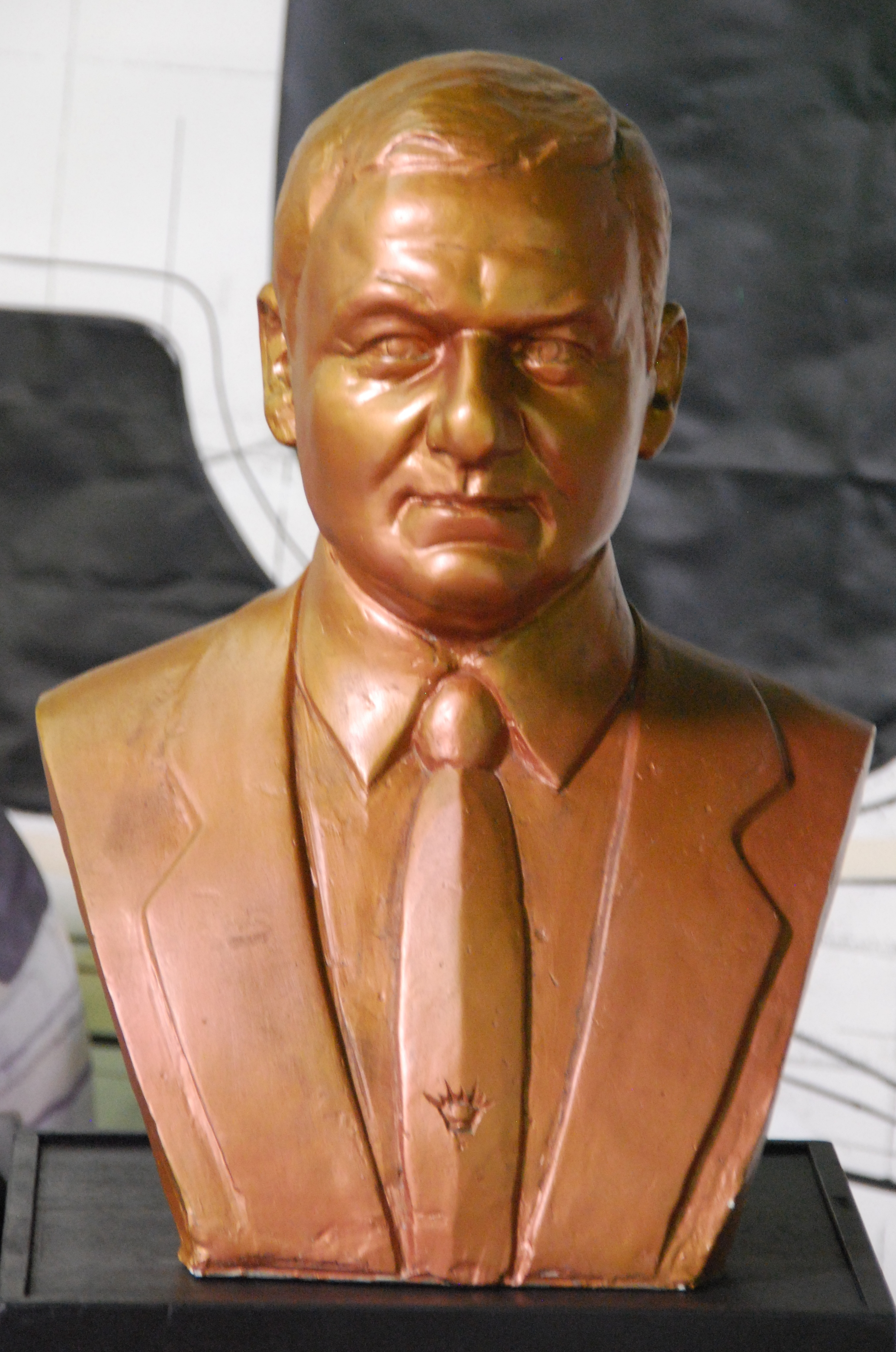
- Born: 7 June 1934; Binningen, Switzerland
- Died: 4 July 1998 (aged 64); Binningen, Switzerland

Formula One World Championship career
- Nationality: (Switzerland) Swiss
- Active years: 1961
- Team: MBM
- Entries: 1 (0 starts)
- Championships: 0
- Wins: 0
- Podiums: 0
- Career points: 0
- Pole positions: 0
- Fastest laps: 0
- First entry: 1961 German Grand Prix

Peter Monteverdi (7 June 1934 – 4 July 1998) was a Swiss carmaker and creator of the car brand Monteverdi.

At the beginning of his career, Monteverdi was a car salesman. His father ran a garage and truck business, which Peter used as his initial inspiration. He built his Monteverdi Special in 1952 using the remains of a wrecked 1949 Fiat. It is now on display at the Swiss Transport Museum in Lucerne. In 1957 he acquired the Swiss franchise for Ferrari, subsequently becoming Swiss importer for other international prestige brands including Rolls-Royce and Bentley. In 1952, he started producing cars under his own name.

== Formula One involvement ==
Peter Monteverdi was born in Binningen, in the northern Swiss canton of Basel-Landschaft. He engaged in the construction of Formula One cars from the late 1950s to the early 1960s. In 1961, he built the first Swiss Formula One car, which bore the name MBM (Monteverdi Basel Motoren). He made a single Formula One appearance at the 1961 Solitude Grand Prix, where he retired after two laps, and subsequently withdrew his entry for the German Grand Prix having been injured in a prior race. He subsequently retired from race driving.

In 1989 Monteverdi bought the Onyx Formula One team after its original backer ran into financial difficulties. The team's best result was when Stefan Johansson finished in third place at the 1989 Portuguese Grand Prix. However, the involvement proved unsustainable and was terminated during the following season. A legacy was the Monteverdi Hai 650 F1 sportscar, of which supposedly six copies were sold until 1994.

== Death ==
Monteverdi died from cancer on 4 July 1998 in Binningen, in his apartment directly above his own car-assembly workshop. He was 64.

== Complete Formula One World Championship results ==
(key)

Year	Entrant	Chassis	Engine	1	2	3	4	5	6	7	8	WDC	Points
1961	Piero Monteverdi	MBM	Porsche Flat-4	MON	NED	BEL	FRA	GBR	GER; WD	ITA	USA	NC	0

=== Non-championship results ===
(key)

Year	Entrant	Chassis	Engine	1	2	3	4	5	6	7	8	9	10	11	12	13	14	15	16	17	18	19	20	21
1961	Piero Monteverdi	MBM	Porsche Flat-4	LOM	GLV	PAU	BRX	VIE	AIN	SYR	NAP	LON	SIL	SOL; Ret	KAN	DAN	MOD	FLG	OUL	LEW	VAL	RAN	NAT	RSA
