= Zurich Insurance Group =

Swiss Insurance Company

Zurich Insurance Group Ltd.

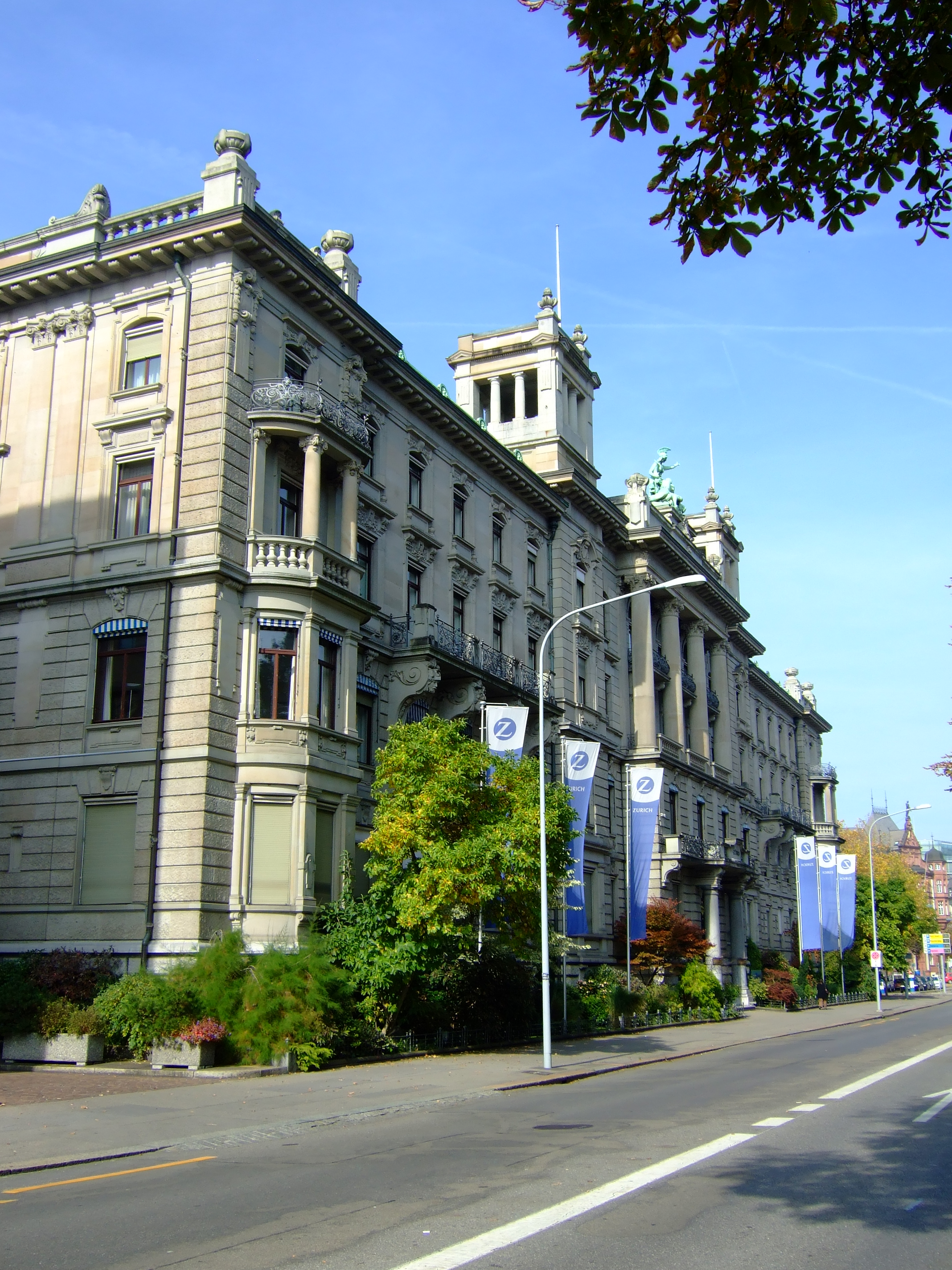
- Headquarters at Mythenquai
- Formerly: Zurich Insurance Company (1872–1998); Zurich Financial Services (1998–2012)
- Type: Public
- Traded as: SIX: ZURN; SMI component
- Industry: Financial services
- Founded: 1872; 154 years ago
- Headquarters: Zürich, Switzerland
- Key people: Michel Liès (chairman); Mario Greco (CEO)
- Services: Insurance; General insurance; Health insurance; Vehicle insurance; Travel insurance; Home insurance; Life insurance; Mortgage loans; Investment management; Asset management
- Revenue: ▲US$ 69.87 billion (2021)
- Total assets: ▼US$435.826 billion (2021)
- Total equity: ▼US$39.170 billion (2021)
- Number of employees: 56,000 (2021)
- Website: www.zurich.com

Zurich Insurance Group Ltd. is a Swiss insurance company, headquartered in Zürich, and the country's largest insurer. As of 2024, the group is the world's 98th largest public company according to Forbes' Global 2000s list, and in 2011, it ranked 94th in Interbrand's top 100 brands.

Zurich is a global insurance company which is organized into three core business segments: General Insurance, Global Life and Farmers. Zurich employs 55,000 people, with customers in 215 countries and territories. The company is listed on SIX Swiss Exchange. As of 2012, it had a shareholders' equity of $34.494 billion.

== Company history ==
=== Zurich Insurance Company (1872–1998) ===
The company was founded in 1872 as a reinsurance company under the name of "Versicherungs-Verein" and at the request of the "Schweiz" transport insurance company (which was founded in 1869 on the initiative of the "Schweizerischen Kreditanstalt"), a subsidiary of the Schweiz Marine Company. It was founded by people who were also board members of the "Schweiz" transport insurance company.

The business activity began on 1 May 1873. In 1875, accident insurance was added. The company was renamed Transport- und Unfall-Versicherungs-Actiengesellschaft "Zurich". In 1880 Zurich abandoned the marine business following a significant loss.

Throughout 1894, it acquired licenses to conduct business in Austria, Prussia, Denmark, Sweden, Norway, the rest of Germany, France, Belgium, the Netherlands, Spain, Poland, Russia, Italy, Luxembourg, and Liechtenstein. Due to the change in 1894 from transport insurance to accident and liability insurance, it was renamed "Zurich" "Allgemeine Unfall- und Haftpflicht-Versicherungs-Gesellschaft". Due to legal settlements in the area of workers' compensation, it took a risk and entered the North American market in 1912, starting in the states of New York, Illinois, New Jersey, and Massachusetts in the US.

In 1915, Zurich acquired its first whole company, "Hispania Compañia General de Seguros" of Barcelona in Spain. Ten years later, in 1922, Zurich founded "Vita Lebensversicherungs-Gesellschaft" as an independent subsidiary, which soon expanded into neighboring countries. In addition, a branch was established in the United Kingdom (the first foreign insurance company to do so). One year later, another branch was established in Canada.

In 1925, Zurich became the official insurer of all new Ford vehicles in Great Britain. The "Zurich Fire Insurance Company of New York" was founded in 1929, the reinsurance company Turegum in 1938 and the "American Guarantee and Liability Company in New York" in 1939.

In 1950, it bought a share in "Companhia de Seguros Metrópole S.A." of Lisbon. Five years later, in 1955, «Zürich» Allgemeine Unfall- und Haftpflicht-Versicherungs-Gesellschaft was renamed «Zürich» Versicherungs-Gesellschaft, a name it still holds today.

Between 1955 and 1976 several companies were acquired, including the "Commonwealth General Assurance Corporation" of Sydney, "Iguazú Compañía de Seguros S.A." from Buenos Aires, "Empire Fire and Marine Insurance Company" from Nebraska, "Fidelity and Deposit Company" from Maryland, "Universal Underwriters" from Kansas City, "Anglo Americana de Seguros Gerais" from São Paulo, "Minerva Group" from Italy, "Centre Reinsurance Holding" from Bermuda, "La Chilena Consolidada", and "Seguros de Vida" from Chile and "Seguros Chapultepec" from Mexico.

On the initiative of "Vita Lebensversicherungs-Gesellschaft", the first Vita Parcours (fitness trails) in Switzerland were created in 1968 and ZIM (Zurich Investment Management) was founded in 1990 as an investment management partner for redemption funds and institutional investors in Switzerland. As part of a new brand strategy, "Vita" became "Zurich" Life Insurance Company in 1993, operating in the market under the name "Zürich Leben". While the name "Vita" thus disappeared from the market, it lives on in the "Stiftung Vita Parcours", which was outsourced in 1994. In 1994, "Zürich" took over the Zurich private bank "Rüd, Blass & Cie." Due to refocusing on the insurance business, the private bank was sold again in 2003.

In 1996, Zurich acquired 80 percent of "Kemper Corporation" and 97 percent of "Kemper Financial Service" and in 1997 acquired a majority interest in New York-based "Scudder, Stevens & Clark". Subsequently, Kemper was merged with Scudder to form "Scudder Kemper Investments", which was later renamed "Zurich Scudder Investments". Following the September 11 attacks, on 24 September 2001, Zurich Financial announced it would sell Zurich Scudder, which then had US$370 billion in assets under management, to Deutsche Bank for US$2.5 billion (US$1.2 billion in cash and the rest in assets). The transaction was closed on 5 April 2002.

=== Zurich Financial Services (1998–2012) ===
In September 1998, Zurich and the financial division of British American Tobacco merged to form "Zurich Financial Services". This comprised the Swiss company "Zurich Allied AG", listed on the Swiss Market Index, and the British company "Allied Zurich plc", listed on the FTSE 100 (Dual-listed Company). In 2000, the structure was reorganized under a single holding company under Swiss company law. All old shares were replaced by new shares in the newly formed "Zurich Financial Services" (ZFS) with a first listing on the SIX Swiss Exchange in Zurich and a second listing in London.

In 2002, ZFS focused on insurance-related financial products and services. ZFS returned to profitability in 2003, announcing that it had met its targets and posted a profit of US$2.1 billion, compared to a loss of US$3.4 billion a year earlier. Operating income increased 93 percent to $2.3 billion, marking the turnaround. Zurich remained on track in 2004 with net income of US$2.5 billion and operating income of US$3.1 billion, an increase of 36 percent over the previous year. Zurich's net income increased by 30 percent to US$3.2 billion in 2005, and operating income rose by 32 percent to US$3.9 billion. In 2008, "Zurich Financial Services" recorded net income of US$3 billion, compared to a record US$5.7 billion in the previous year.

In July 2011, Zurich announced that it had signed definitive agreements for a long-term alliance with "Banco Santander SA" (Santander) over 25 years in Latin America.

=== Zurich Insurance Group (since 2012) ===
In April 2012, Zurich Financial Services Ltd changed back to its original name, Zurich Insurance Group Ltd. In a statement, the Group explained the rationale behind the name change. "In recognition of this strategic focus, the reference to financial services in the company name has been replaced by indicating the insurance activity of the Group instead and to specify the purpose accordingly."

In December 2015, the CEO Martin Senn announced his resignation. Despite years of highly profitable business operations, the focus was put on recent events which forced Senn to step down. Interim chairman Tom de Swaan took over as acting CEO.

In January 2016, it was announced that Zurich had hired Mario Greco, CEO of Generali as its next chief executive, and that he would start in May.

Zurich Spain launched Klinc in 2018, a Spanish digital company that offers online insurance plans for cars, life, home, devices, and micromobility led by Stefano de Liguoro, Head of Digital at Zurich Seguros. The company sprung from the multinational insurance company Zurich Seguros. In 2021, the company merged with doppo, a digital auto insurance start up. Zurich Klinc is dedicated to promoting a healthy and sustainable lifestyle. As a result, it focuses on promoting and sponsoring sporting events such as the Orbea Monegros, and the Orbea Klasika in Bilbao.

In November 2021, Zurich signed an acquisition agreement with Texas-based Special Insurance Services.

On 3 January 2022, Zurich Insurance Group announced that its Italian subsidiary, Zurich Investments Life S.p.A. had agreed to sell its life and pension back book to the Portuguese insurer and wealth management platform GamaLife – Companhia de Seguros de Vida, S.A. (GamaLife), for an undisclosed sum. Zurich said the transaction was expected to release approximately $1.2bn (£907m, €1bn) of capital.

In March 2022, following the Russian invasion of Ukraine, Zurich Insurance suspended the use of its logo containing an encircled "Z" on social media due to the association of an enclosed "Z" as support of Russian violence against Ukrainians.

In March 2026, Zurich Insurance agreed to takeover Beazley plc in a deal valued at £8.1 billion.

== Core business segments ==
=== General Insurance ===
Zurich's General Insurance business serves individuals, small and medium-sized businesses and major multinational corporations with motor, home, and commercial products and services.

=== Global Life ===
Zurich's Global Life business offers life insurance, savings, investment and pension products. In the United States life insurance is issued by Zurich American Life Insurance Company with offices in Schaumburg, Illinois; Overland Park, Kansas; and New York City.

=== Farmers ===
Zurich's Farmers Insurance segment includes Farmers Management Services, which provides non-claims related management services to the Farmers Exchanges (not owned by Zurich). Zurich also owns the Farmers RE business which includes reinsurance assumed from the Farmers Exchange by the Group. Zurich's Farmers Insurance Group is the third largest insurance group in the United States.

=== MetLife ===
In December 2020, the Zurich group purchased the property and casualty insurance segment from MetLife for US$3.6 billion. The purchase, combined with a 10-year cooperation agreement between Farmers and MetLife is financed by Zurich group with US$2.43 billion while the remaining US$1.51 billion is contributed by Farmers.

== Zurich Ireland ==
Officially known as Zurich Insurance plc ('ZIP'), Zurich Ireland is a wholly owned subsidiary. ZIP is an Irish insurance company originally incorporated in 1950 and is Zurich Insurance Group's main legal entity for writing non-life insurance business in Europe. ZIP writes non-life insurance business across the European Union through its Irish head office and network of branches.

In July 2023, it was announced that ZIP would undergo a "cross-border conversion" from a public limited company in Ireland to a Aktiengesellschaft (stock corporation) in Germany.

== Zurich North America ==
Zurich expanded into US and Canadian market in 1912 to become one of the leading commercial P&C insurance provider. It serves a diverse set of industries including automotive, agriculture, construction, manufacturing, technology and numerous others.

== Zurich Kotak General Insurance Company ==
Zurich Insurance owns 70% of Zurich Kotak General Insurance in India, headquartered in Mumbai. It offers non-life insurance products like motor, car, bike, health, travel, home insurance and others.

== Financial performance and information ==
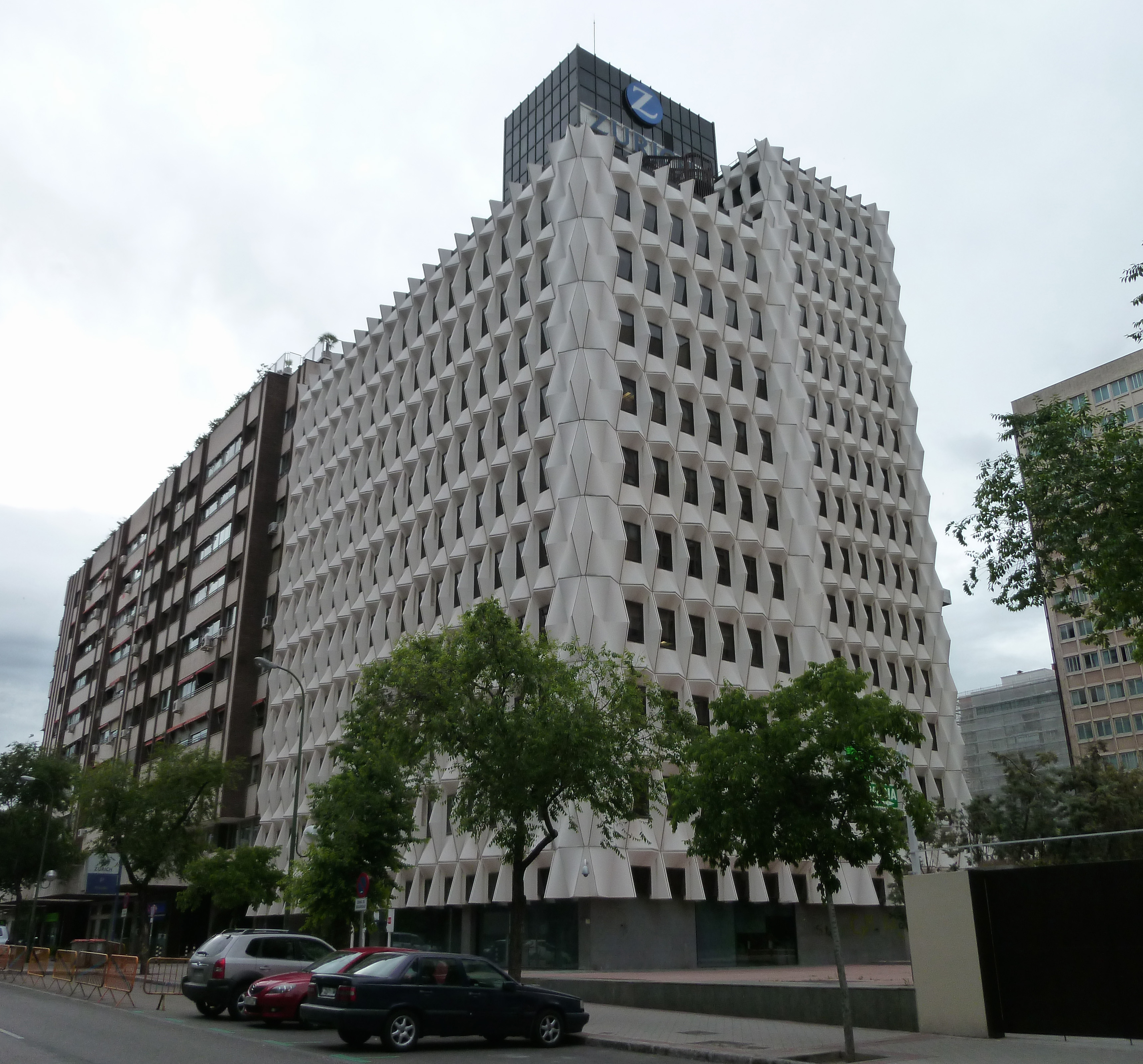
Zurich offices in Madrid, Spain

Zurich Insurance Group Ltd ("Zurich") is listed on the SIX Swiss Exchange under the ticker ZURN. As of 1 December 2012 there were 148,300,123 fully paid registered shares and 124,847 shareholders. 24.7% of the holding of the registered shares were private individuals (15.3% of all outstanding shares), 7.2% were foundations and pension funds (4.5% of all outstanding shares) and 68.1% were other legal entities (42.3% of all outstanding shares).

== Corporate social responsibility ==
In 2009, Zurich was awarded Charity Times "Best Insurance Services" and was shortlisted again in 2010. In 2012 the Zurich Community Trust (UK) won the Cross-Sector Partnership of the Year Award for its partnership with the treatment charity Addaction.

According to its website, Zurich Community Trust has donated over £60 million since 1972, with the goal of addressing key social issues. It has supported over 600 charities a year, making a measurable impact on the lives of over 80,000 people. Zurich was one of the first recipients of the Community Mark from Business in the Community which it has successfully retained for three years.

On 24 October 2002, Zurich North America hosted a ceremony at the 9/11 Tribute Center honoring the winners of its 2012 K.A.M.P. awards, a program created as a living legacy to the four employees killed on 9/11: John Keohane, Peggy Alario, Kathy Moran and Ludwig Picarro.

Zurich began a relationship with SBP, a disaster relief organization based in New Orleans, at its Zurich Classic golf tournament in New Orleans. Over the next five years, more than 1,000 Zurich employees, customers, brokers, and distributors volunteered with SBP to rebuild homes in New Orleans, Staten Island and Joplin, until in April 2014, the company announced that its Z Zurich Foundation would give SBP a $3 million grant over three years. The grant would go towards creating a Disaster Resilience and Recovery Lab—a disaster relief model that propagates best practices learned in New Orleans after Katrina to communities affected by future disasters.

In 2011, Zurich launched a free online resource – My Community Starter – designed to make getting involved in community activities more simple.

In March 2012, Zurich reinforced its commitment to the Z Zurich foundation by making an investment of $100 million.

In March 2013, Zurich announced its global flood resilience program, which aims to enhance community flood resilience by finding innovative ways to increase the impact of disaster risk reduction efforts at community, national and global levels. The first country program is taking place in Mexico and Indonesia. To maximize the community impact of the program, Zurich has formed a strategic alliance with the International Federation of Red Cross and Red Crescent Societies (IFRC).

== Controversies ==
In 2006, Zurich Financial Services settled a $171 million case relating to bid rigging and price fixing in the United States. "Businesses shopping for commercial insurance were deceived into believing they were getting the best deals available," said Abbott. "The whole anti-competitive scheme was an intentional smoke screen by several insurance players to artificially inflate premiums and pay improper commissions to those who brokered the deals." The states included in the settlement were Texas, California, Florida, Hawaii, Maryland, Massachusetts, Oregon, Pennsylvania and West Virginia. Zurich is also required to pay about $122 million in refunds to commercial policyholders in a New Jersey class action lawsuit settlement. Zurich Financial Services settled a bid-rigging and improper "finite reinsurance" transactions probe.

Zurich Financial agreed to pay $153 million in restitution and penalties and agreed to a series of reforms. Zurich apologized and acknowledged that "certain of its employees violated both acceptable business practices and Zurich's own standards of conduct by engaging in improper bidding practices and the 'finite reinsurance' transactions described in the Assurance of Discontinuance". The states included in the settlement were New York, Connecticut and Illinois.

In May 2007, Zurich Capital Markets, a subsidiary of Zurich Financial Services, paid $16.8 million to settle with the United States Securities and Exchange Commission for helping four hedge funds disguise their identities to avoid detection when making frequent trades in mutual fund shares. An SEC director stated, "By knowingly financing their hedge funds clients' deceptive market timing, ZCM reaped substantial fees at the expense of long-term mutual-fund shareholders".

In 2015, small business owners and property developers in Britain complained that Zurich's British subsidiary, Dunbar Bank, had treated them unfairly by calling in loans quickly in order to wind down its loan book after the parent company pulled out of the specialist UK property market in 2010. They claimed that 71 Dunbar borrowers had been made bankrupt in the following five-year period, many more than by any of Britain's very much larger high street banks. One Dunbar customer wrote: "Dunbar's latest set of accounts show that over 95% of its loan book is now classified as impaired or overdue [...] the equivalent figure for UK Asset Resolution, the country's bad bank, is just 37%".

In 2019, the local branch of Zurich Insurance Group was one of four insurance companies fined by Portugal's competition authority AdC for "cartel practices" regarding workplace accident, health and auto insurance.

== See also ==
- Zurich Art Prize
