= Win Son Bakery =

Taiwanese American bakery in New York City

- Interactive map of the Win Son Bakery area

General information
- Location: 164 Graham Avenue, Brooklyn, New York, United States
- Coordinates: 40.7072°N 73.943°W
- Opened: September 3, 2019

Win Son Bakery is a Taiwanese American bakery in New York City with one location in Williamsburg, Brooklyn and another in East Village, Manhattan. Operating all day, it functions triply as a bakery, coffee shop, and diner with bar service. It is known for its fusion dishes—spanning Taiwanese, French, and American influences—like the scallion pancake bacon, egg, and cheese and millet mochi donut.

== History ==
=== Williamsburg ===
In 2016, Trigg Brown and Josh Ku opened a Taiwanese American restaurant called Win Son in Williamsburg. In 2018, they announced plans to open a café-restaurant called Win Star.

One year later, on September 3, 2019, Brown and Ku opened Win Son Bakery as an "all-day café spinoff" in Williamsburg with general manager Jesse Shapell and pastry chef Danielle Spencer. It had soft-launched, with breakfast service, starting at the end of August, and trialed many of its dishes at pop-ups over the summer. Immediately, it gained lots of popularity through TikTok.

Months after, in October 2019, Win Son Bakery hosted chefs Ed Crochet and Justine MacNeil, of the restaurant and bakery Fiore, for a one-day pop-up of Italian cuisine.

At the beginning of the COVID-19 pandemic, Win Son Bakery began delivery and takeout orders in April 2020 after weeks of closure.

In 2022, Win Son Bakery began its foray into ice cream, starting with soft-serve froyo pints before launching two gelato flavors—black sesame and raspberry crunch, as well as red bean pistachio mandarin orange swirl—in line with anticipation of Lunar New Year.

=== East Village ===
In February 2024, Win Son Bakery submitted a community board application for another location in the East Village. It officially opened on March 19, 2025 after operating exclusively through DoorDash orders earlier in the month. The new storefront featured two new menu items: fish and pork bian dangs.

=== Cookbook ===
Ku and Brown, along with writer Cathy Erway, released their cookbook, Win Son Presents: A Taiwanese American Cookbook, in 2023. It was nominated for a 2024 IACP Award in the Chefs & Restaurants category.

== Critical reception ==
The Infatuation gave Win Son Bakery's East Village location an eight out of ten. Time Out gave it four out of five stars.

In October 2025, The New York Times named Win Son Bakery's pine nut sun cookie as one of 25 essential pastries to eat in New York City. Grub Street highlighted its burger, which features doufu ru and is served on milk bread.

In September 2019, Eater called Win Son Bakery "Full of QQ Pleasure" and stated that it "speaks the visual language of a cool West Coast avo-ricotta joint, but it builds upon the traditions of longtime players serving up honest, delicious, and affordable pastries in this field."

In December 2019, Bon Appétit featured Win Son Bakery in its Highly Recommend column, specifically lauding its fan tuan, or Taiwanese rice roll. The publication also released a video in December 2023 wherein Hong Kong chef Lucas Sin and Wenwen and 886 chef Eric Sze attempted to eat everything on Win Son Bakery's menu.
