= Rice roll =

Rice roll may refer to:

- Cifantuan, a Chinese dish from the Jiangnan region of China
- Rice noodle roll, a Chinese dish from the Canton region of China
- Bánh cuốn, a Vietnamese dish
- Gimbap, a Korean dish
- Gỏi cuốn, a Vietnamese dish
- Makizushi, a Japanese dish
