= Qifqi =

Albanian rice ball

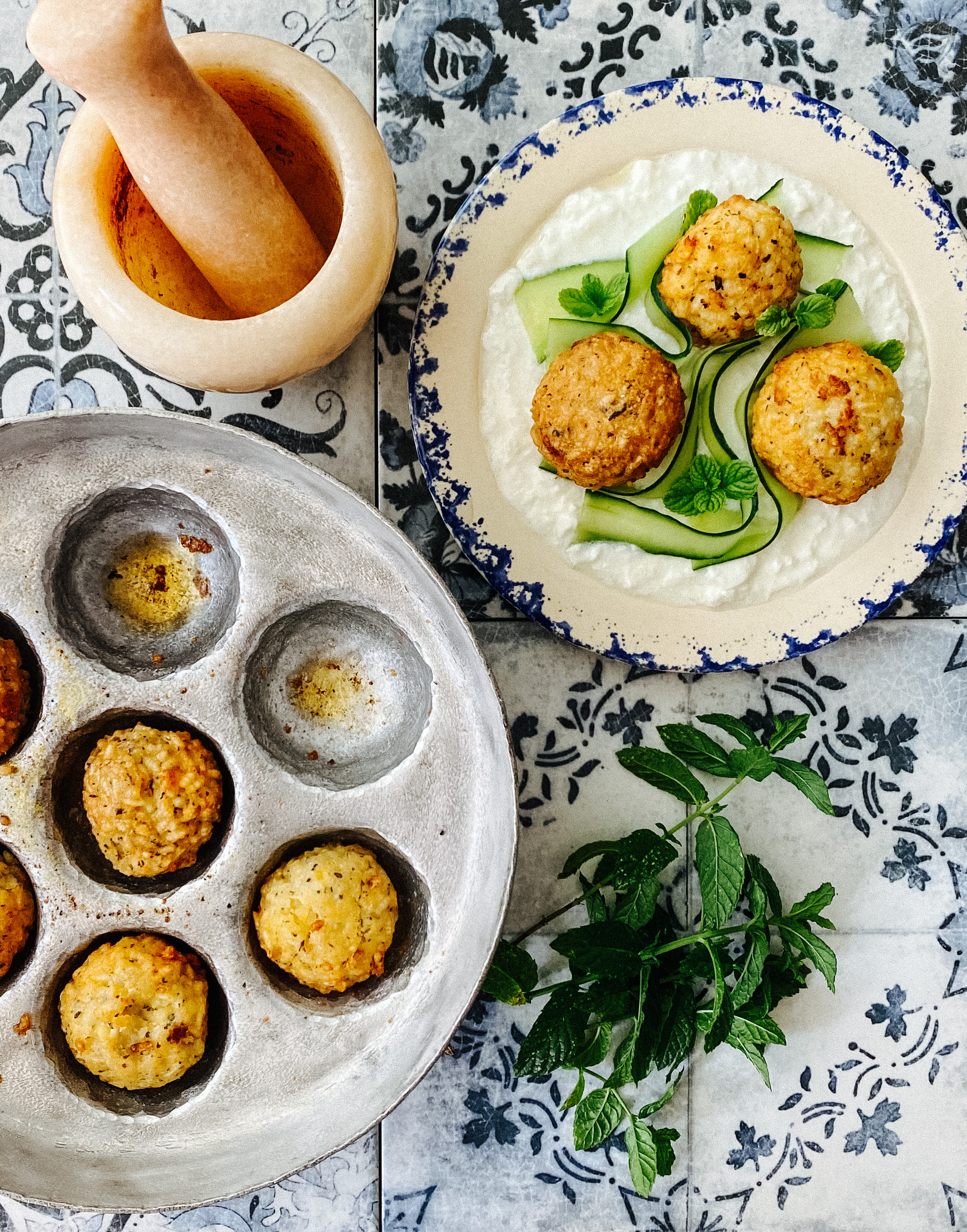
- Traditional qifqis
- Type: Rice cake
- Course: Main
- Place of origin: Albania
- Region or state: Gjirokastër
- Associated cuisine: Albanian cuisine
- Serving temperature: warm
- Main ingredients: rice, butter, salt, egg, dried mint, hot water

Qifqi is a traditional Albanian rice ball originating from the city of Gjirokastër, in southern Albania. It consists of small, round rice patties prepared from cooked rice, eggs and dried mint, then fried in a distinctive multi-cavity pan known as qifqi tigan.

Considered one of the signature dishes of the regional cuisine, qifqi is commonly served as an appetizer, side dish or light meal.

== History ==
Qifqi is recognized as a culinary staple of Gjirokastër. According to local belief, the dish was once prepared for women who had recently given birth, as it was thought to promote the production of breast milk.

Another popular explanation attributes the dish’s origin to the practical reuse of leftover pilaf after weddings and other large celebrations. Families would combine the remaining rice with eggs and herbs to create small patties that were fried until crisp.

Recipes vary between households, but the essential ingredients of rice, eggs and dried mint, remain largely unchanged.

== Ingredients ==
The recipe shown is intended for 4 servings:

- 150 g rice
- 20 g butter
- 300 ml chicken stock or hot water
- 1 teaspoon coarse salt
- 3 eggs
- 1 teaspoon salt
- 1 tablespoon dried mint
- 1 teaspoon ground black pepper
- 100 ml olive oil (for frying)

== Preparation ==
Qifqi is prepared by first cooking pilaf-style rice in butter with chicken stock or hot water until the liquid is fully absorbed. After cooling, the rice is mixed with eggs, dried mint, salt and black pepper to form a soft mixture.

The mixture is spooned into the cavities of a traditional copper or tinned aluminium pan containing four to seven round molds. Once one side has browned, each qifqi is turned with a spoon and cooked until evenly golden on both sides.

== Serving ==
Qifqi is typically served hot and is often accompanied by white cheese, yogurt or dhallë (a yogurt-based beverage). Generally associated with home cooking, the dish is frequently offered during family gatherings and regional culinary events.
