= Win Son =

Taiwanese American restaurant in Brooklyn, New York

- Interactive map of Win Son

Restaurant information
- Established: 2016
- Location: 159 Graham Avenue, Brooklyn, New York, United States
- Coordinates: 40.7075°N 73.9434°W

Win Son is a Taiwanese American restaurant in Williamsburg, Brooklyn. It focuses on traditional Taiwanese food reinterpreted "through a New American lens, incorporating local, well-sourced ingredients."

In 2017, Bon Appétit called Win Son "One of Brooklyn's Hottest Restaurants." In the same year, they were spotlighted in Eater's Young Guns series.

== History ==
In 2016, Trigg Brown and Josh Ku founded and opened Win Son in Williamsburg thanks to Kickstarter support. Brown had previously worked as a chef, while Ku had a background in real estate. They met at and discussed Taiwanese cuisine a friends' backyard barbecue in Bed-Stuy in 2012, after which they envisioned a restaurant together.

The name, Win Son, meaning abundance, came from a textile company which Ku's grandfather had run.

In 2019, Brown and Ku opened Win Son Bakery, also in Williamsburg. They opened a second Win Son Bakery location, this time in the East Village, in March 2025.

== Cookbook ==
On January 24, 2023, Brown and Ku released a cookbook co-authored with Cathy Erway titled Win Son Presents a Taiwanese American Cookbook. It provides 100 recipes on Taiwanese American fare in addition to "a behind-the-scenes view of their enterprise, partnership, and relationship to Taiwan" and is considered "the first Taiwanese cookbook published by a major outlet in the United States." The two had met Erway prior to Win Son's opening through the director of radio at Heritage Radio, where Brown was an intern at the time.

The cookbook was nominated for a 2024 IACP Award.

== Critical reception ==
Eater called Win Son "One of NYC's Most Thrilling Meals," specifically recommending dishes like its stinky tofu, sloppy bao, fly's head, and others.

== Controversy ==
In July 2020, Brown temporarily stepped away from Win Son due to allegations from staff that he had "fostered a hostile workplace." Bartender Rafael Joson had posted several of the allegations on Instagram earlier in the month, some of which claimed that Brown "ran a kitchen rife with verbal abuse and intimidation—including allegedly throwing a cleaver, food items, and, in one instance, a bell that narrowly missed a server’s head."

Afterward, Brown and Ku pledged to reform the restaurant by establishing an HR department and seeking professional help for Brown's anger issues, among other initiatives. Joson commended the "positive steps" taken but still demanded acknowledgement of Brown's abusive actions toward a woman employee.

== See also ==
- Win Son Bakery
