= Rice ball =

Any food item made from rice in a ball shape

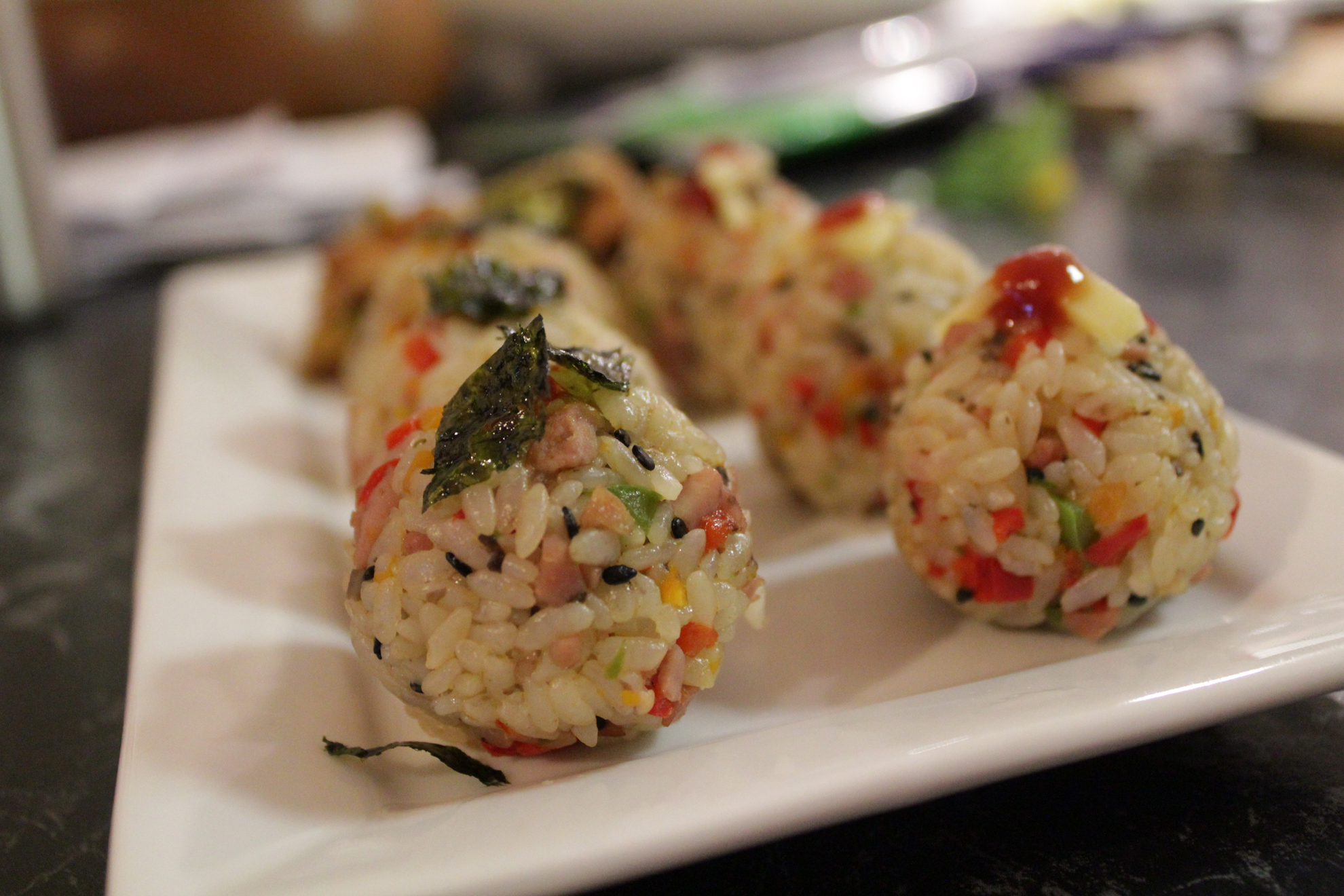
Jumeok-bap, a type of Korean rice ball

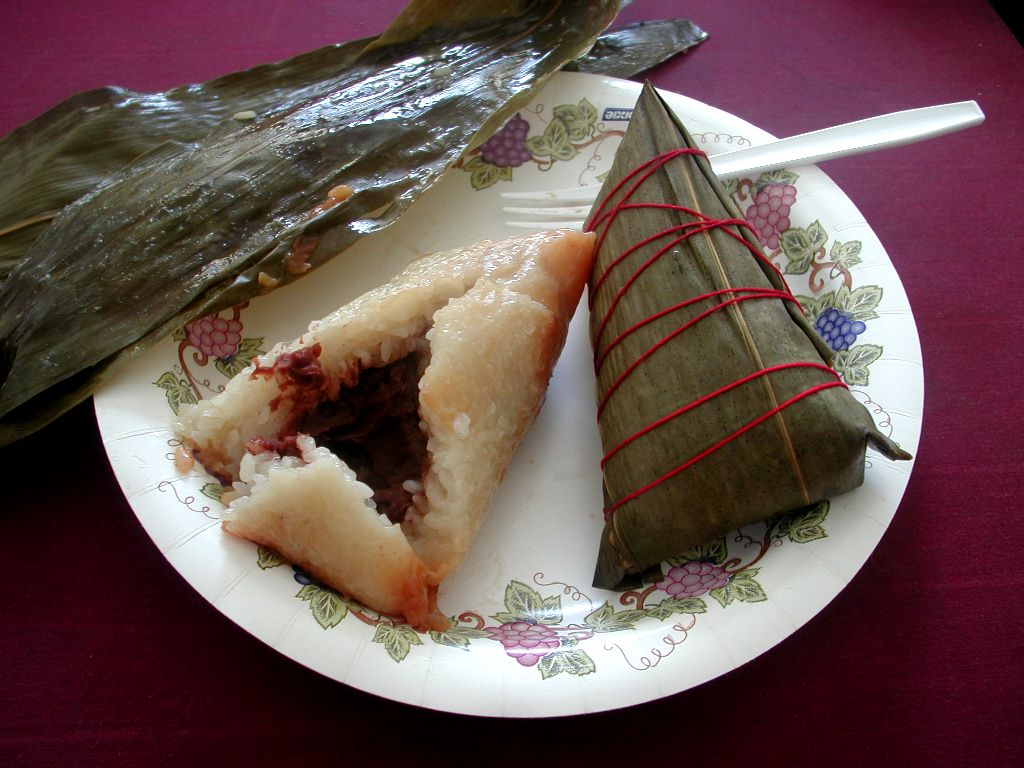
Zongzi, opened with filling (left) and still wrapped in bamboo leaves (right)

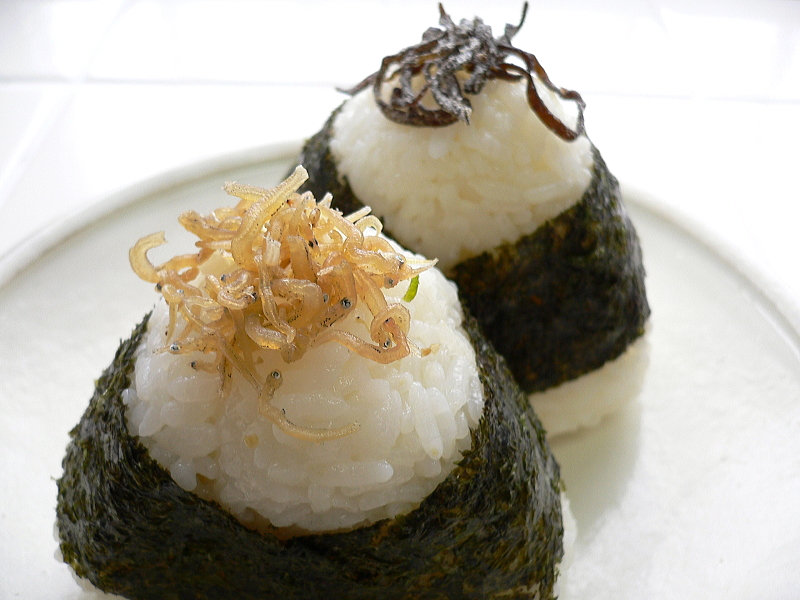
Onigiri

A rice ball may be any kind of food item made from rice that has been shaped, condensed, or otherwise combined into a ball shape. Rice balls exist in many different cultures in which rice is eaten, and are particularly prevalent in Asia. Rice balls are portable, making them a popular choice for picnics, road trips, and packed lunches. They are also often eaten as a snack or side dish with meals.

The rice may be seasoned with a variety of ingredients, such as salt, furikake, or other seasonings, and may also be topped or filled with a variety of foods, such as fish, meat, or vegetables.

== Types of rice balls ==
Types of rice ball include:

- Arancini, an Italian fried rice ball coated with breadcrumbs.
- Jumeok-bap, a Korean rice ball from cooked rice formed into oval shapes.
- Omo tuo, a Ghanaian staple food that is more smooth and soft due to its higher volume of water, usually eaten with peanut soup.
- Onigiri (お握り), a Japanese rice ball made from white rice formed into triangular or oval shapes.
- Pinda, rice balls offered to ancestors during Hindu funeral rites and ancestor worship.
- Supplì, an Italian fried rice ball coated with breadcrumbs.
- Tangyuan (汤圆), a Chinese rice ball made from glutinous rice flour.
- Zongzi, a Chinese rice ball with different fillings and wrapped in bamboo or reed leaves.
- Cifantuan, a sticky rice ball filled with Chinese fried dough, pork floss, and pickled vegetable.
- Khao tom, a Thai rice ball made with cooked rice and various fillings, wrapped in banana leaves.
- Cơm nắm, a Vietnamese rice ball is often served with sesame salt.
