= Gimbap =

Korean dish

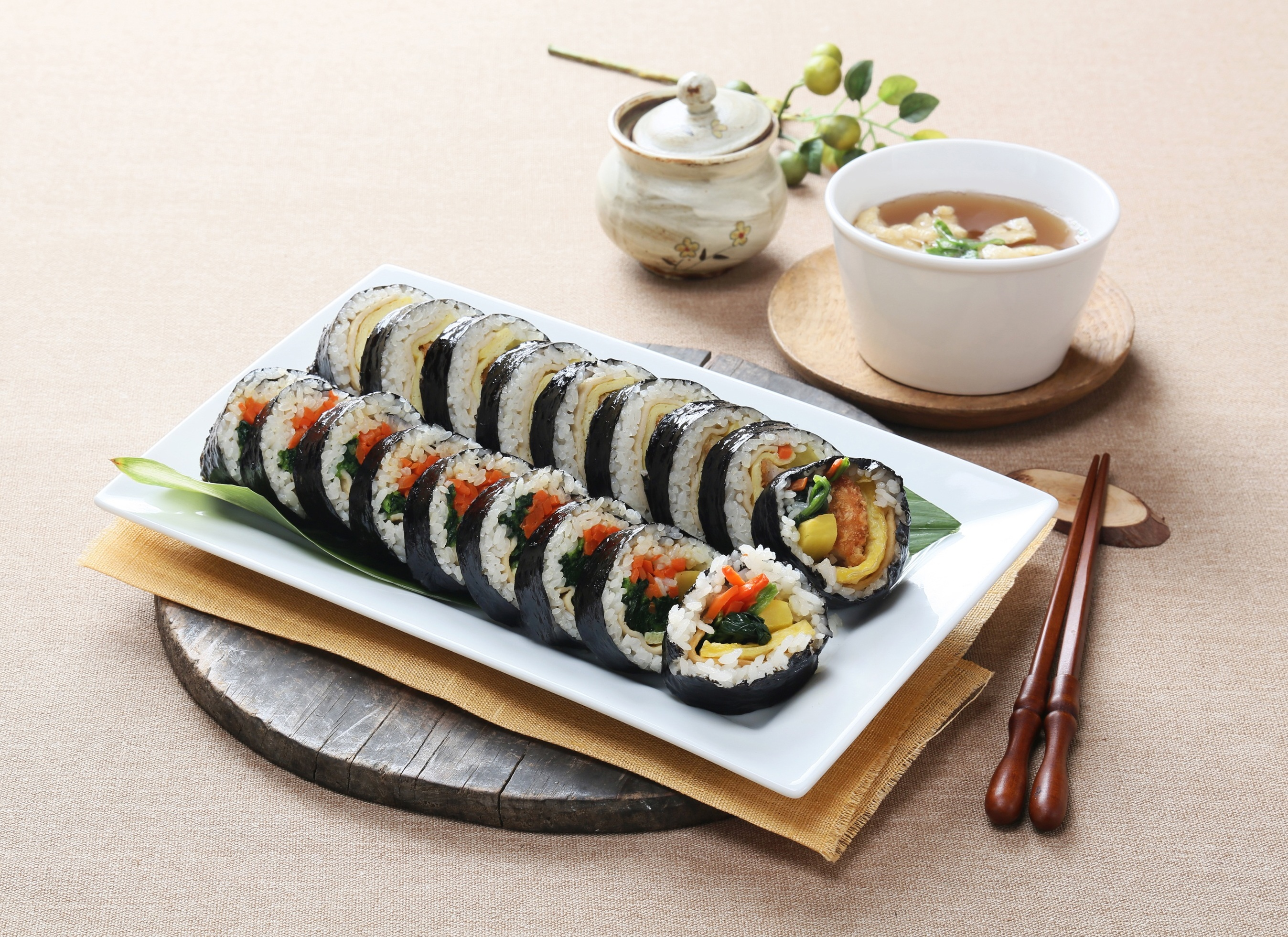
- Sliced gimbap
- Region or state: Japan (origin); Korea (adaptation)
- Main ingredients: Gim, bap
- Variations: Chungmu-gimbap, samgak-gimbap

Korean name
- Hangul: 김밥
- RR: gimbap
- MR: kimpap
- IPA: [ki(ː)m.p͈ap̚]

Gimbap (/kimbæp, kɪ-, -bɑːp/; Korean: 김밥; lit. 'seaweed rice'; IPA: [kim.p͈ap̚]), also romanized as kimbap, is a Korean dish made from bap (cooked rice), vegetables, and optionally, cooked seafood or meat rolled in gim—dried sheets of seaweed—and served in bite-sized slices.

Reference works describe gimbap as developing from Japanese norimaki, introduced to Korea during the period of Japanese colonial rule, while also noting that Korea had earlier traditions of wrapping rice and side dishes in seaweed, such as bokssam, from the Joseon era, which are sometimes cited as precursors rather than direct equivalents. However, the style of rolling seaweed into a ball on bamboo mat and cutting it to eat is generally agreed to have originated in Japan.

The dish is often part of a packed meal, or dosirak, to be eaten at picnics and outdoor events, and it can serve as a light lunch along with danmuji (yellow pickled radish) and kimchi. It is a popular takeout food in South Korea and in other countries.

Modern variations range from vegetarian and keto-friendly options to specialty rolls. It is also a staple of Korean bunsik culture, frequently paired with tteokbokki or ramyeon.

== Etymology ==
Gim (김) refers to edible seaweed in the genus Porphyra and Pyropia. Bap (밥) broadly refers to cooked rice.

The term gimbap was used in a 1935 Korean newspaper article but at the time, the loanword norimaki was used as well. Norimaki, borrowed from the name of a similar Japanese dish, was part of the Japanese vocabulary that entered into the Korean language during Japanese occupation (1910–1945). The two words were used interchangeably until gimbap was made the universal term, as part of efforts to clear away remnants of Japanese colonialism and purify the Korean language.

== History ==
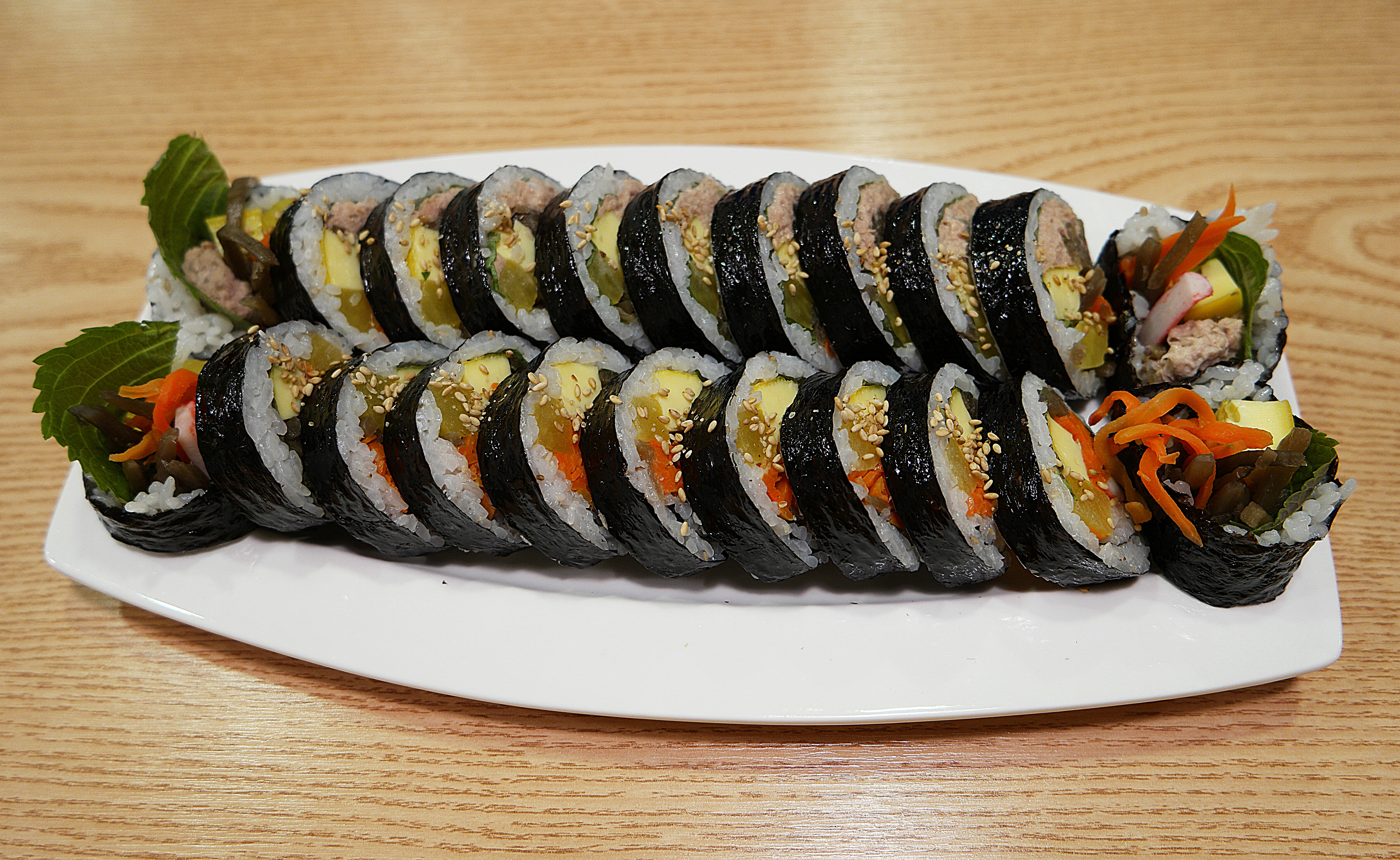
Sliced gimbap

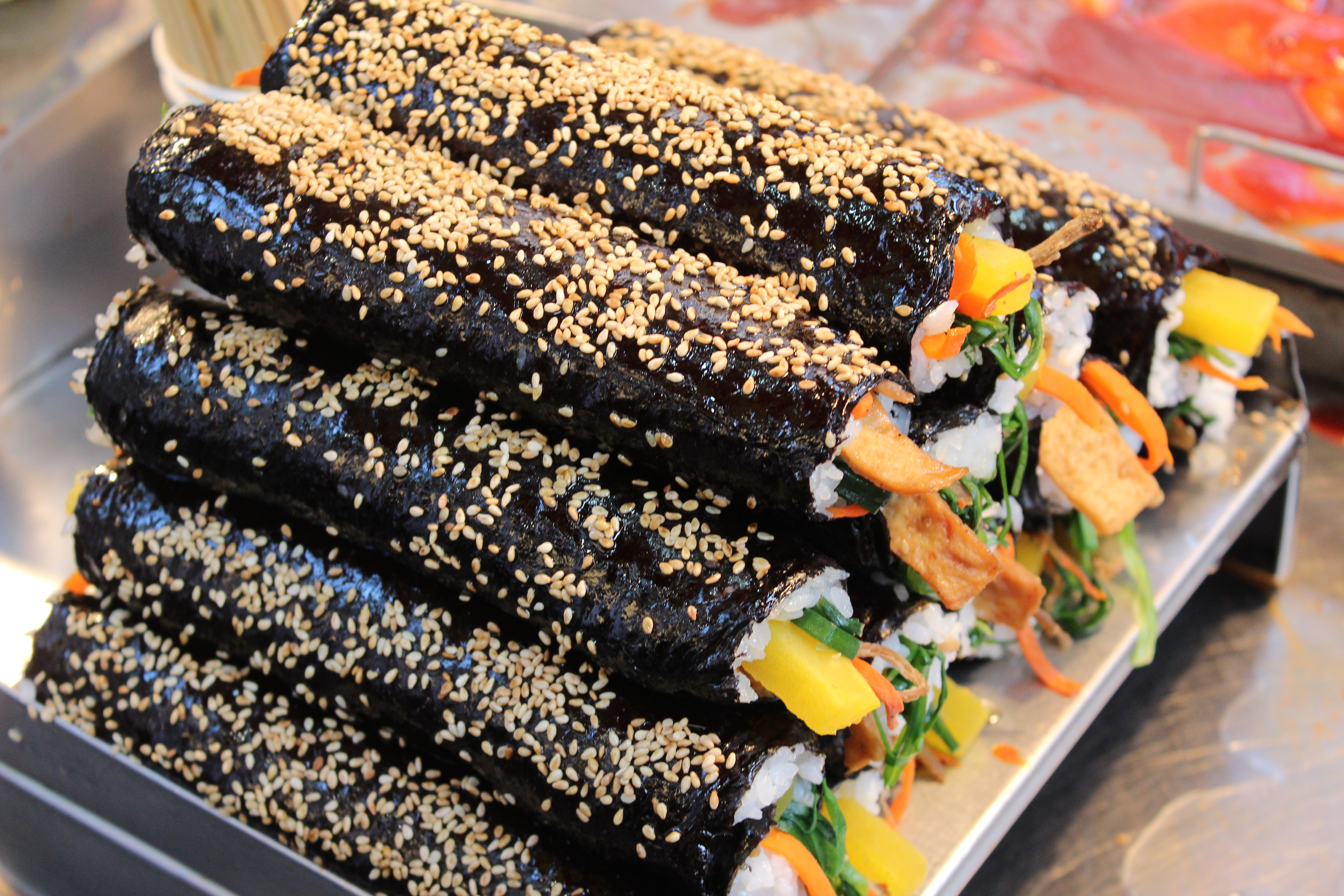
Unsliced gimbap with sesame

The origins of gimbap are debated. One commonly accepted theory suggests that the dish is derived from the introduction of the Japanese sushi variant makizushi to Korea during the Japanese occupation of Korea. During that period, Korean cuisine adopted Western food and drink, as well as some Japanese food items such as bento (dosirak in Korean) or sushi rolled in sheets of seaweed. Since then, gimbap has become a distinct dish, often utilizing traditional Korean flavors, as well as sesame oil, instead of rice vinegar. This theory is supported by a newspaper from 1935, in which the term gimbap first appeared in Korea.

An alternative theory, suggested in the Encyclopedia of Korean Culture, published by the Academy of Korean Studies, is that the food was developed from the long-established local tradition of rolling bap (cooked rice) and banchan (side dishes) in gim. Production of gim in Gyeongsang and Jeolla provinces is reported in books from the fifteenth century, such as Kyŏngsang-do chiriji (Geographic Gazetteer of Kyŏngsang Province) and Sinjŭng Tongguk yŏji sŭngnam. Yŏryang Sesigi (열양세시기), a Joseon book written in 1819 by Kim Mae-sun (김매순; 金邁淳), refers to cooked rice and filling rolled with gim as bokssam (복쌈; transcribed using the hanja 縛占, pronounced bakjeom in Korean).

Gimbap is usually seasoned with sesame oil and salt, while Japanese norimaki is seasoned with rice vinegar, sugar, and salt.

== Ingredients and preparation ==
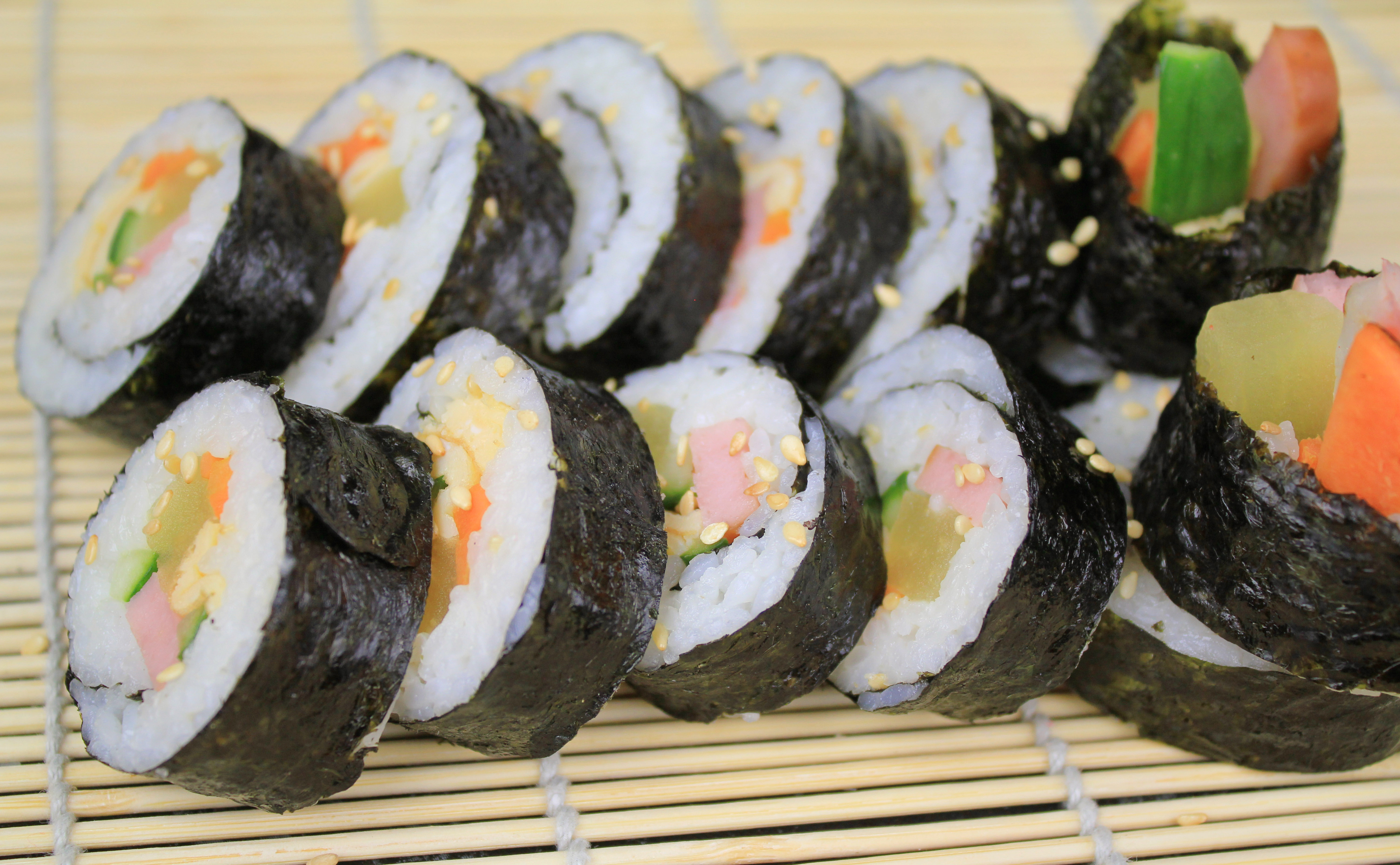
Finished gimbap

Seaweed and rice are the two basic components of gimbap. While short-grain white rice is most commonly used, short-grain brown rice, black rice, or other grains may also serve as the filling.

Some varieties of gimbap include cheese, spicy cooked squid, kimchi, luncheon meat, pork cutlet, pepper, or spicy tuna. The gim may be brushed with sesame oil or sprinkled with sesame seeds. In one variation, sliced pieces of gimbap may be lightly fried with an egg coating, which allows stale gimbap to be eaten.

Fillings vary, often with vegetarian and vegan options. Popular ingredients include danmuji (yellow pickled radish), ham, beef, imitation crab meat, egg strips, kimchi, bulgogi, spinach, carrot, burdock root, cucumber, canned tuna, or kkaennip (perilla leaves).

To make the dish, gim sheets are toasted over low heat, cooked rice is lightly seasoned with salt and sesame oil, and vegetable and meat ingredients are seasoned and stir-fried or pan-fried. The toasted gim is then laid on a gimbal—a bamboo gimbap roller—with a thin layer of cooked rice placed evenly on top. Other ingredients are placed on the rice and rolled into a cylindrical shape, typically 3–4 centimetres (1.2–1.6 in) in diameter. The rolled gimbap is then sliced into bite-sized pieces.

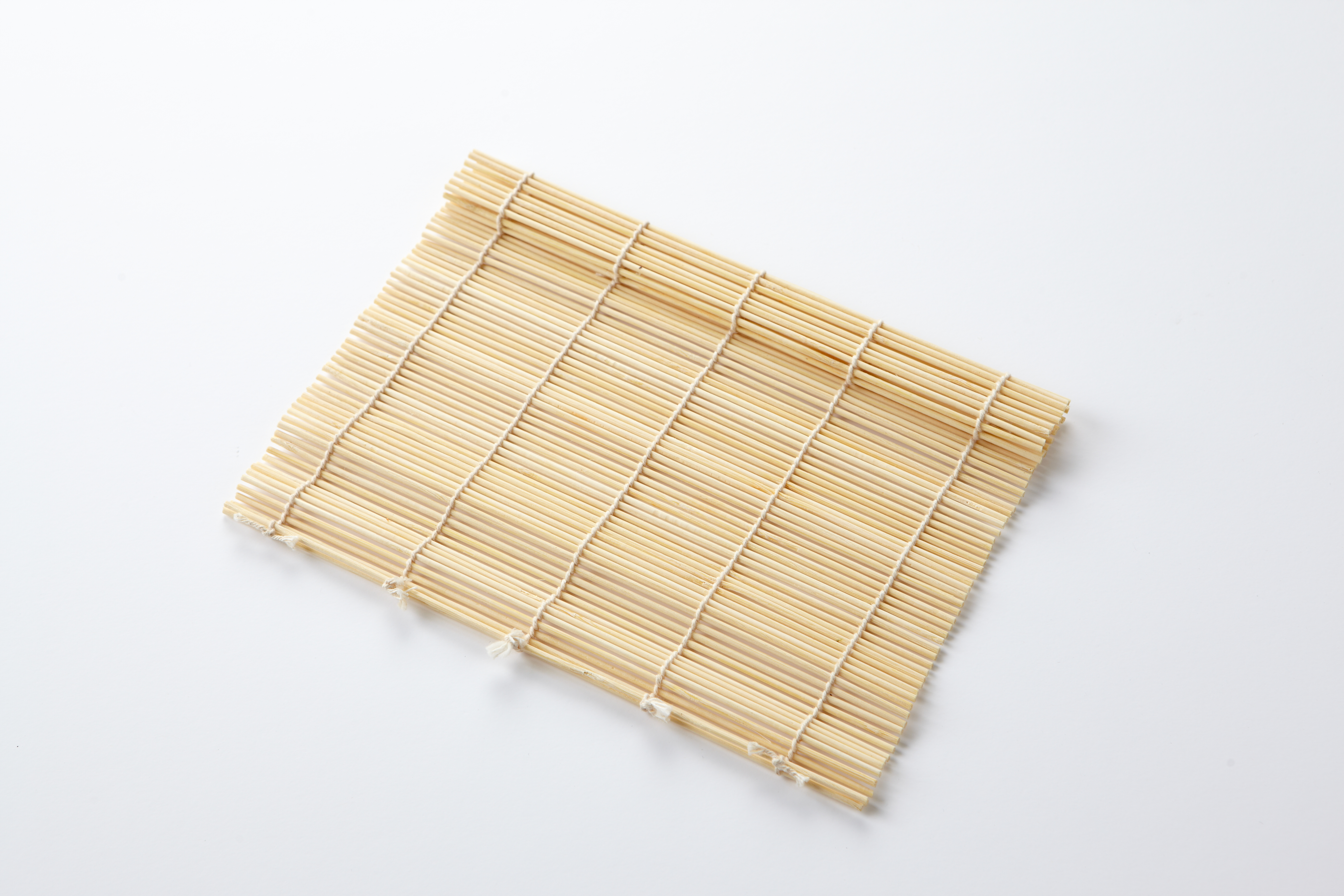
Gimbal, bamboo gimbap roller

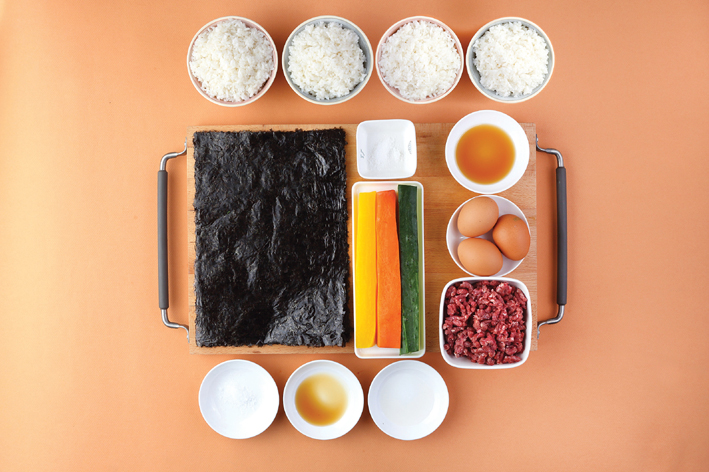
Ingredients for gimbap

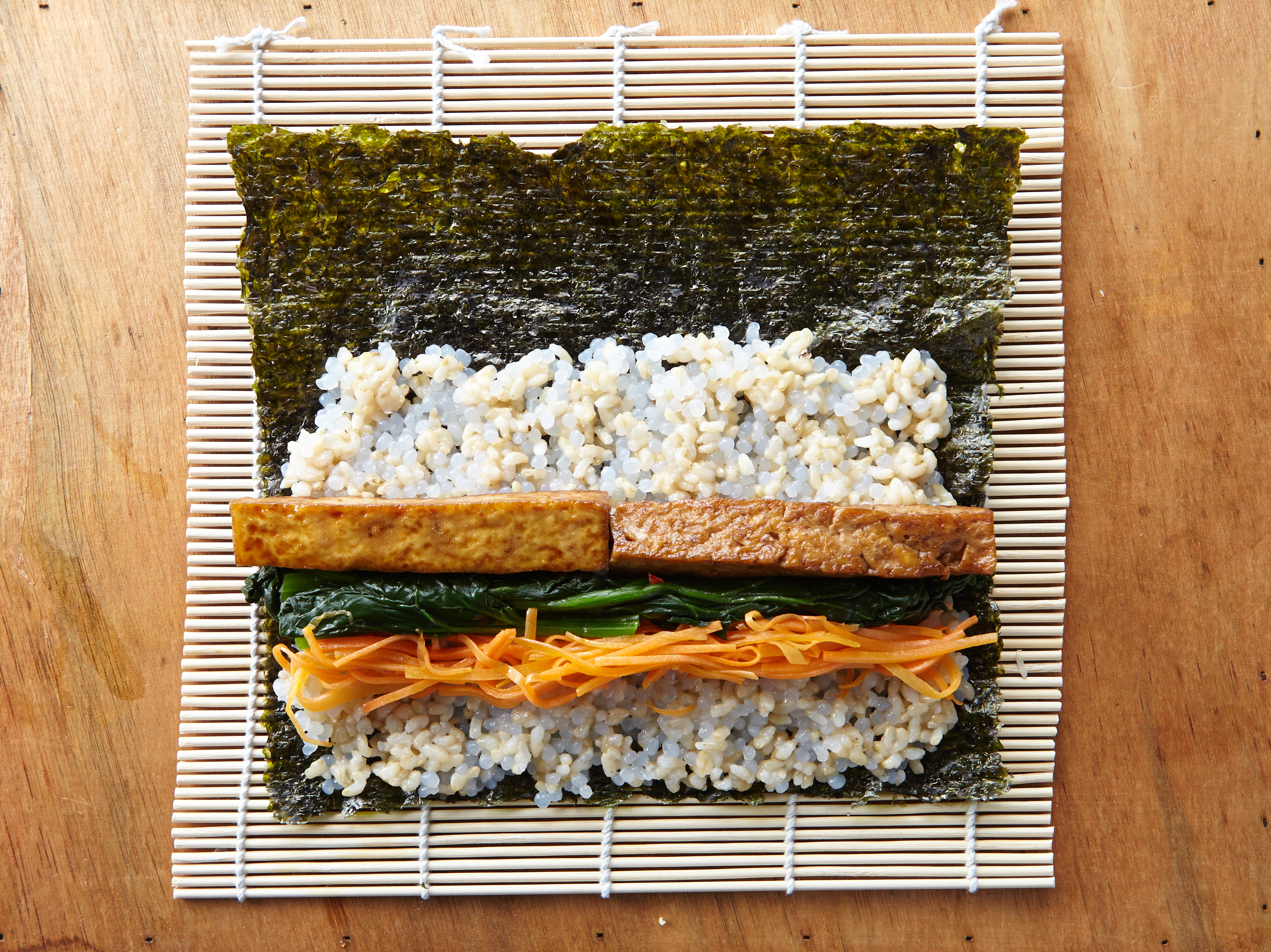
Arranging the ingredients

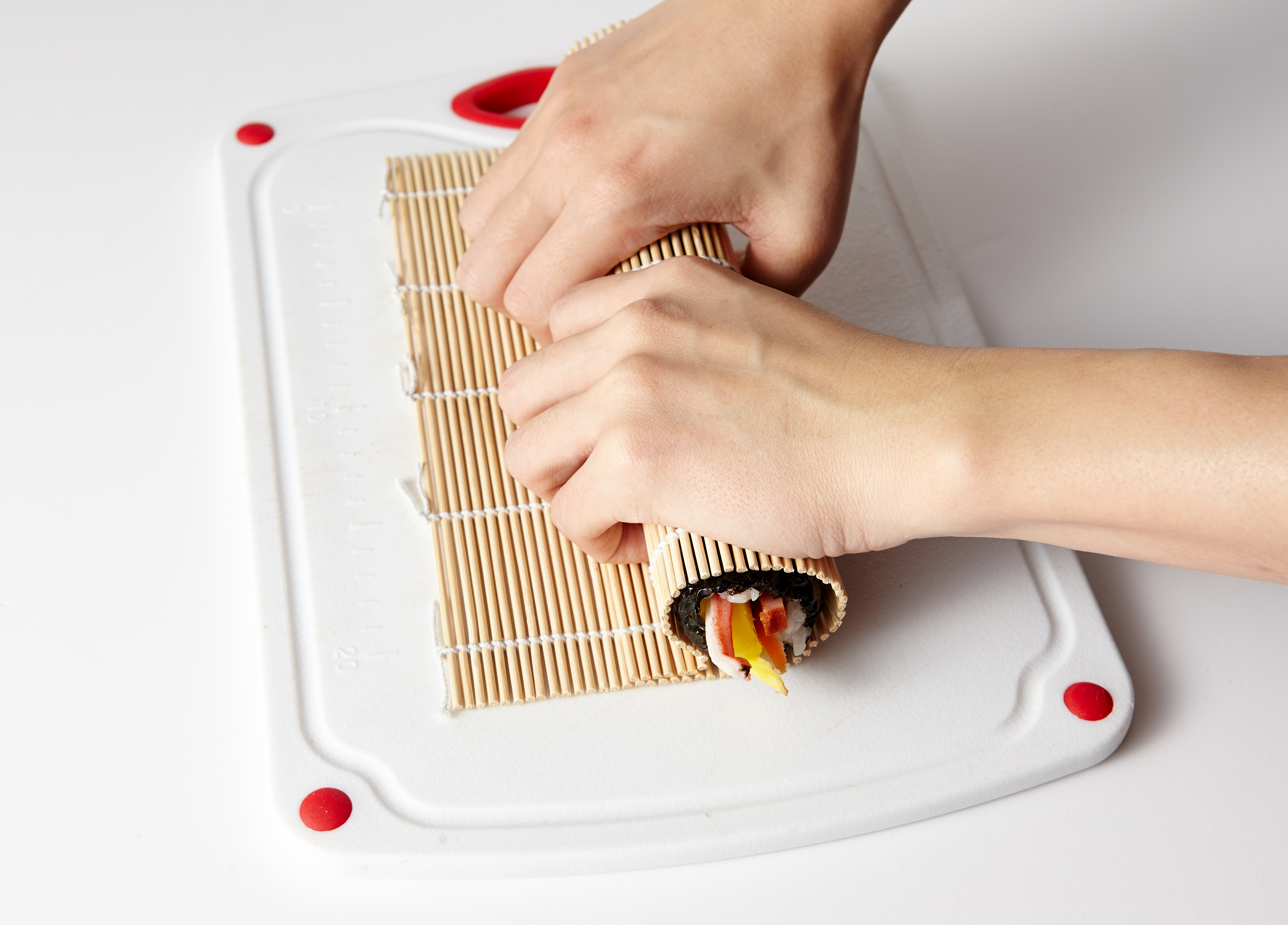
Rolling gimbap

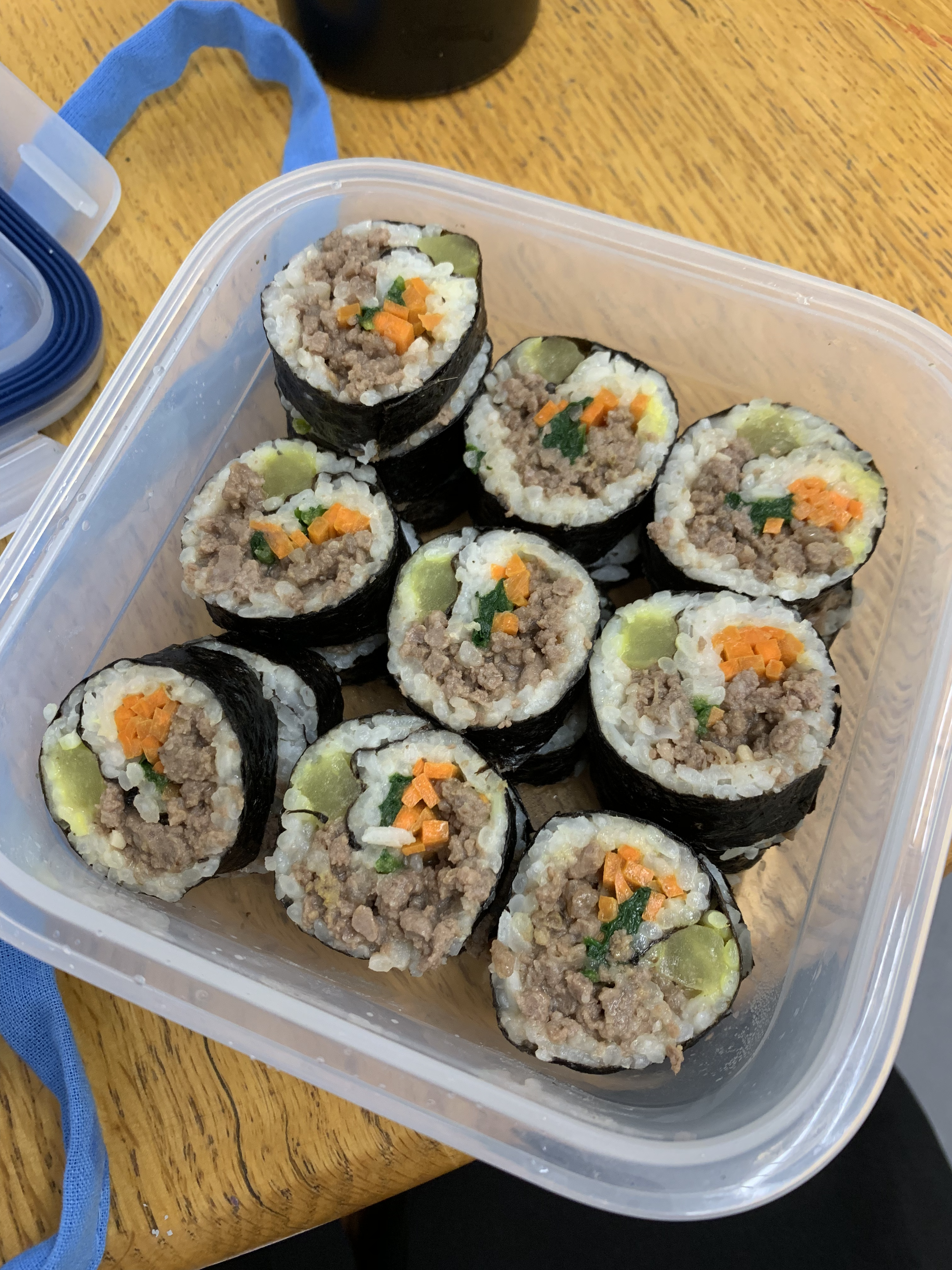
Gimbap with meat

== Variants ==
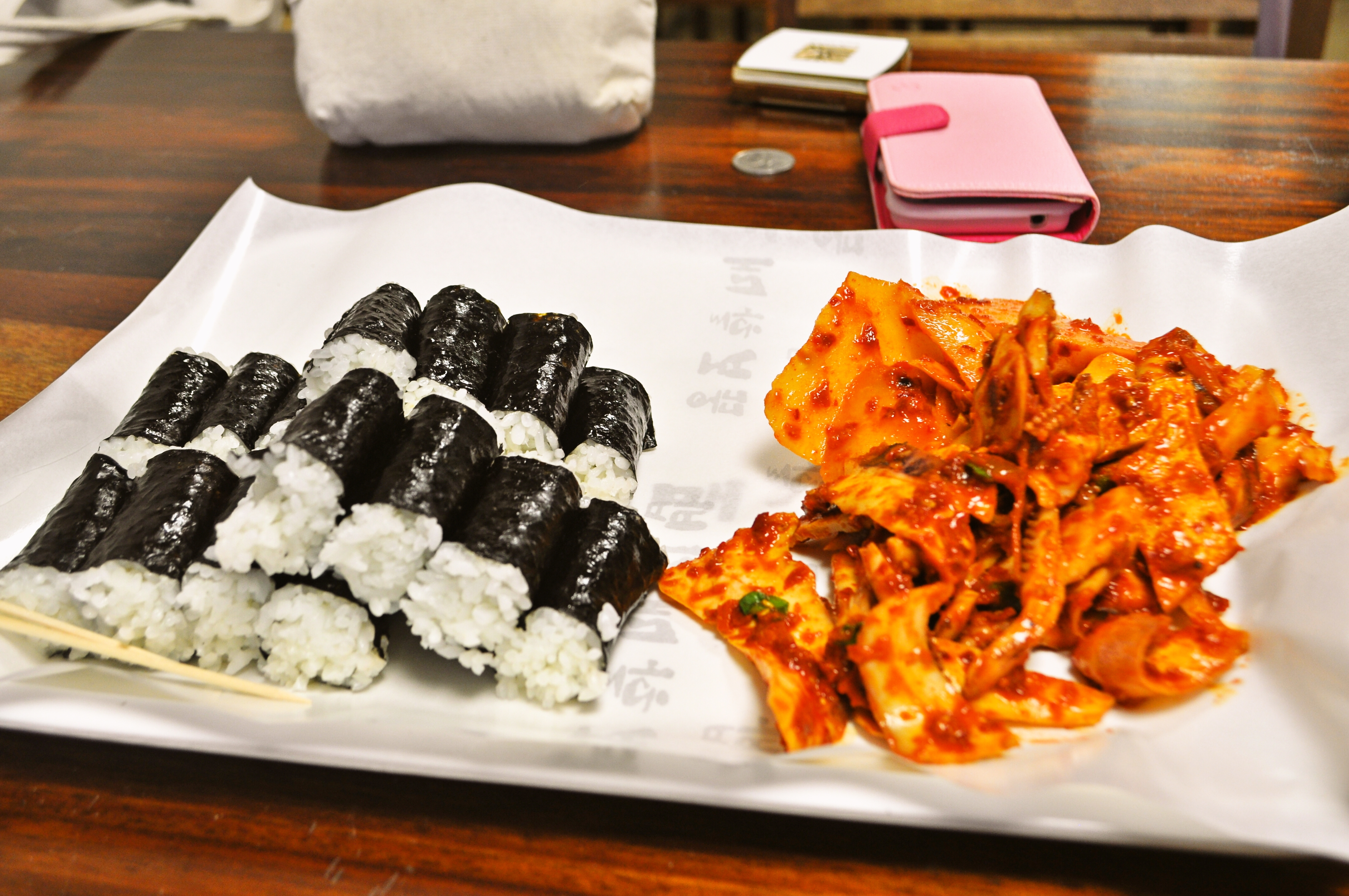
Chungmu-gimbap

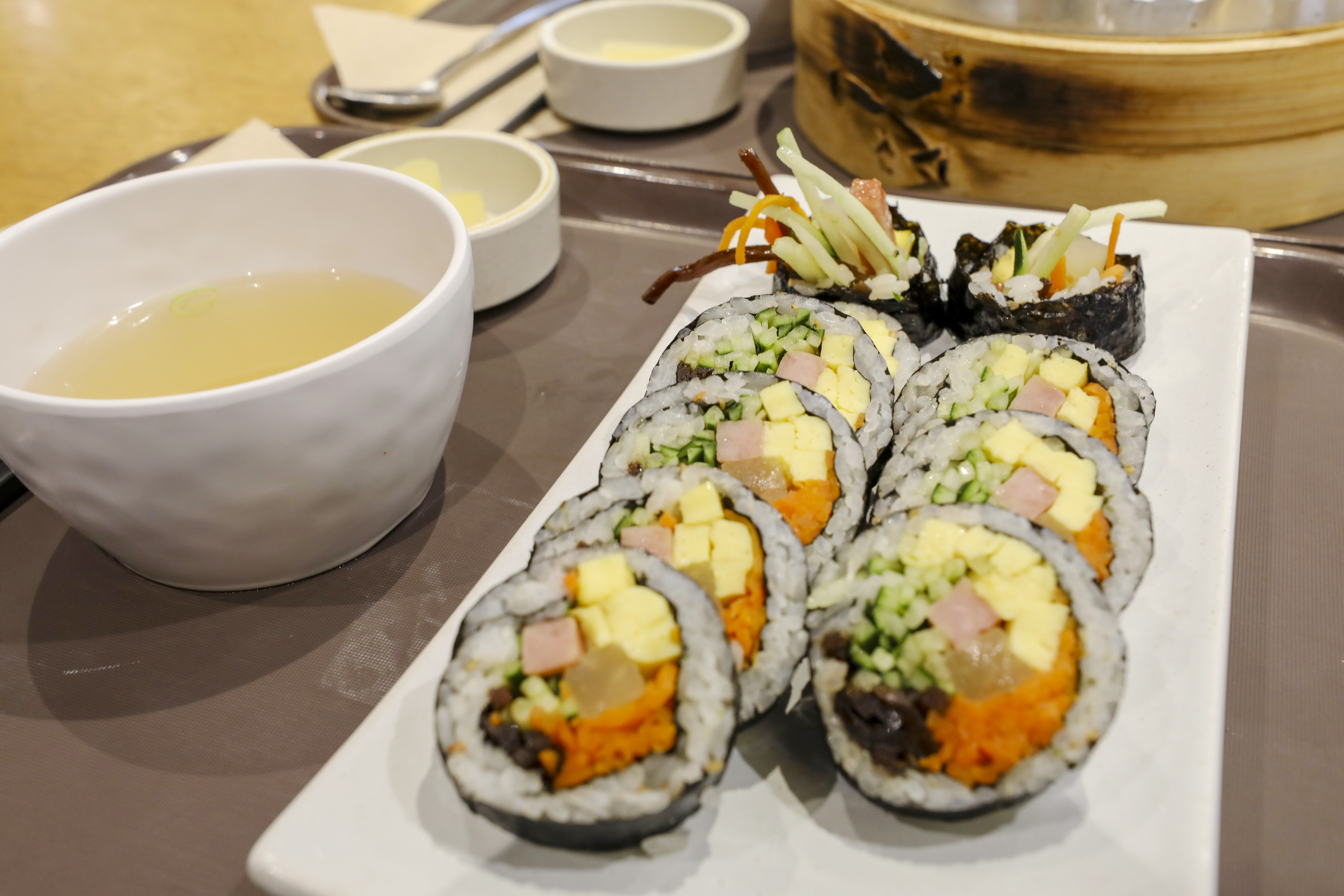
Vegetable gimbap

- Chungmu-gimbap (충무김밥) — originating from the seaside city of Chungmu (currently Tongyeong), the dish features thinner rolls with an unseasoned surface and only rice as the filler ingredient. It is served with spicy ojingeo-muchim (squid salad) and seokbakji (radish kimchi).
- Samgak-gimbap (삼각김밥) — literally "triangle-shaped gimbap". This variety is similar to Japanese onigiri and is sold in convenience stores in South Korea. Fillings vary greatly; the expiration date is one day; it typically provides between 600 and 850 kilojoules (140 and 200 kcal) of food energy.

== Frozen gimbap and international popularity ==
According to South Korean media reports, frozen gimbap—produced using rapid-freezing and moisture-control technology said to extend shelf life to up to 12 months—was reported to have sold out at Trader Joe's stores in the United States in 2023, with an initial shipment of 250 tons cited as selling out within weeks of introduction. Because U.S. import regulations restrict certain meat products, exported frozen gimbap has reportedly replaced meat fillings with plant-based ingredients such as fried tofu and burdock root in some cases. Korean outlets attributed part of the product's visibility to social media videos in which people were shown trying the dish. According to South Korea's customs data cited by domestic press, exports of frozen gimbap and related rice-based convenience foods increased in the years following, with reports in 2026 describing export figures as reaching new highs; media accounts also described the product's availability expanding into markets including Japan, China, and several European countries.

== See also ==
- Jumeok-bap
- Ssam
