= Cơm nắm =

Vietnam rice dish

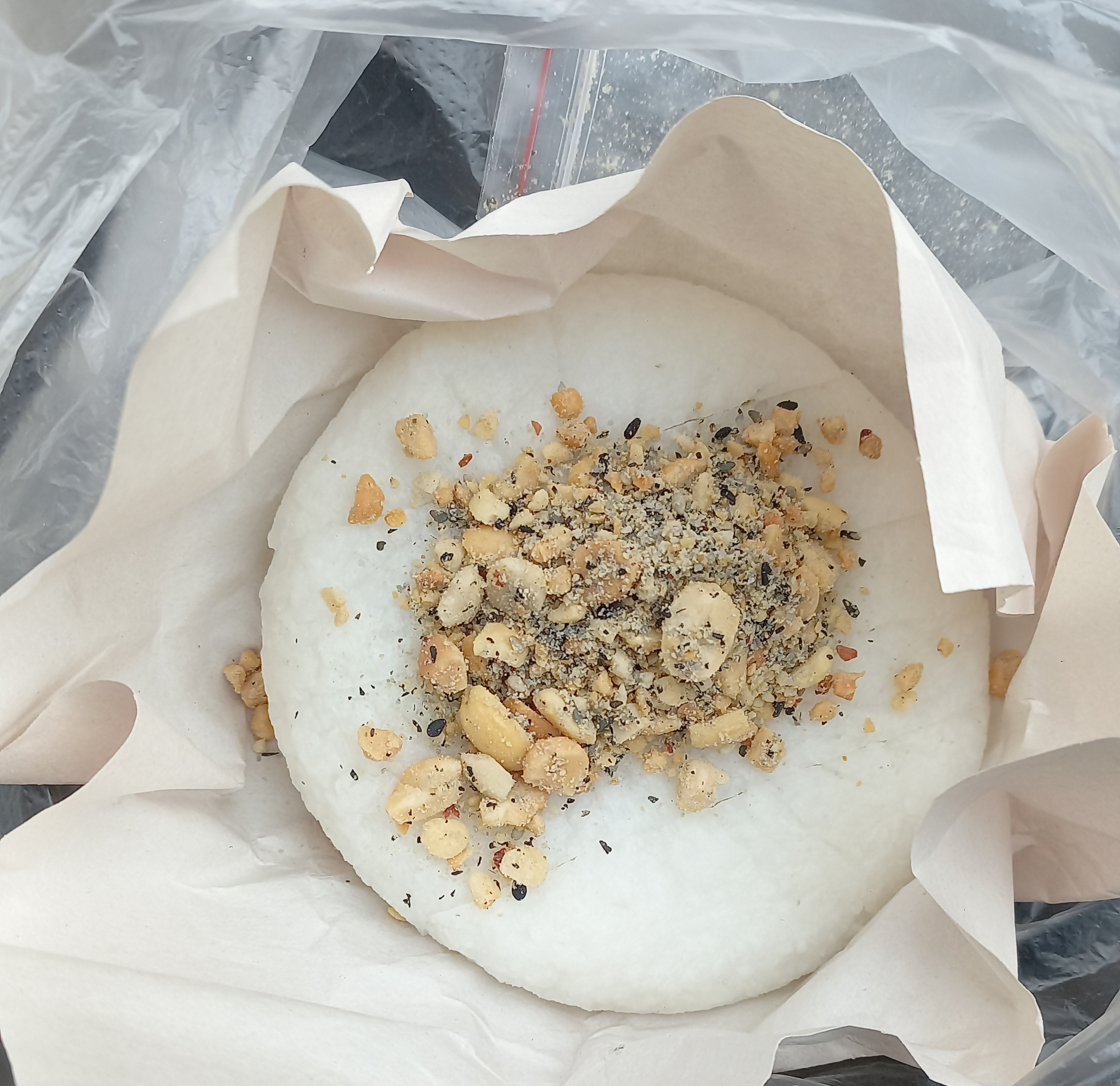
- Cơm nắm served with sesame salt
- Place of origin: Vietnam
- Region or state: Northern Vietnam

Cơm nắm is a Vietnam rice dish of the Northern Vietnam region that is shaped into a roll. The dish is commonly carried by those traveling to unfamiliar areas without restaurants or ingredients familiar to them.

== Varieties ==
- Cơm nắm muối vừng - rice balls with salt and sesame
- Cơm nắm lá cọ Phù Ninh - rice balls in palm leaf of Phù Ninh District

== See also ==
- Onigiri
