= Wenwen =

Taiwanese restaurant in Brooklyn, New York

- Interactive map of Wenwen

Restaurant information
- Established: February 1, 2022
- Location: 1025 Manhattan Avenue, Brooklyn, New York, United States
- Coordinates: 40.734°N 73.9551°W

Wenwen is a Taiwanese restaurant in Greenpoint, Brooklyn. It is known for its fun menu items like a $69 Long Island iced tea and the BDSM Chicken. In 2022, it was named to the Michelin Guide.

== History ==
Wenwen was opened on February 1, 2022, by Andy Chuang and Eric Sze, two chefs behind 886, a restaurant in East Village, Manhattan. It had taken a year and a half to launch.

Known for their rowdy and wild restauranteuring, Chuang and Sze sought a more serious and mature challenge in dining and service through Wenwen. Its menu thus incorporates some of 886's most popular dishes alongside more unique and sophisticated offerings. (Still, they still kept things "fun" by adding a $69 drink on the menu, as well as a dish called "BDSM Chicken.")

The name, Wenwen, comes from two women in Sze's life: Wenchi, his mother, and Wenhui, his wife.

== Critical reception ==
Time Out New York gave Wenwen four out of five stars.

The New York Times gave it two out of four stars, naming it a Critic's Pick.

The Infatuation gave it an 8 out of 10, specifically recommending the BDSM Chicken as the best savory item on its menu, and called it one of the best restaurants in Greenpoint.

Eater called it "a worthy sequel to [Chuang and Sze's] East Village restaurant."
