= Onigiri =

Japanese rice ball

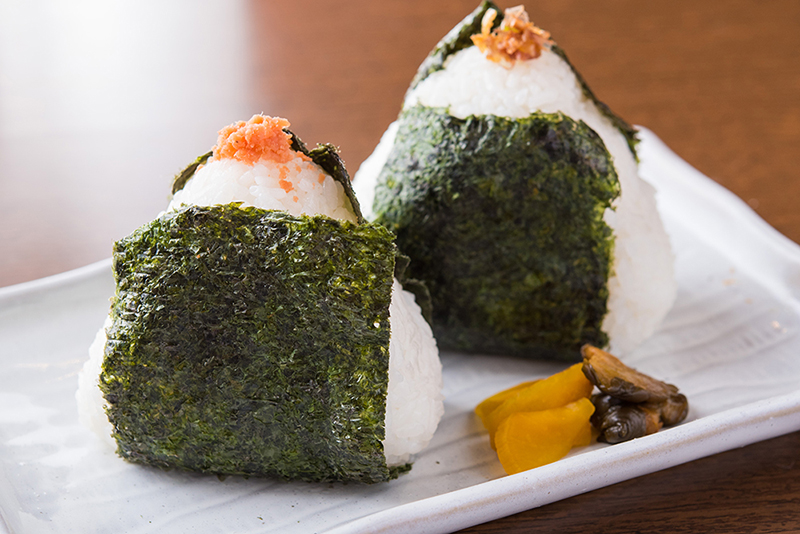
- Onigiri wrapped in nori, with takuan pickles. In traditional Japanese onigiri, the filling is never placed on top.
- Type: Rice balls
- Place of origin: Japan
- Associated cuisine: Japanese
- Main ingredients: Japonica rice
- Similar dishes: Arancini, cifantuan, jumeok-bap, zongzi

Onigiri (おにぎり, お握り or 御握り), also known as omusubi (おむすび or お結び) or nigirimeshi (握り飯), is a Japanese rice ball made from white rice. It is usually formed into triangular or cylindrical shapes, and wrapped in nori (seaweed). (Note: The type of onigiri wrapped in nori is commonly called Norimaki-onigiri.) While modern onigiri can be filled with a wide variety of ingredients, including both savory and sweet fillings, traditional fillings are often salty or sour, such as salted salmon, umeboshi (pickled Japanese plum), katsuobushi (smoked and fermented bonito), kombu tsukudani (sweet simmered kelp), tarako or mentaiko (pollock roe), or takanazuke (pickled Japanese mustard greens). Because it is easily portable and eaten by hand, onigiri has been used as portable food or bento from ancient times to the present day.

Originally, it was used as a way to use and store left-over rice, but it later became a regular meal. Many Japanese convenience stores and supermarkets stock onigiri with various fillings and flavors. It has become so mainstream that it is even served in izakayas and sit-down restaurants. There are even specialized shops which only sell onigiri to take out. Due to the popularity of this trend in Japan, onigiri has become a popular staple in Japanese restaurants worldwide.

Onigiri is not a form of sushi and should not be confused with the type of sushi called nigirizushi or simply nigiri. Onigiri is made with plain rice (sometimes lightly salted), while sushi is made of rice with vinegar, sugar, and salt. Onigiri makes rice portable and easy to eat as well as preserving it, while sushi originated as a way of preserving fish.

== History ==
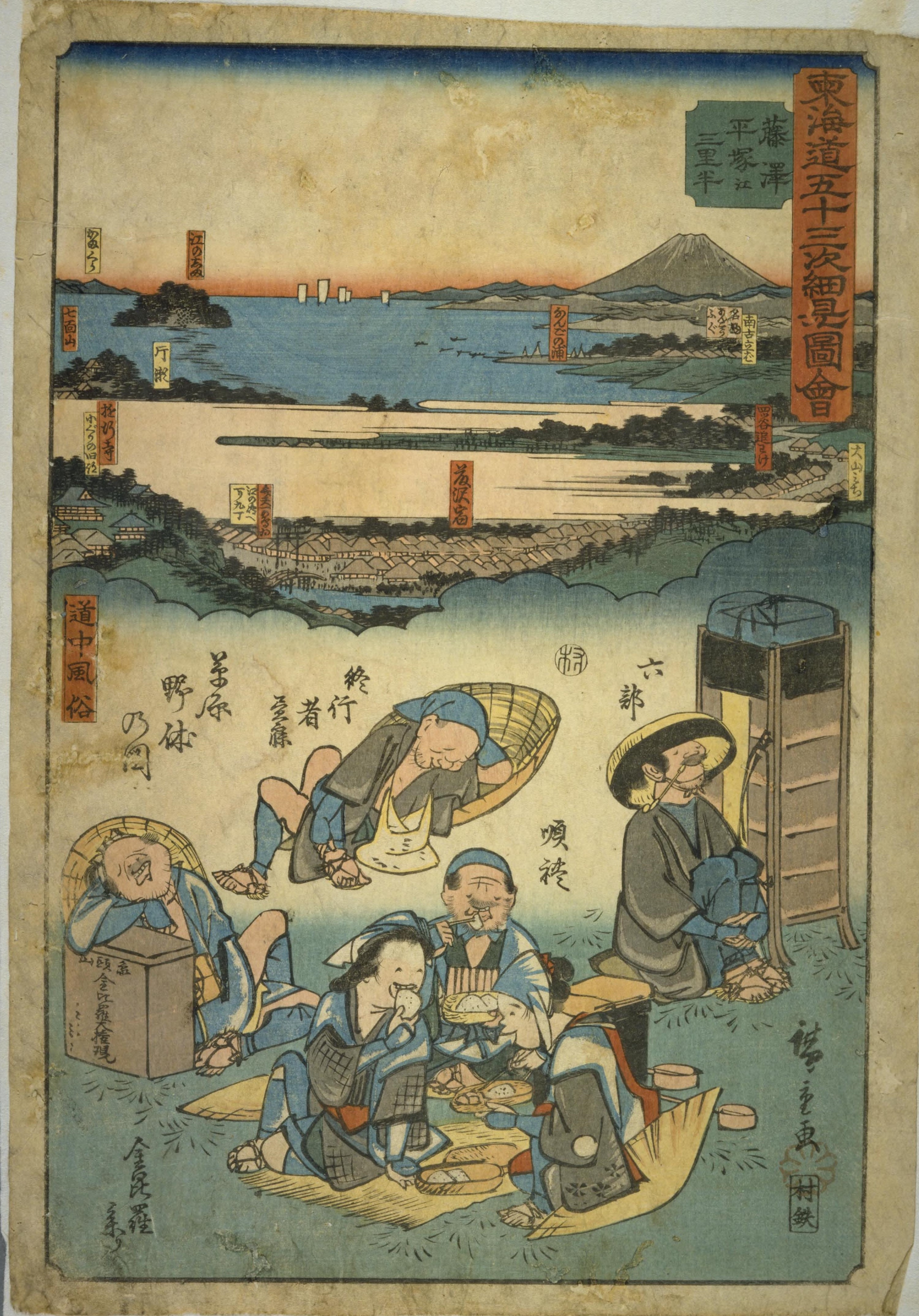
Pilgrims eating onigiri, print by Hiroshige, 1845

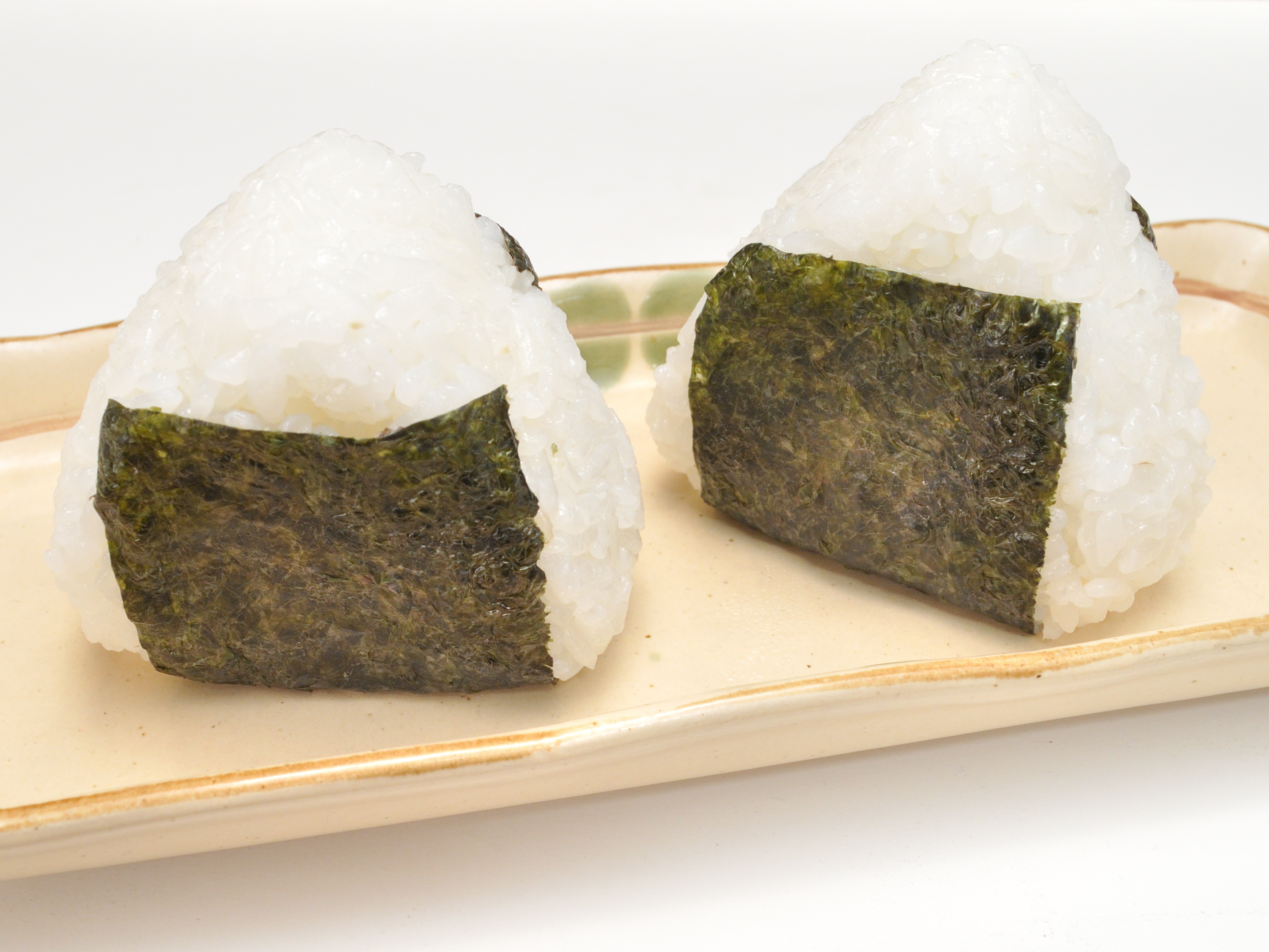
Onigiri wrapped in nori

=== Prehistoric ===
On November 12, 1987, lumps of carbonized grains of rice, thought to be riceballs, were excavated from a building belonging to the Yayoi period (2000 years ago) in the Sugitani Chanobatake Ruins in Ishikawa Prefecture. The carbonized rice had traces which revealed that it was formed by human hands, thus it was initially documented as "the oldest onigiri." In subsequent research, it was thought to be steamed and grilled, rather than boiled like today's rice, similar to another dish called chimaki. Since then, it has been academically called the "chimaki-shaped carbonized rice lumps (チマキ状炭化米塊)".

In Nakanoto, there is a replica of the relic on display at the roadside station Orihime-no-sato Nakanoto.

=== Pre-modern ===
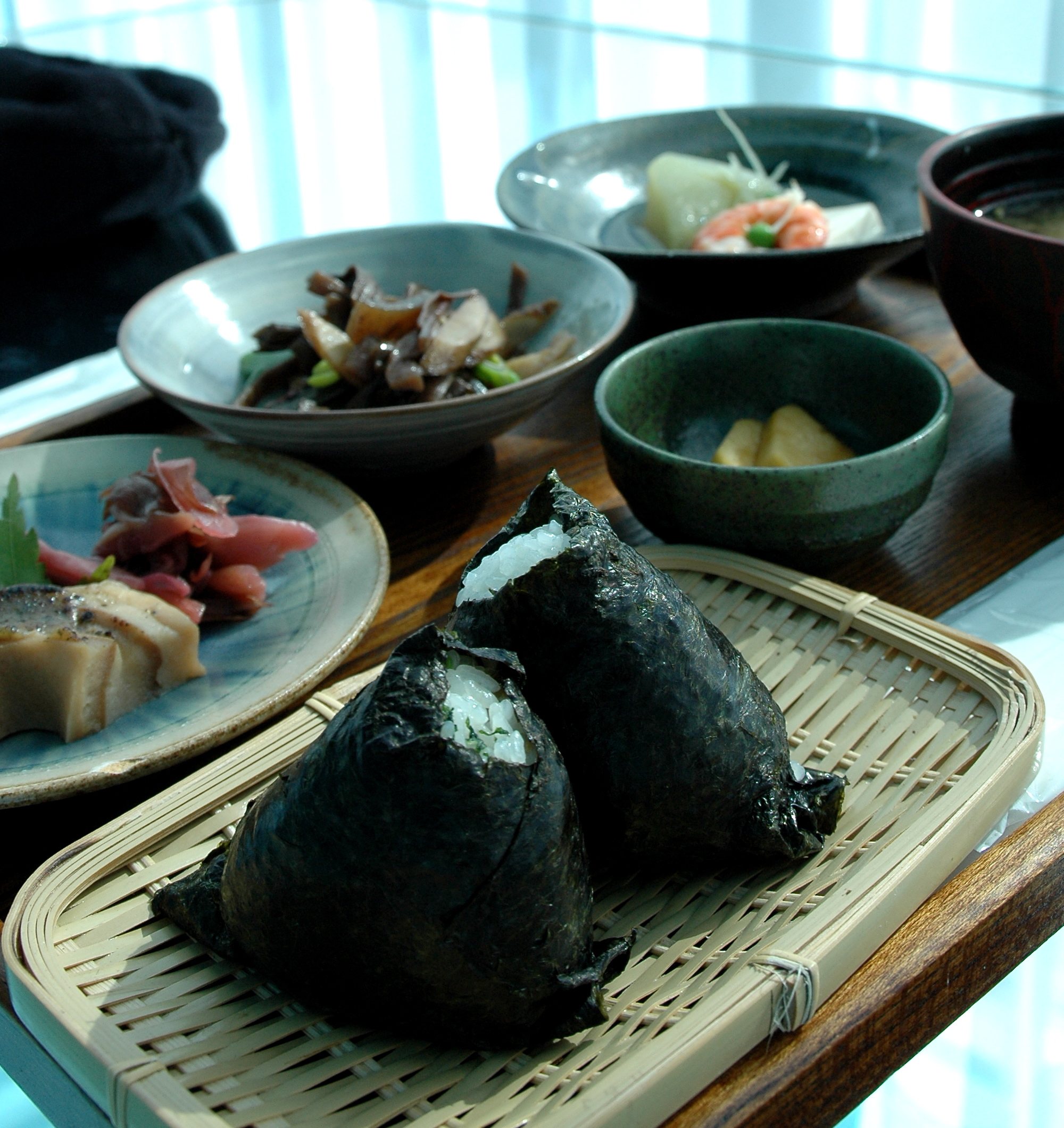
Onigiri as part of a meal

Before the use of chopsticks became widespread, in the Nara period, rice was often rolled into a small ball so that it could be easily picked up. In the Heian period, rice was made into small rectangular shapes known as tonjiki so that they could be piled onto a plate and easily eaten. At that time, onigiri were called tonjiki and often consumed at outdoor picnic lunches.

The first incarnation of the word onigiri is attested in the Hitachi no Kuni Fudoki (Hitachi Province Gazette), dated to 721 AD. In it, the word used is nigiri-ihi (握飯) or "crumpled rice":

Kanbun-notated text	〈風俗說云_{二}握飯筑波之國_{一}。〉
Old Japanese	〈握飯(にぎりいひ) 筑波の国(つくはのくに)、風俗(くにぶり)の説(ことば)に云(い)ふ。〉 Nigiri-ihi Tsukuba no kuni, kuniburi no kotoba-ni ifu. ("In the Tsukuba (Note: "Tsukuba" here refers to Tsukuba District south of Hitachi Province.) dialect, it is known as nigiri-ihi.")

In Murasaki Shikibu's 11th-century diary Murasaki Shikibu Nikki, she writes of people eating tonjiki rice balls. Other writings, dating back as far as the seventeenth century, state that many samurai stored rice balls wrapped in bamboo sheath as a quick lunchtime meal during war.

From the Kamakura period to the early Edo period, onigiri was used as a quick meal. This made sense as cooks simply had to think about making enough onigiri and did not have to concern themselves with serving. These onigiri were simply balls of rice flavored with salt. Nori did not become widely available until the Genroku era (1688–1704) of the mid-Edo period, when the farming of nori and fashioning it into sheets became widespread.

=== Modern ===
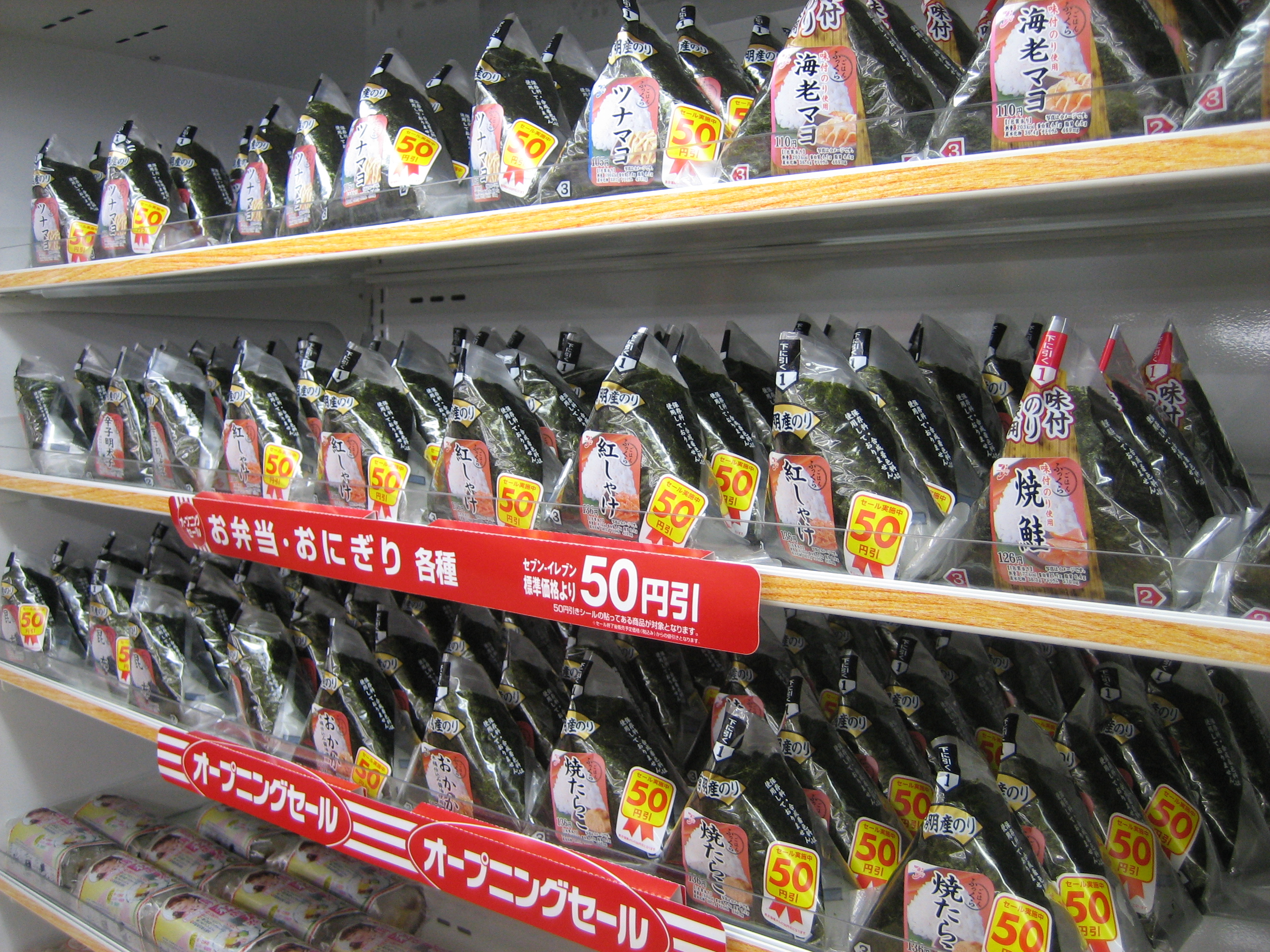
Onigiri sold at a Japanese 7-Eleven

In the 1980s, a machine to make triangular onigiri was invented. Rather than rolling the filling inside, the flavoring was put into a hole in the onigiri and the hole was hidden by nori. Since the onigiri made by this machine came with nori already applied to the rice ball, over time the nori became moist and sticky, clinging to the rice.

A packaging improvement allowed the nori to be stored separately from the rice. Before eating, the diner could open the packet of nori and wrap the onigiri. The use of a hole for filling the onigiri made new flavors of onigiri easier to produce as this cooking process did not require changes from ingredient to ingredient. Modern mechanically wrapped onigiri are specially folded so that the plastic wrapping is between the nori and rice to act as a moisture barrier. When the packaging is pulled open at both ends, the nori and rice come into contact and are eaten together. This packaging is commonly found for both triangular onigiri and rolls (細巻き).

== Rice and shapes ==
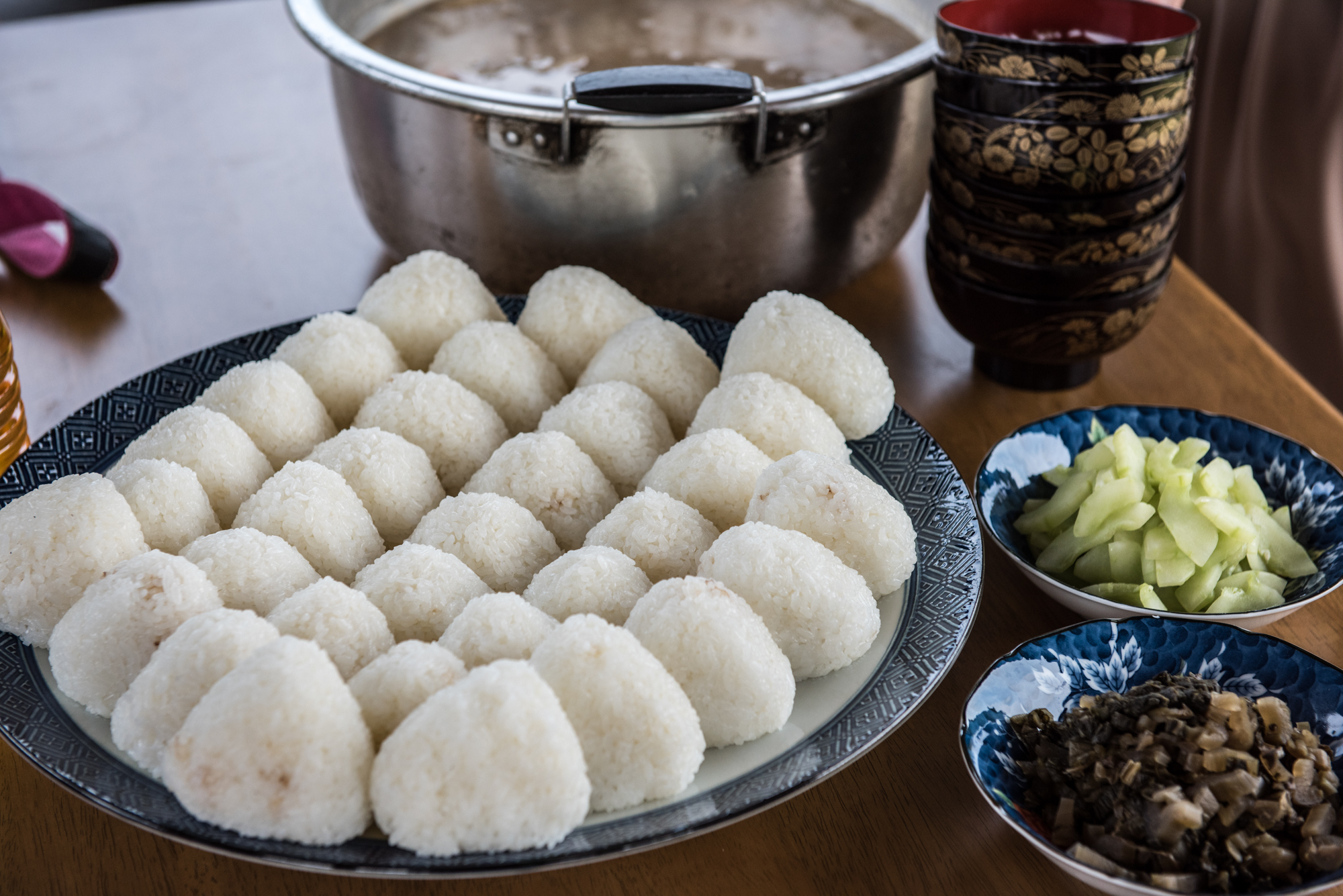
Shio-musubi, or plain rice balls made only with salt, with no filling

Usually, onigiri is made with boiled white rice, though it is sometimes made with different varieties of cooked rice, such as:

- Okowa or kowa-meshi: glutinous rice cooked or steamed with vegetables
- Sekihan: rice cooked with red azuki beans
- Maze-gohan: rice cooked with various preferred ingredients
- Fried rice
- Brown rice

The rice may be seasoned with salt, sesame, furikake, dried shiso flakes, and so on. Onigiri are typically triangular, but can come in other shapes, including round, cylindrical.

== Fillings ==
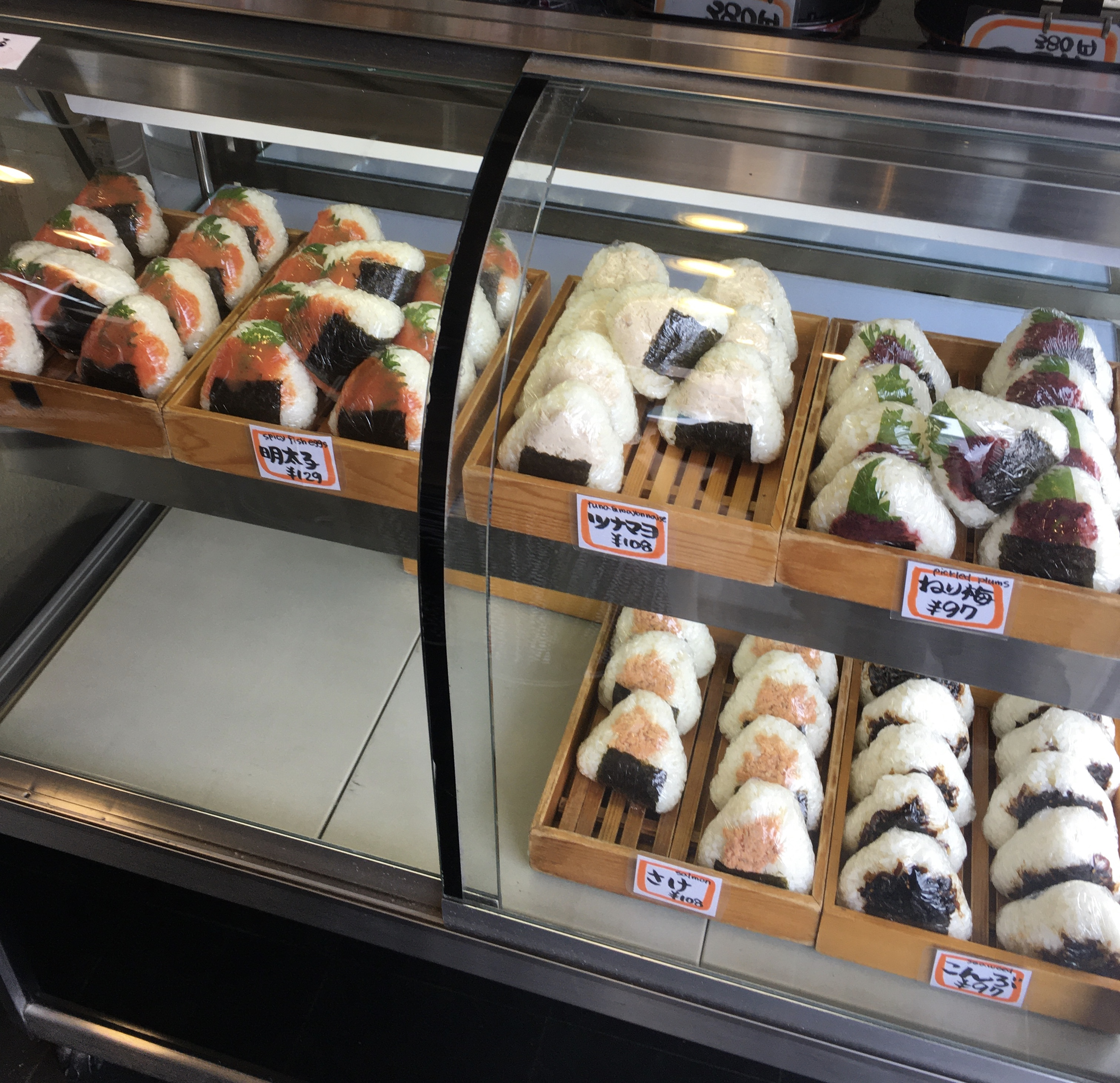
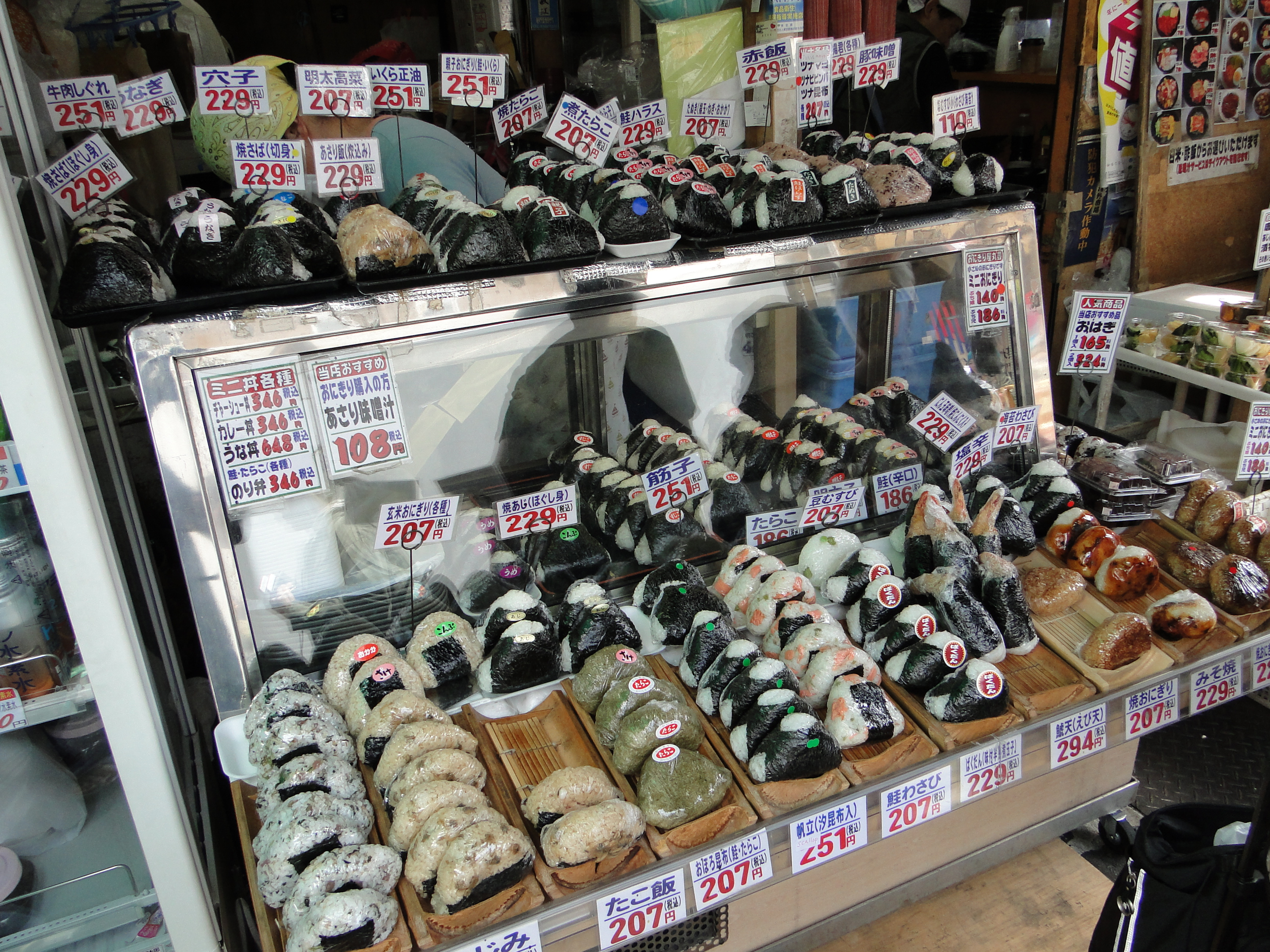
Stores selling onigiri of various flavors and fillings

Umeboshi, katsuobushi, salmon, kombu and fish roe are common fillings for onigiri. Other fillings are pickled vegetables, seasoned seafood and meat. The fillings can be anything from fish to vegetables, and there are many different types of onigiri that already come ready-made with various fillings.

Typical fillings are listed below:

- Dressed dishes: tuna with mayonnaise (シーチキン), shrimp with mayonnaise, negitoro (ネギトロ), etc.
- Dried fish: roasted and crumbled mackerel (鯖), Japanese horse mackerel (鰺), etc.
- Dried food: katsuobushi, etc.
- Fish roe: mentaiko (明太子), tarako (たらこ), tobiko (とびこ), etc.
- Shiokara: squid, shuto, etc.
- Meats: kakuni, dongpo pork, char siu
- Tsukudani: nori, Hypoptychus dybowskii (小女子), Venerupis philippinarum (浅蜊), etc.
- Pickled fruits and vegetables: umeboshi, takana, nozawana, etc.
- Tenkasu: deep fried bits of batter

== Variants ==
=== Yaki-onigiri ===
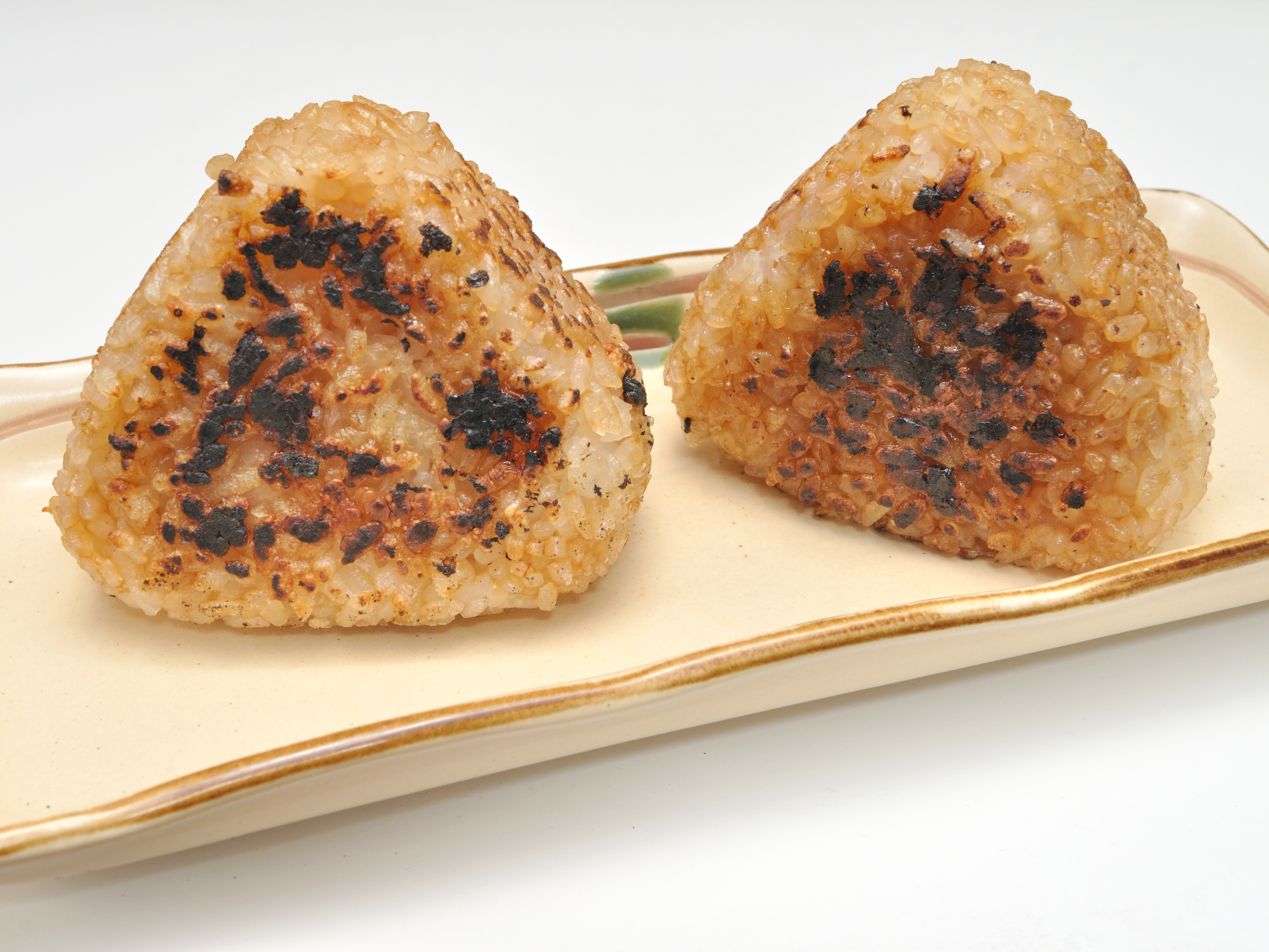
Yaki-onigiri, grilled until sides are brown

Yaki-onigiri (焼きおにぎり "grilled onigiri") are first shaped by compacting white rice, then grilling it until brown, then coating with soy sauce or miso, and finally broiling it. Yaki-onigiri is also sold commercially as frozen food.

Miso-onigiri (味噌おにぎり) is mainly in eastern Japan. Miso is used as filling, sometimes mixed with green onion, or spread over and roasted as a variant of yaki-onigiri.

=== Age-onigiri ===
Age-onigiri (揚げおにぎり "fried onigiri") are first shaped by compacting white rice, then frying it in a frying pan or wok using cooking oil until it is golden brown. Because of the oil, the flavor is richer than yaki-onigiri. If eating it as is, it can be seasoned with soy sauce, miso, or salt.

To eat it in a soup, first place it in a bowl. Add condiments such as chives, miyakogusa, wasabi, grated ginger, nori, umeboshi plum, and pour hot Japanese-style soup stock. Eat while breaking up the onigiri that have absorbed the soup stock.

There are several variations of the age-onigiri. For example, there is a version where the rice being fried has Japanese flavoring, such as takikomi gohan. There is also a Western style variation where melted cheese is used as the filling, the rice is deep-fried with western ingredients such as ketchup and curry, and the onigiri is topped with a western-style soup.

=== Bakudan-onigiri ===
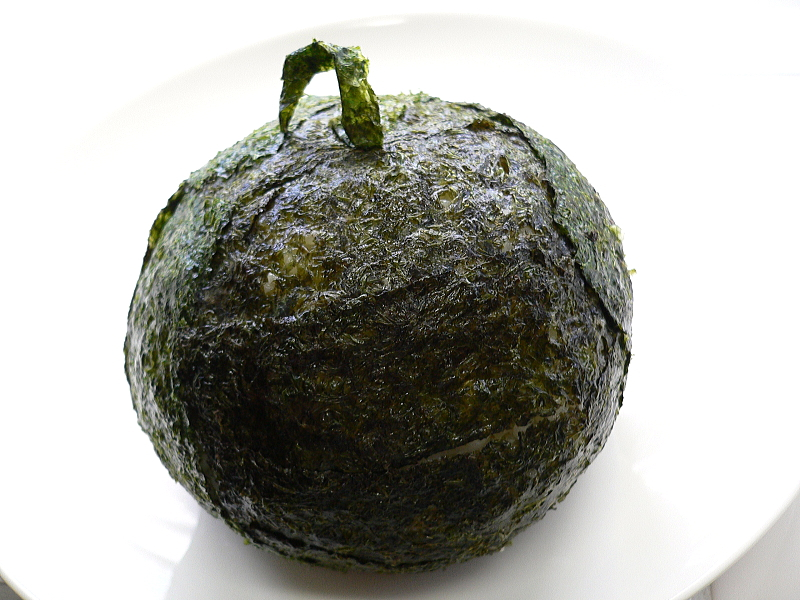
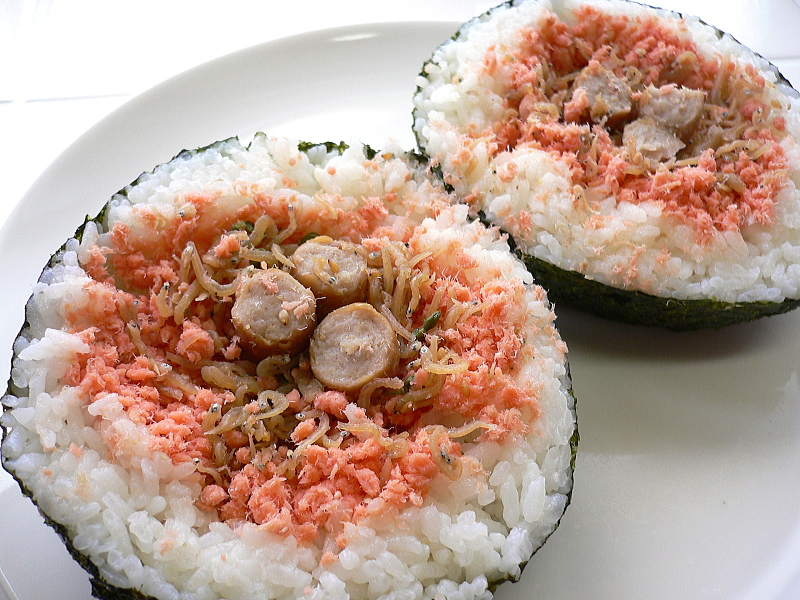
Bakudan-onigiri are round, extra large onigiri fully wrapped in nori

Bakudan-onigiri (爆弾おにぎり "bomb-shaped onigiri") are large, spherical rice balls wrapped entirely in nori, so that no rice is exposed. Like other onigiri, they are usually filled with dried fish and umeboshi plums. Bakudan-onigiri are known to be simple to make and easy to hold without getting the hands sticky.

=== Pork tamago-onigiri ===
Pork tamago-onigiri (ポーク玉子おにぎり "pork egg onigiri") or onipō (おにポー) for short, is a variation from Okinawa Prefecture which combines rice, seaweed, pork, and eggs. It is similar to onigirazu (rice and lunch meat in sandwich form).

=== Onigirazu ===
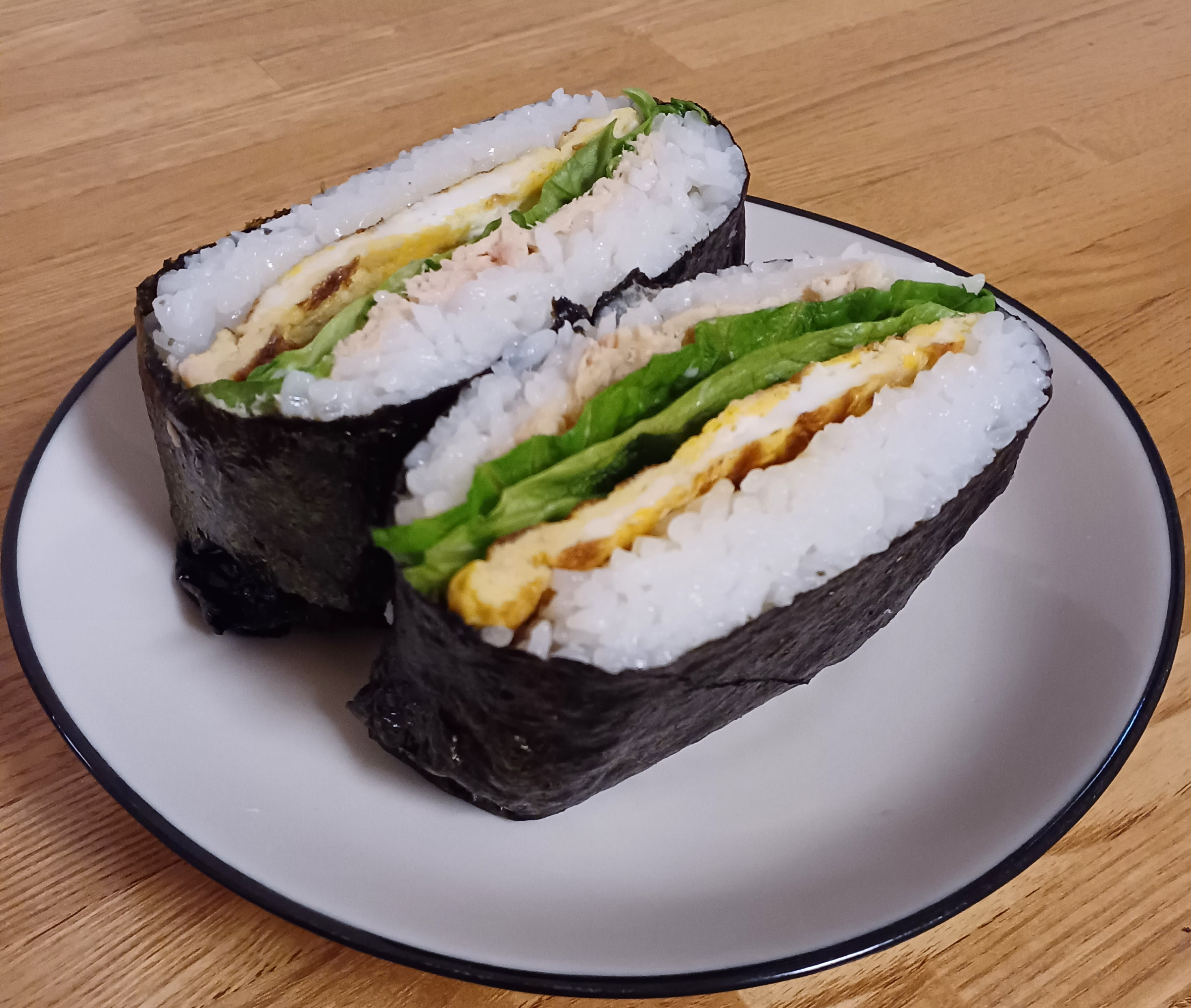
Two halves of an onigirazu with egg, lettuce and tuna filling

Onigirazu (おにぎらず) is a type of onigiri that is not made by shaping a triangle by hand, but rather by folding a square piece of nori over the rice and filling. The name onigirazu is a play on "onigiri", which comes from the nigiru (握る) verb, meaning to press into shape; nigirazu is a negative form of the verb, (Note: A more common negative conjugation would be nigiranai, whereas the -zu ending is a more formal conjugation.) so the dish is literally a "not pressed into shape" or "not-onigiri".

The recipe was first published in a Cooking Papa manga from the early 1990s, but it experienced a revival in its popularity online from late 2014 through 2015. In an interview, Cooking Papa's mangaka, Tochi Ueyama, expressed surprise at the recent popularity given the dish's simplicity, and shared the story behind its creation:

あれはうちのかあちゃん（妻）が考えたんですよ。炊きたてのごはんでパパッと作っているのを見て、「それいいね、描かせてよ」と。「おにぎらず」という名前だけは自分でつけたんです。
My wife came up with that. I saw her quickly preparing it with freshly cooked rice and said "that's good, let me draw it". The name, "onigirazu", I came up with by myself.

During its surge in popularity, a wide variety of different recipes for onigirazu were shared online, including fillings of meat, fish, fried or boiled eggs, Spam, cream cheese and vegetables. Many also saw vegetable onigirazu with a reduced amount of rice as a dieting strategy.

=== Other ===
- Tenmusu (天むす): rice balls containing fried tempura. Originally from Tsu, Mie, and is well known in Nagoya cuisine.
- Samgak-gimbap (삼각김밥) — Literally "triangle gimbap". It originates from Japanese onigiri and is sold in convenience stores in South Korea. Fillings vary greatly; the expiration date is one day; it typically provides between 600 and 850 kilojoules (140 and 200 kcal) of food energy.

== In popular culture ==
Tokyo's Takagi Shrine is often called the onigiri shrine. It is a Shinto shrine dedicated to "Takami-Musubi, an androgynous deity of creation and birth ... the shrine is associated with the concept of en-musubi, as well as ... rice balls." Before 1868, the shrine was dedicated to Dairoku-Tenma-Ō, the "Devil King of the Sixth Heaven", and was called Dairokutensha.

== See also ==
- Arancini – an Italian dish of fried, breadcrumb-coated rice balls, with various fillings
- Cifantuan – Shanghainese rice balls, commonly eaten for breakfast
- Jumeokbap – a Korean dish of Japanese onigiri-styled rice balls, with various fillings
- Lemper – an Indonesian glutinous rice dish served with abon fillings wrapped in banana leaves
- Onigiri senbei
- Zongzi – a Chinese glutinous rice dish served with various fillings wrapped in bamboo or reed leaves
