= Jumeok-bap =

Korean rice balls

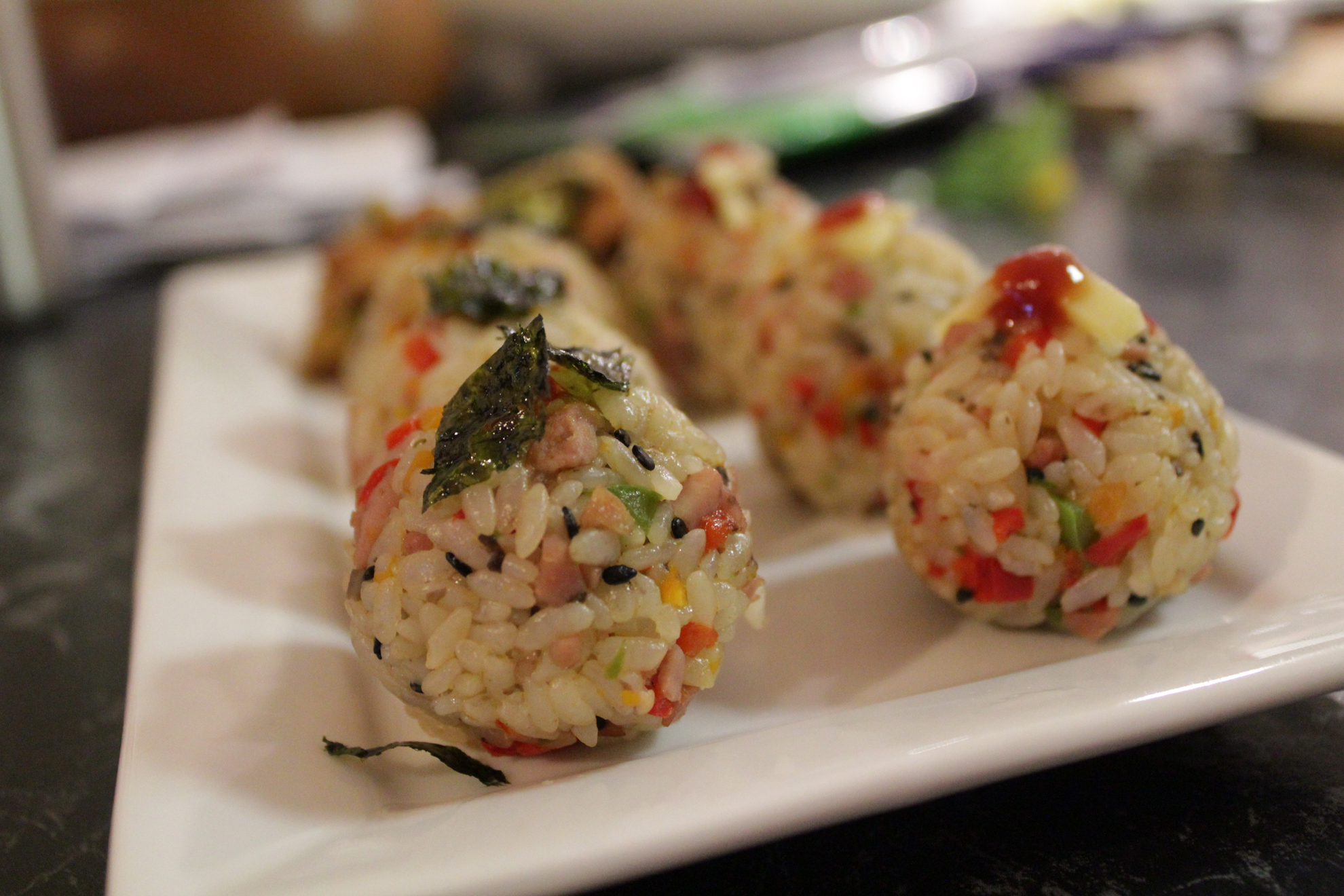
- Type: Rice balls
- Place of origin: Japan (origin); Korea (adaptation)
- Main ingredients: Bap (cooked rice)
- Similar dishes: Arancini, cifantuan, onigiri, zongzi

Korean name
- Hangul: 주먹밥
- Lit.: fist rice
- RR: jumeokbap
- MR: chumŏkpap
- IPA: [tɕu.mʌk̚.p͈ap̚]

Jumeok-bap (Korean: 주먹밥; lit. 'fist rice'), sometimes jumeokbap, is a Korean rice dish made from a lump of cooked rice made into a round loaf in the shape of a fist. Rice balls are a common item in dosirak (a packed meal) and often eaten as a light meal, between-meal snack, street food, or an accompaniment to spicy food. The commercialization of Jumeok-bap began in earnest in 1990, when Japanese cuisine gradually spread to Korea and onigiri were popularized. Although it did not receive special attention in the early years, it gained popularity as an inexpensive, easy-to-prepare food during the 1997 Asian financial crisis. In the 2010s, a variety of forms of Jumeok-bap were released, including a round-shaped onigiri and a rice burger in the shape of a hamburger.

== Summary ==
The detailed history of when and where rice balls began is unknown, as it is an easy and simple food that only needs to be lumped together by hand. It is likely that it is a natural-looking dish like convergent evolution since humans began eating rice. In Japan, for example, it is speculated that similar food came out around the same time in Korea, given that traces related to the food that clumped rice were excavated from the remains of the Yayoi period (B.C 1,000 ~ A.D 300).

There is a record that woodworkers made rice balls with beans and sesame in their lunch boxes in literary works of the Joseon Dynasty, and boiled beans to make a half (裹飯, stacked rice) in the Annals of the Joseon Dynasty. In addition, in Buddhist scriptures, fasting (摶食) is the food eaten by monks, which means rice balls, which are eaten by hand, in addition to the meaning of food in terms of materials and shapes that humans eat.

Rice balls are easy to prepare and carry, thus making for excellent food for long-distance travel, or on military campaigns when cooking is a challenge. During the Korean War, soldiers receive rice balls as rations, but civilians also relied on rice balls as emergency food. Therefore, every year on days leading up until June 25, events were held nationwide inviting everyone to participate in making rice balls to remember the hardships of the past. During the Gwangju Uprising, when the protesters-turned-militia ran out of food, citizens volunteered to make and supply rice balls for them; rice balls are now a symbol of Gwangju, and similar events were held every year on days leading up to May 18.

In North Korea, rice balls are called jwegi-bap (줴기밥), and it is used in both Kim Jong Il and Kim Jong Un propaganda, where they were depicted eating a meagre meal while serving the people. For the latter however, it became a subject of satire among the local population.

== Gallery ==
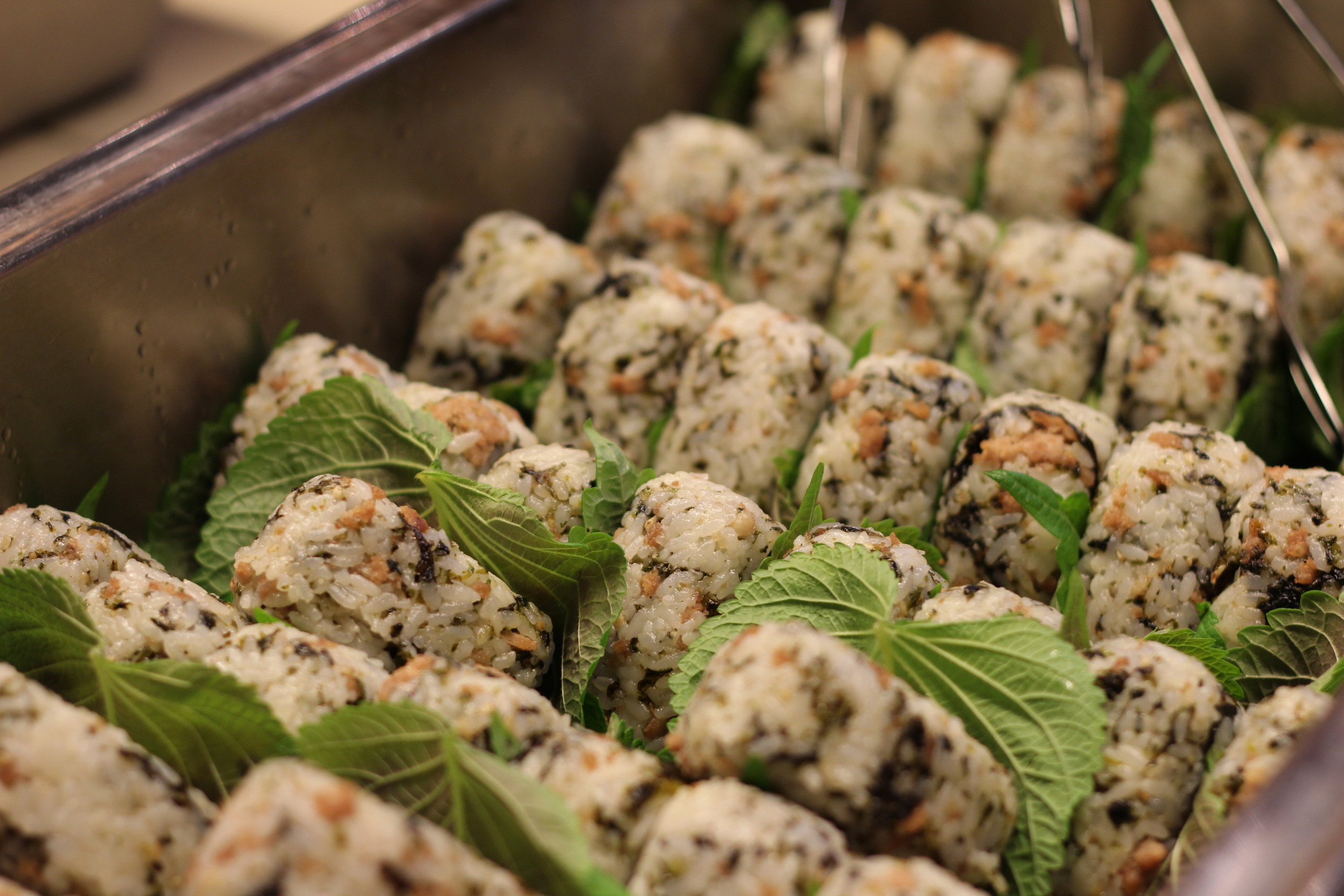

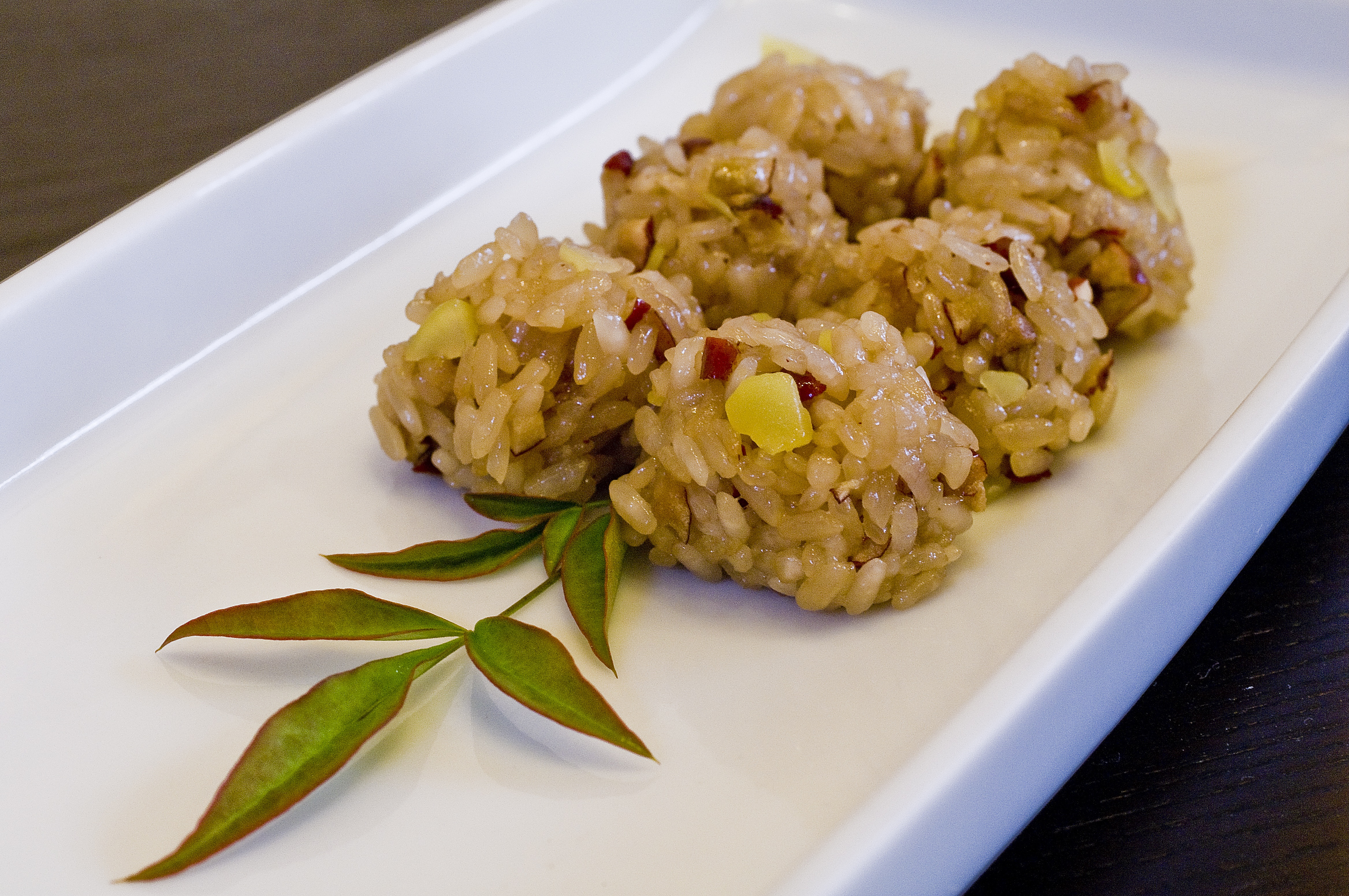

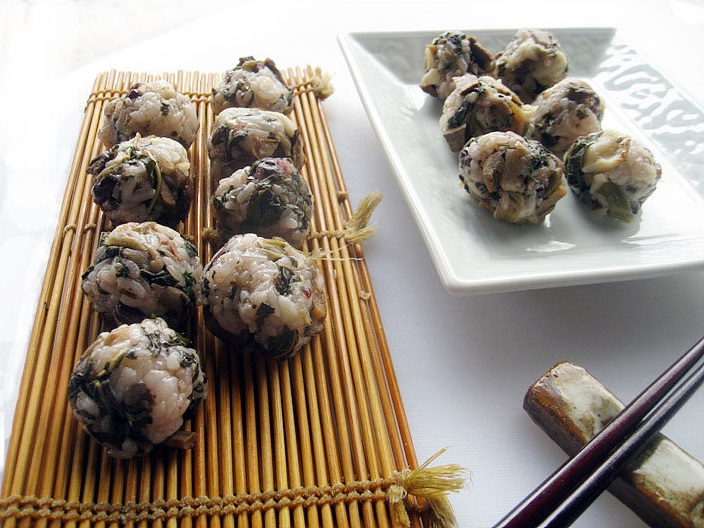

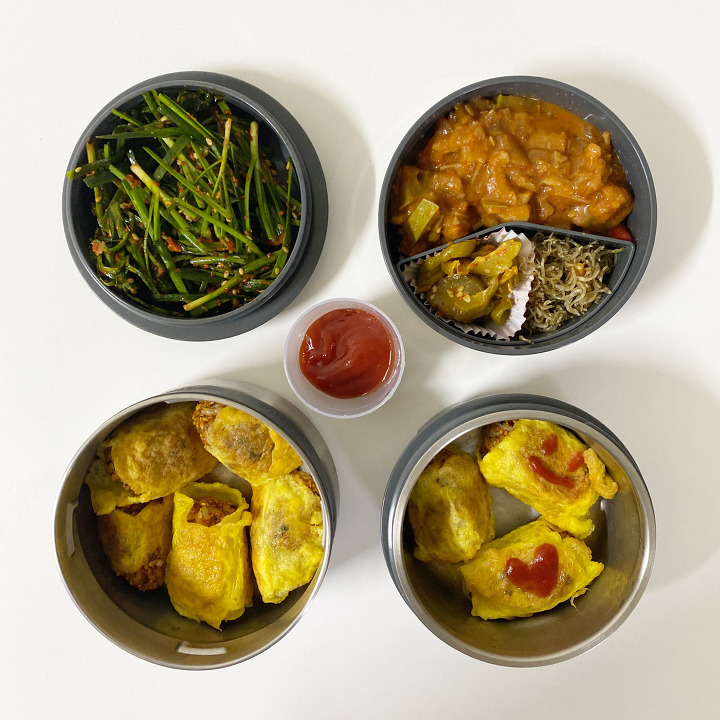
Packed in dosirak
