= Eric Sze =

Taiwanese chef and restauranteur

- Occupations: Chef, restaurateur
- Known for: 886, Wenwen

Eric Sze is a Taiwanese chef and restaurateur based in New York City. Alongside Andy Chuang, he co-founded the Taiwanese restaurants 886 and Wenwen in New York City. In 2021, he and Chuang were named to the Forbes 30 Under 30 for Food and Drink.

== Early life and education ==
Sze was born in Taipei, Taiwan in 1993. In 2011, he moved to the United States and studied hospitality at New York University.

== Career ==
=== Scallion Foods ===
Prior to his own ventures, Sze had never worked in a restaurant other than a brief internship at Momofuku. During college, he created a food startup called Scallion Foods which sold "direct-to-consumer prepackaged beef noodle soup kits" right out of his apartment, "which was very illegal, but people liked it, and it was fun."

=== Restaurants ===
After a skiing accident rendered Sze bedridden and unable to deliver food, an acquaintance told him to look into the possibility of opening a noodle shop in East Village, Manhattan, which led him to co-found Tang.

In 2018, after selling his shares in Tang, Sze and Chuang, his business partner, opened 886, a Taiwanese restaurant also in East Village known for its fun, laidback vibes. In 2022, they opened Wenwen, a Taiwanese restaurant in Greenpoint, Brooklyn. Sze named Wenwen after two important women in his life: his mother, Wenchi, and his wife, Wenhui.

In 2023, Sze collaborated with Dominique Ansel on a Lunar New Year special: "a French-style shaobing pork belly sandwich, with a peanut rice milk drink."

=== Initiatives ===
During the COVID-19 pandemic, Sze made thousands of bento boxes for healthcare workers and local institutions. Sze also founded Enough is Enough, an initiative to spread awareness about anti-Asian racism in the United States. It hosted virtual cooking events and fundraised on behalf of Black, Brown, and Asian shelters.
