= 886 (restaurant) =

Taiwanese restaurant in Manhattan, New York

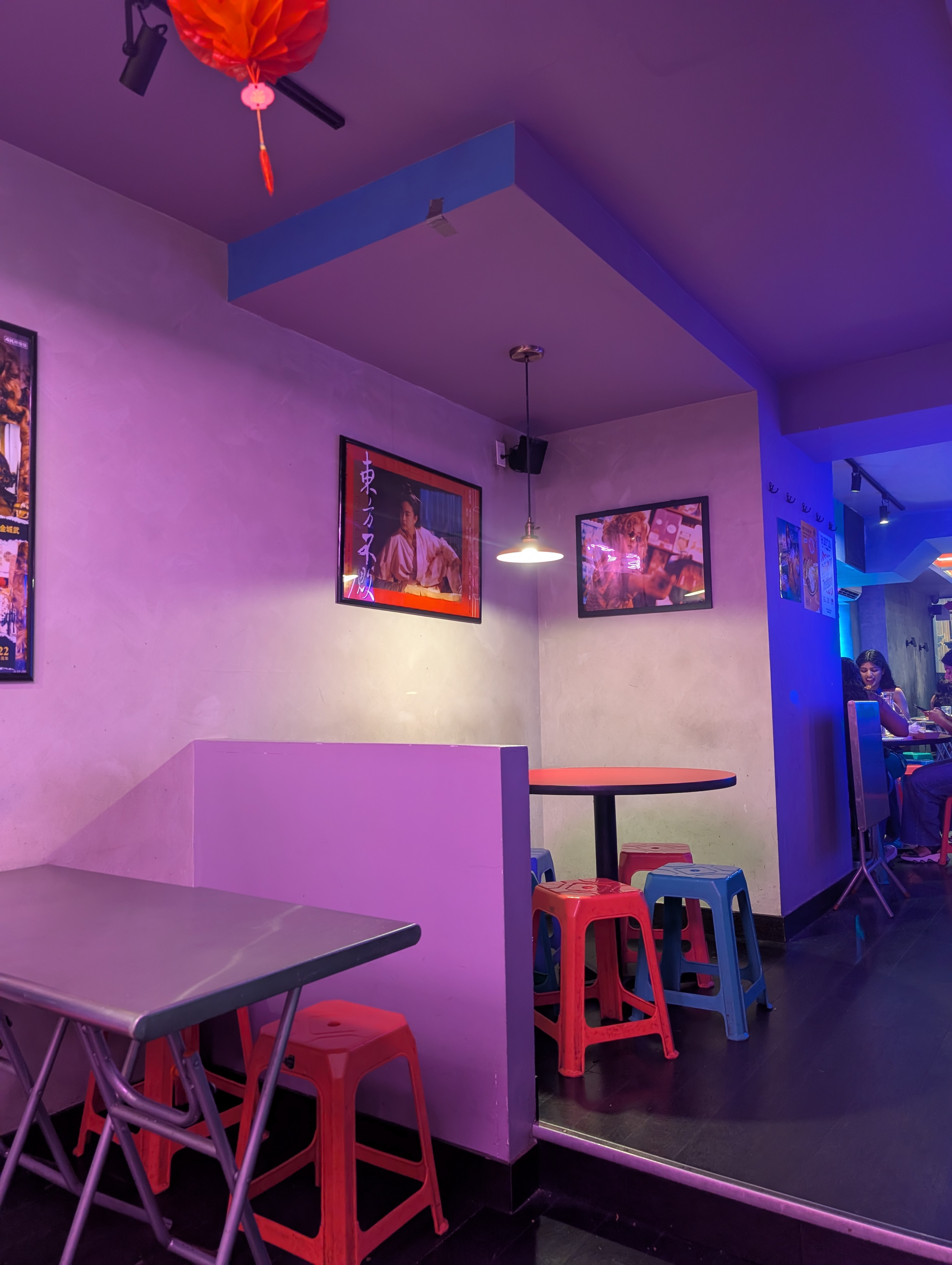
- The interior of 886
- Interactive map of 886

Restaurant information
- Location: 26 St. Marks Place, New York City, New York, United States
- Coordinates: 40.72885°N 73.98868°W

886 was a Taiwanese restaurant in the East Village of Manhattan in New York City. Named after Taiwan's calling code, it was known for its "clubby vibe" paired with traditional Taiwanese cuisine. Some of its dishes included the "sausage party," or a "small sausage in large sausage," and a gourmet take on the Taiwanese McDonald's fried chicken sandwich.

== History ==
886 was founded by Eric Sze and Andy Chuang as a restaurant combining Taiwanese fare with "current American trends" in order to draw a "hip," younger crowd and distinguish it from the 2010s influx of Taiwanese restaurants in New York City. In particular, Sze reflected upon his experiences at izakayas, and in Koreatown, and found that there weren't many Taiwanese places where one could eat and drink. The restaurant opened on July 11, 2018.

In 2023, Dominique Ansel collaborated with Sze on a Lunar New Year special: "a French-style shaobing pork belly sandwich, with a peanut rice milk drink."

886 closed on August 31, 2026.

== Critical reception ==
Eater called 886 one of the best Taiwanese restaurants in New York City, noting that it "evokes the feeling of late-night Taiwanese hangs and serves food to match."

Time Out named it one of the best restaurants in the East Village.
