= Cathy Erway =

Food blogger, cookbook author, and freelance food author

Cathy Erway is a food blogger (Not Eating Out in New York), cookbook author, and freelance food author.

== Early life and education ==
Erway is mixed race, with Taiwanese ancestry through her mother.

A resident of Brooklyn, Erway graduated from Emerson College.

== Books ==
Her books include The Art of Eating In (2010), The Food of Taiwan (2015), and Sheet Pan Chicken (2020).

Also in 2023, Cathy Erway published Win Son Presents: A Taiwanese American Cookbook in collaboration with Josh Ku and Trigg Brown. The book was nominated for a 2024 IACP Award in the Chef and Restaurants category.

== Recognition ==
In 2018, her podcast Why We Eat What We Eat was nominated for a James Beard Award in the Podcast category.

She won the Journalism James Beard Foundation Award in 2019 in the Home Cooking category for her article "The Subtle Thrills of Cold Chicken" for Taste magazine.

In 2023, she was nominated for another James Beard Award, this time in the Columns and Newsletters category, for the articles “The Case for the Supermarket Supershopper”; “A Maximalist New Wave for Instant Noodles”; “We All Scream for Asian American Ice Cream”, which are in her column, "Shelve It", in Taste magazine. She was also nominated for a 2023 IACP Award for the column in the Recipe-Focused Column category.

== See also ==
- Taiwanese cuisine
