= Cifantuan =

Chinese glutinous rice dish

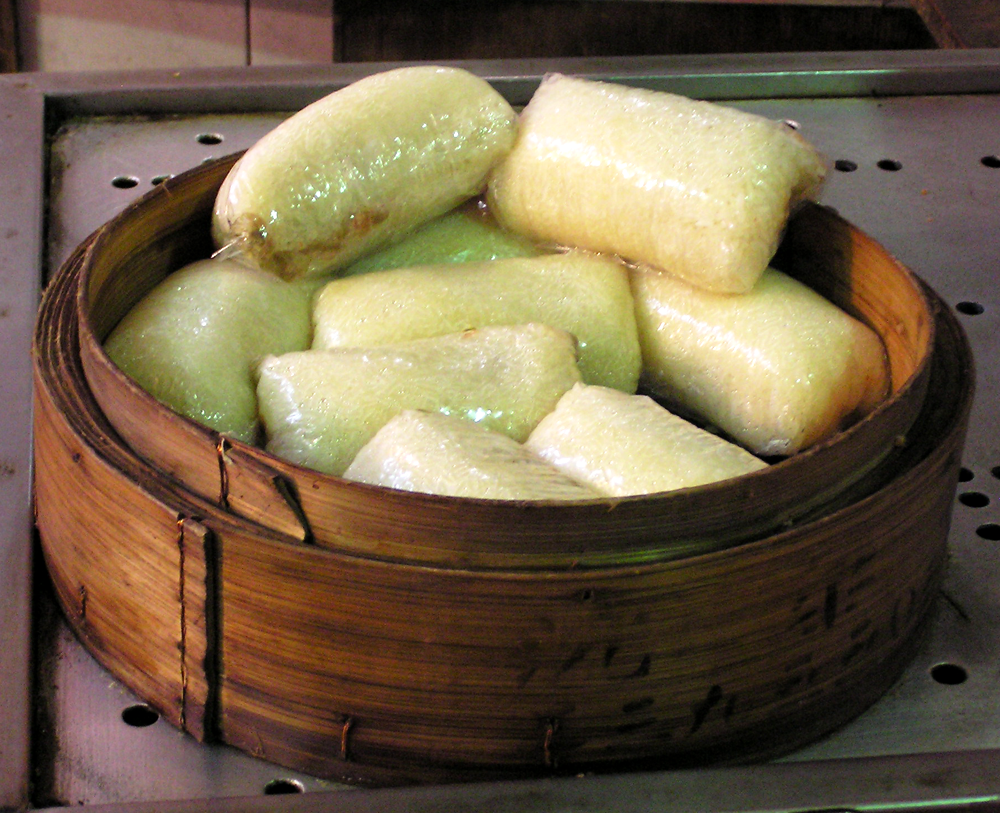
- Pieces of cifantuan in a traditional steaming basket
- Alternative names: Chi faan, fantuan
- Course: Breakfast, dim sum
- Place of origin: Jiangnan, China
- Region or state: Greater China
- Main ingredients: youtiao (fried dough), glutinous rice

Cifantuan
- Traditional Chinese: 粢飯糰 / 糍飯糰
- Simplified Chinese: 粢饭团 / 糍饭团
- Hanyu Pinyin: cífàntuán
Transcriptions
Standard Mandarin
- Hanyu Pinyin: cífàntuán
- Wade–Giles: tz'u^{2}-fan^{4}-t'uan^{2}
Yue: Cantonese
- Jyutping: ci^{1}faan^{6}tyun^{4}

Cifantuan, also known simply as chi faan or fantuan, is a glutinous rice dish in Chinese cuisine originating in the Jiangnan area of eastern China which encompasses Shanghai and surrounding regions. It is made by tightly wrapping a piece of youtiao (fried dough) with glutinous rice. It is usually eaten as breakfast together with sweetened or savory soy milk in its native Jiangnan.

Today, cifantuan is commonly available in two varieties. Whereas the "savory" variety includes ingredients such as zha cai (pickled vegetable), rousong (pork floss) and small pieces of youtiao being wrapped in the rice ball, the "sweet" variety adds sugar and sometimes sesame to the filling. There are many modern variations of the food which are made from purple rice and include fillings such as tuna, kimchi, or cheese.

Cifantuan is a major breakfast food item in Shanghai. Cifantuan is also popular in Hubei, Taiwan and Hong Kong.

== See also ==
- List of rice dishes
- Jumeok-bap, the Korean dish of Japanese onigiri-styled rice balls, with various fillings
- Lo mai gai
- Onigiri, Japanese glutinous rice dish formed into triangular or cylindrical shapes and often wrapped in nori
- Zhaliang
- Zongzi, Chinese glutinous rice dish served with various fillings wrapped in bamboo or reed leaves.
