= Packed meal =

Packed meal may refer to:

- Bento, Japanese packed meal
- Dosirak, Korean packed meal
- Packed lunch
- Tiffin, Indian packed meal
