= Tiffin =

Type of Indian breakfast

Tiffin is an Indian English word for a type of meal. It refers to a light breakfast or a light tea-time meal at about 3 p.m., consisting of typical tea-time foods. In certain parts of India, it can also refer to the midday luncheon or, in some regions of the Indian subcontinent, a between-meal snack. When used in place of the word "lunch", however, it does not necessarily mean a light meal.

== Etymology ==
In the days of the British Raj in India, tiffin was used to denote the British custom of afternoon tea that had supplanted the Indian practice of having a light meal at that hour. The word is derived from "tiffing", an English colloquial term meaning to take a little drink. By 1867 it had become naturalised among Anglo-Indians in northern British India to mean luncheon.

== Current usage ==
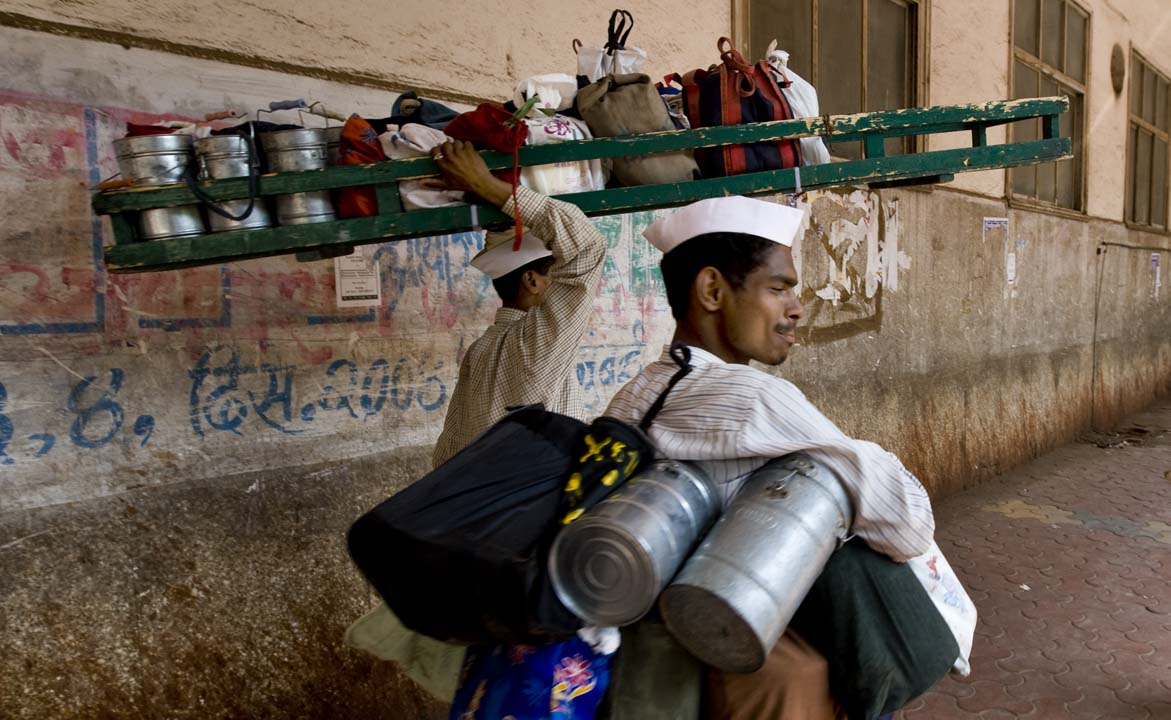
Two dabbawalas in Mumbai delivering meals packed in tiffin carriers

In South India and in Nepal, tiffin is generally breakfast or a snack between meals: dosas, idlis, vadas etc. In other parts of India, such as Mumbai, the word mostly refers to a packed lunch of some sort. In Mumbai, it is often delivered to them by dabbawalas, sometimes known as tiffin wallahs, who use a complex system to get thousands of tiffin carriers to their destinations. In most of India, a school-going child's lunch box is fondly called a tiffin box. It is also used heavily in Pakistan where people use tiffin boxes in places like offices, schools or during picnic. This practice is also common in India.

When used in place of the word "lunch", tiffin often consists of rice, lentils, curry, vegetables, chapatis or "spicy meats". In addition, the lunch boxes are themselves called tiffin carriers, tiffin-boxes or just tiffins.

== See also ==
- Bento
- Dosirak
- Lunchbox
- Tiffin carrier
- Tiffin (confectionery)
