= Gyoniku soseji =

Japanese fish sausage

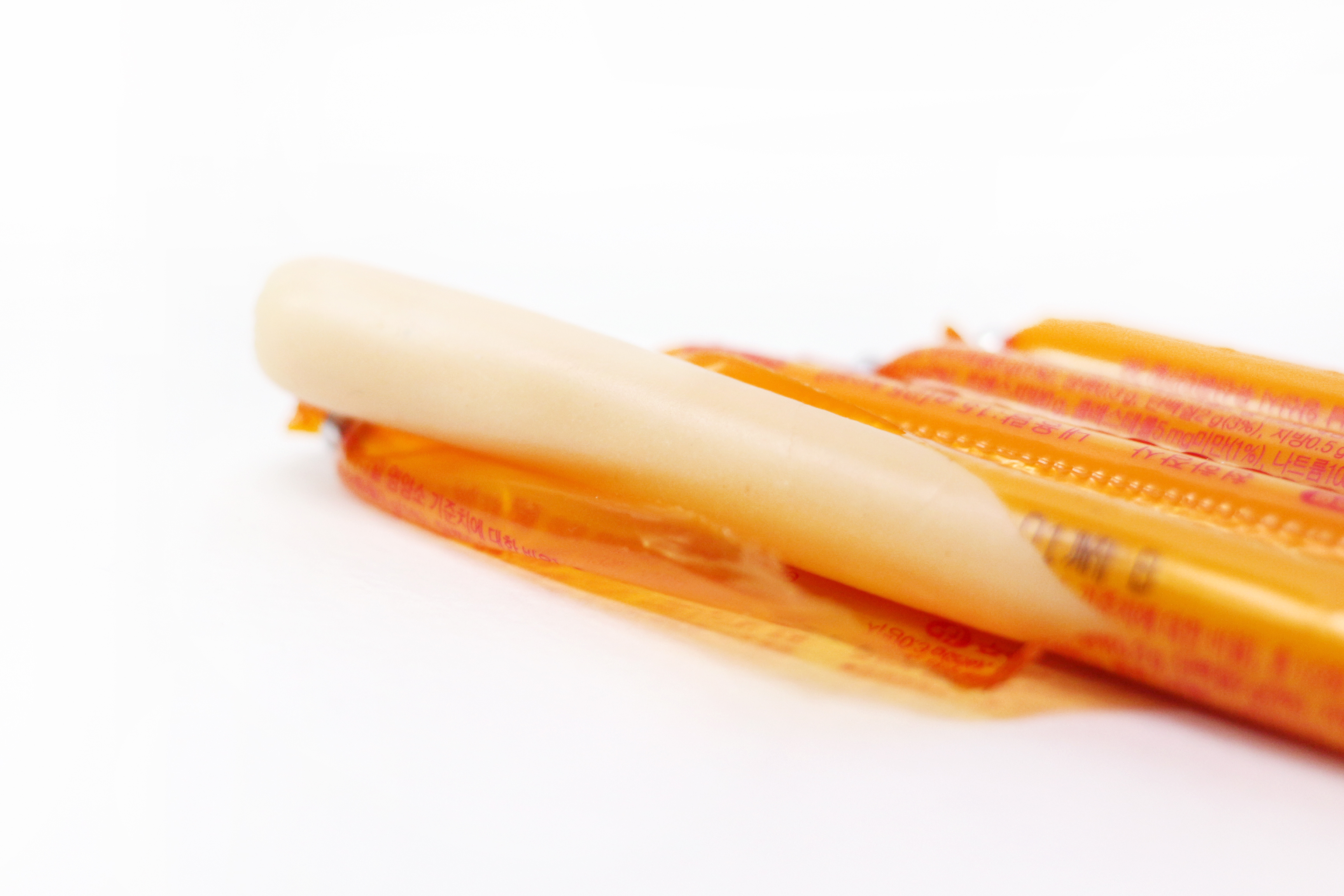
Gyoniku soseji unwrapped.

Gyoniku sausage (魚肉ソーセージ, Gyoniku sōsēji) is a Japanese fish sausage made from surimi. It is sold in a plastic casing as a snack. Gyoniku soseji is similar to the traditional fish cake, kamaboko. Gyoniku soseji and kamaboko together constitute 26% of Japanese fish consumption.

== Production ==
The industrial production of gyoniku soseji started in the 1950s as one of the early innovations for the use of excess Alaska pollock. Their manufacture benefits from the use of more types of fish meat, and a wider array of fish species or other meats.

They may contain animal fat, gelatin, wheat gluten, potato starch, salt, monosodium glutamate, sodium nitrite, phosphates, and artificial colors. They are stuffed into a plastic casing made from chlorinated rubber, vinylidene chloride, or more recently nylon film which have a distinct orange-red color to prevent discoloration in ultraviolet light. They are sealed then boiled in water at 80-90C for 50 minutes. They have a room temperature shelf life of two weeks.

=== Fish and other proteins ===
Common fishes used in their production include marlin and yellowfin tuna. Other types of fish include bigeye tuna, pollock, mackerel as well as shark, whale, or squid. Other types of meats and poultry can be used as well. A similar Nagoya product contains pork, mutton, and chicken. The fish or meats are all processed into surimi.

== History ==
The industrial production of gyoniku soseji started in the 1950s as one of the early innovations for the use of excess Alaska pollock. Their manufacture benefits from the use of more types of fish meat, and a wider array of fish species or other meats.

Seinan Kaihatsu Co., Ltd. was the first to commercially produce gyoniku soseji at a large scale in 1951. In 1965, the production of gyoniku soseji in Japan peaked at 180,000 metric tons. The production has dropped since then, but has stabilized since the 1990s at around 60,000-70,000 metric tons annually.

Gyoniku soseji was introduced in Korea in 1943 for the Japanese living there, and starting in 1963, was produced in large scale by Jin Ju Ham and became popular in the 1980s as an addition to children's dosirak lunches. CJ Foods began marketing smaller versions as snacks, and added ingredients such as corn, cheese, and other nutritional additives under the brand 'Maxbong'.

== Consumer perception and uses ==
Gyoniju soseji has a reputation as being lower in saturated fat, as well as being an alternative protein source when Bovine spongiform encephalopathy threatened beef supply. During the 2011 Tōhoku earthquake and tsunami, they served as an emergency food.

Although generally eaten as a snack, gyoniju soseji are also used in cooking; substituting for other sausage types, by being added to soups, noodle dishes, or deep fried.

In Korea, larger sausages are consumed in slices, and are generally pan-fried in an egg batter to be eaten alongside a meal or as banchan.

== See also ==
- Chikuwa
- Fishcake
