= Lunchbox =

Hand-held food container

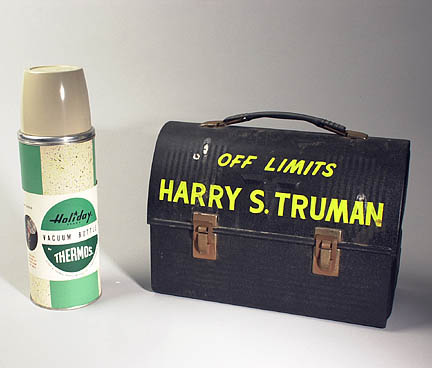
Lunch box and vacuum bottle owned by Harry S. Truman

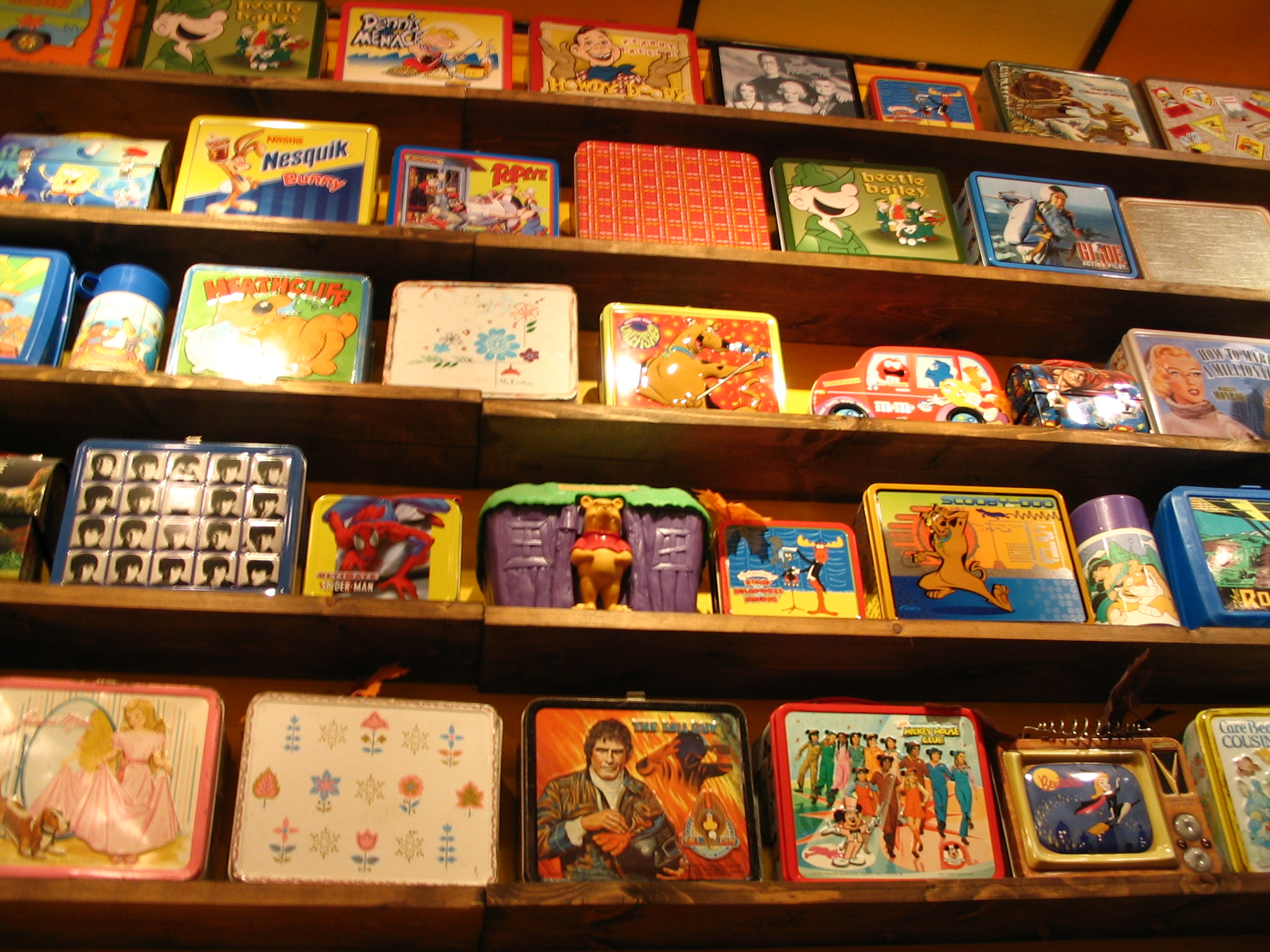
A collection of lunch boxes for school students

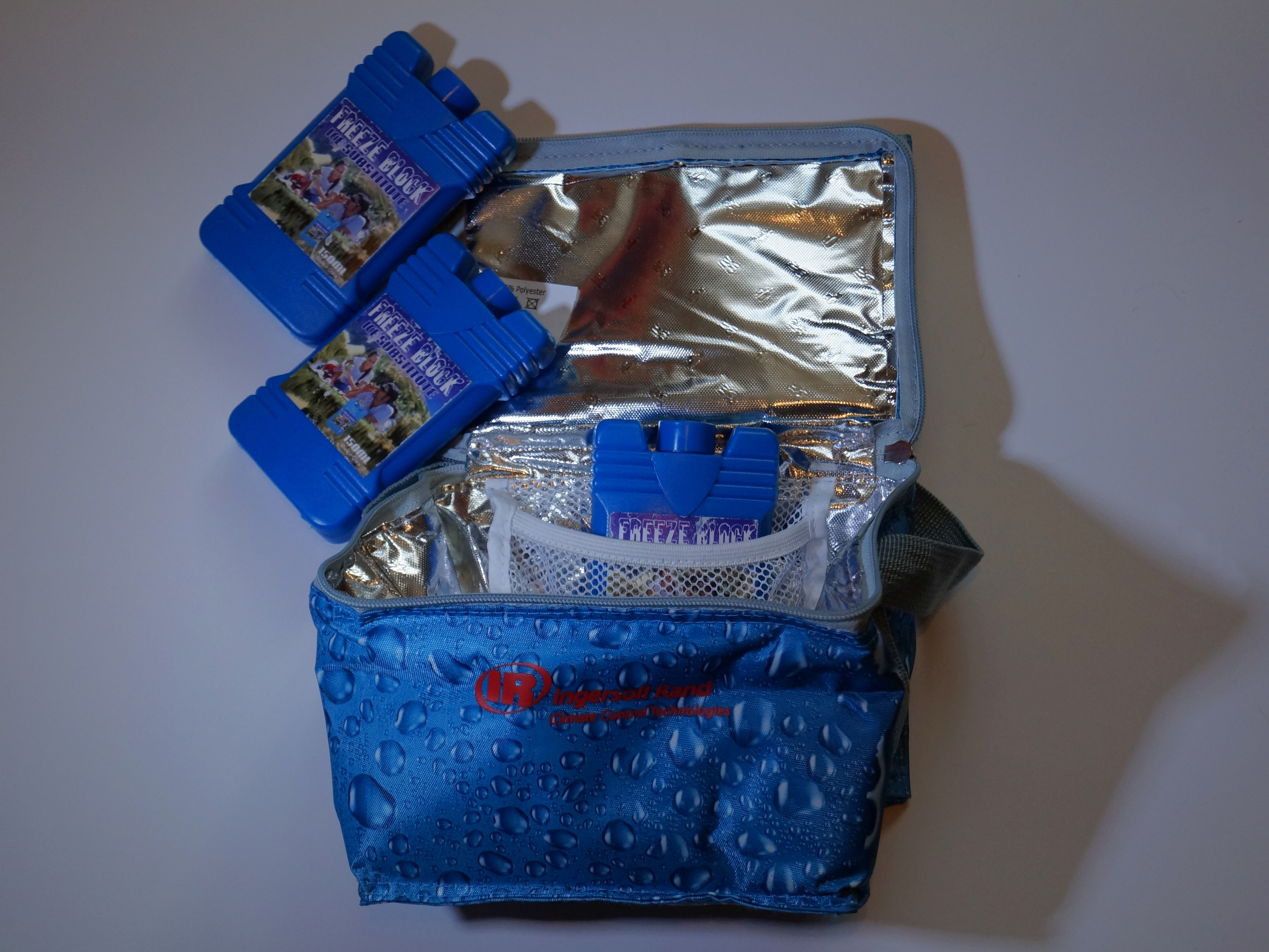
Insulated thermal bag with ice packs

A lunch box (or lunchbox) is a hand-held container used to transport food, usually to work or to school. It is commonly made of metal or plastic, is reasonably airtight and often has a handle for carrying.

== In the United States ==
In the United States a lunchbox may also be termed a lunch pail, lunch bucket, or lunch tin, either as one or two words.

The concept of a food container has existed for a long time, but it was not until people began using tobacco tins to carry meals in the early 20th century, followed by the use of lithographed images on metal, that the containers became a staple of youth, and a marketable product. It has most often been used by schoolchildren to take packed lunches, or a snack, from home to school. The most common modern form is a small case with a clasp and handle, often printed with a colorful image that can either be generic or based on children's television shows or films. Use of lithographed metal to produce lunch boxes from the 1950s through the 1980s gave way to injection-molded plastic in the 1990s.

A lunch kit comprises the actual "box" and a matching vacuum bottle. However, popular culture has more often embraced the singular term lunch box, which is now most commonly used.

With increasing industrialization resulting in Americans working outside the home in factories, it became unfeasible to go home to lunch every day, thus it was necessary to have something to protect and transport a meal. Since the 19th century, American industrial workers have used sturdy containers to hold hardy lunches, consisting of foods such as hard-boiled eggs, vegetables, meat, coffee, and pie. David Shayt, curator of the Smithsonian National Museum of American History, states that "Some of our earliest examples, from the 19th century, were woven baskets with handles. A meal would be wrapped in a handkerchief. Depending on your station, a fancy wooden box would be used by the wealthy." Tinplate boxes and recycled biscuit tins commonly were used in the early 1800s, and fitted metal pails and boxes began to appear around the 1850s. Patents started to appear for lunchbox inventions in the 1860s.

Vacuum bottles, which enabled hot or cold beverages to remain at optimal temperature until lunchtime, became a common component of the lunch box. In 1920, The American Thermos Bottle Co. produced "the first metal lunch box for kids" to aid selling their vacuum bottles.

=== Decorated ===
The first lunch box decorated with a famous licensed character was introduced in 1935. Produced by Geuder, Paeschke & Frey, it featured Mickey Mouse, and was a four-color lithographed oval tin, with a pull-out tray inside. It had no vacuum bottle, but did have a handle.

In 1950, Aladdin Industries created the first children's lunch box based on a television show, Hopalong Cassidy. The Hopalong Cassidy lunch kit, or "Hoppy", quickly became Aladdin's cash cow. Debuting in time for back-to-school 1950, it would go on to sell 600,000 units in its first year alone, each at US$2.39. In 1953, Roy Rogers and Dale Evans were featured on models introduced by American Thermos.

Over 450 decorated models quickly followed, and more than 120 million metal lunch boxes were sold between 1950 and 1970, often accompanied by a Thermos, initially made of metal and glass, and later plastic.

Lunch boxes have been manufactured using various materials. Typically, children's school lunch boxes are made of plastic or vinyl, while adult workers' lunch boxes are commonly made of metal, such as tin or aluminium, due to the greater need for durability. The aluminium variant was invented in 1954 by Leo May, a miner in Sudbury, Ontario, after he accidentally crushed his tin lunch box.

Manufacturers grew to include ADCO Liberty, Kruger Manufacturing Company, Landers, Frary and Clark (Universal), Okay Industries, and a number of other producers through the 1980s.

The first use of plastics was the lunch box handle, but later spread to the entire box, with the first molded plastic boxes produced during the 1960s. Vinyl lunch boxes debuted in 1959.

During the 1960s, the lunch box had few changes. The vacuum bottle included in them, however, steadily evolved during the course of the decade and into the 1970s. What was originally a steel vacuum bottle with glass liner, cork or rubber stopper, and bakelite cup became an all-plastic bottle, with insulated foam rather than vacuum. Aladdin produced glass liners into the 1970s, but they were soon replaced with plastic.

=== School safety ===
Beginning in Florida during the 1970s, with the lobbying of parents who claimed the metal boxes were being used as weapons in fights, many schools in the United States banned metal lunch boxes. One of the last metal lunchboxes to be widely produced was one with a design promoting Rambo: First Blood Part II.

=== Health issues ===
Health concerns came to light in August 2002, when the Center for Environmental Health discovered that many popular vinyl lunch boxes contained dangerous levels of lead. Although not all were removed, many were pulled from the shelves.

In 2001, most major manufacturers began testing their lunch boxes for lead levels, remedying the issue, and labeling their boxes as lead-free.

=== Modern lunch boxes ===
Today, lunch boxes are generally made of plastic with foam insulation and an aluminium/vinyl interior. As a result, they usually retain temperature better but are less rigid and protective. However, metal lunch boxes are still produced, though they are not as popular as they were in the 1960s through 1980s.

=== Collecting ===
Some lunch boxes, including those from the 1950s and 1960s, sometimes sell into the thousands of dollars. In 1999, a "1954 Superman lunch box, made by Adco Liberty" was "gaveled down for $11,500" ("the highest auction price ever paid for a lunch box").

=== Political symbolism ===
In the United States, the lunch box or lunch pail has been used as a symbol of the working class. The phrase "lunch pail Democrat" is used to classify populist politicians who attempt to gain the votes of the working class. The New York Times printed in 2008 that Joe Biden is a lunch-bucket Democrat. While his father had been wealthy early in life, by the time Biden was born, the family was broke.

== Outside the United States ==
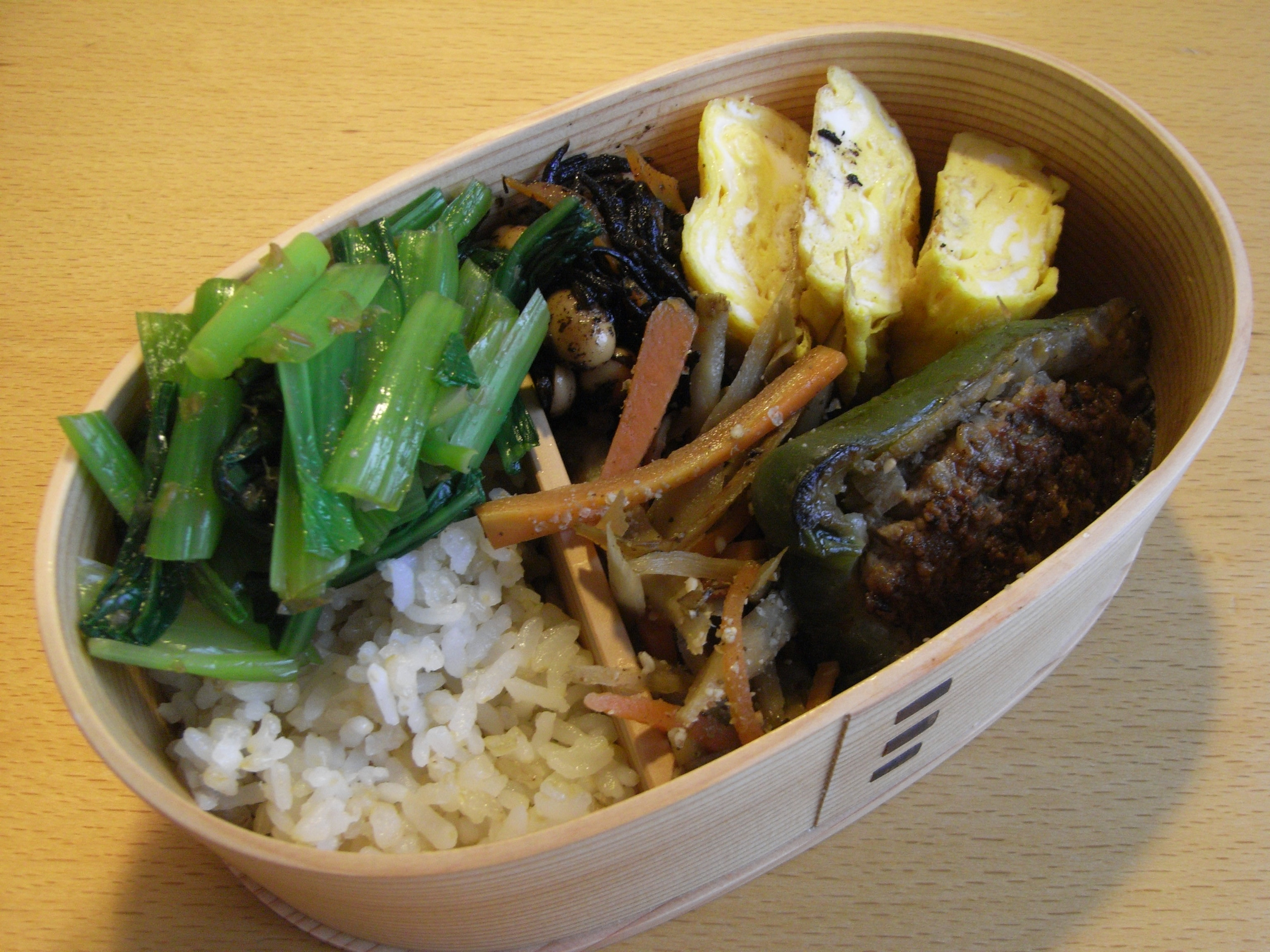
Japanese magewappa

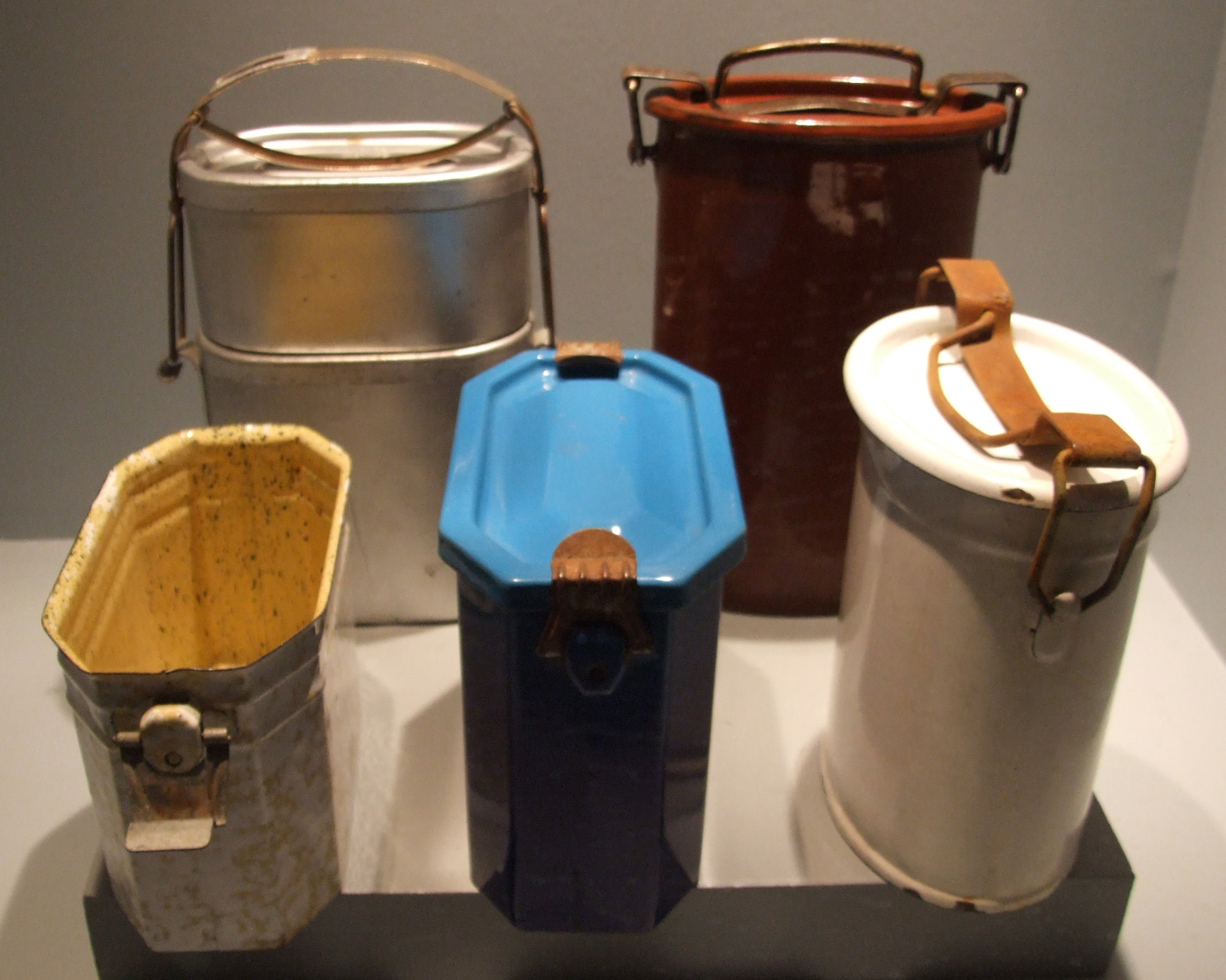
Metal lunchbox tubs with latches for big meals

Japan has a tradition of bento, individual portable meals, that dates back several centuries and influenced other countries in South East Asia. Bento generally consists of rice and a number of other food items, transported within a lunchbox that has compartments to keep each item separate from each other.

In Mumbai, India and Karachi, Pakistan, there are extensive lunchbox delivery services, continuing a business model that originated in 1890, where delivery staff called dabawallas pick up metal tiffin carrier lunchboxes containing freshly cooked food, usually from the recipient's home, deliver them to people at their place of work and return empty lunchboxes.

In Korea, the similar concept is known as dosirak.

In some South American countries, a lunch box is called "lonchera", especially among school children, in assimilation of the English word "lunch".

== See also ==
- Bento – Japan
- Brown bag
- Dosirak – Korea
- Tiffin carrier – India and Pakistan
