= Wappameshi =

Japanese dish cooked in wooden round containers

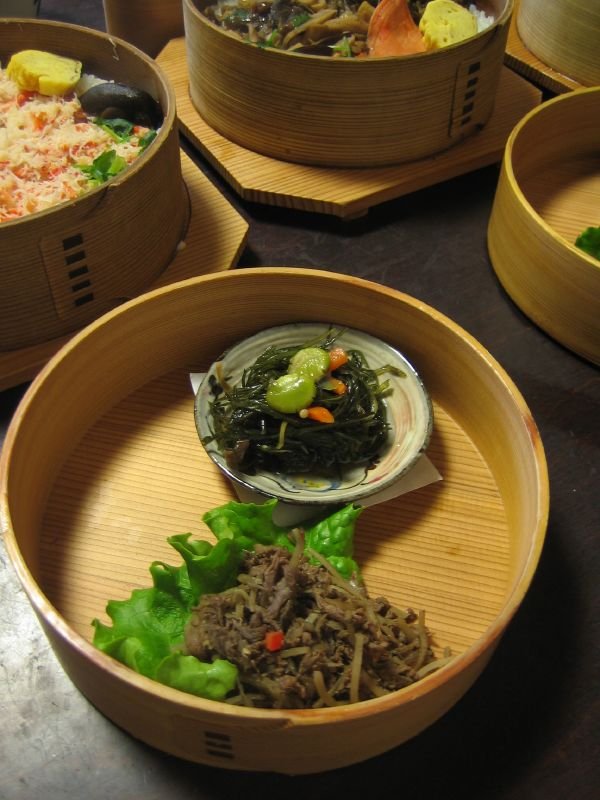
Wappameshi

Wappa meshi (わっぱ飯) is a Japanese dish cooked in special round containers (called wappa, which can be used as Bento boxes) made of thin wooden sheets. It is rice topped with other ingredients and is a specialty of the Niigata or Fukushima Prefecture.
