= Packed lunch =

Lunch carried to a destination

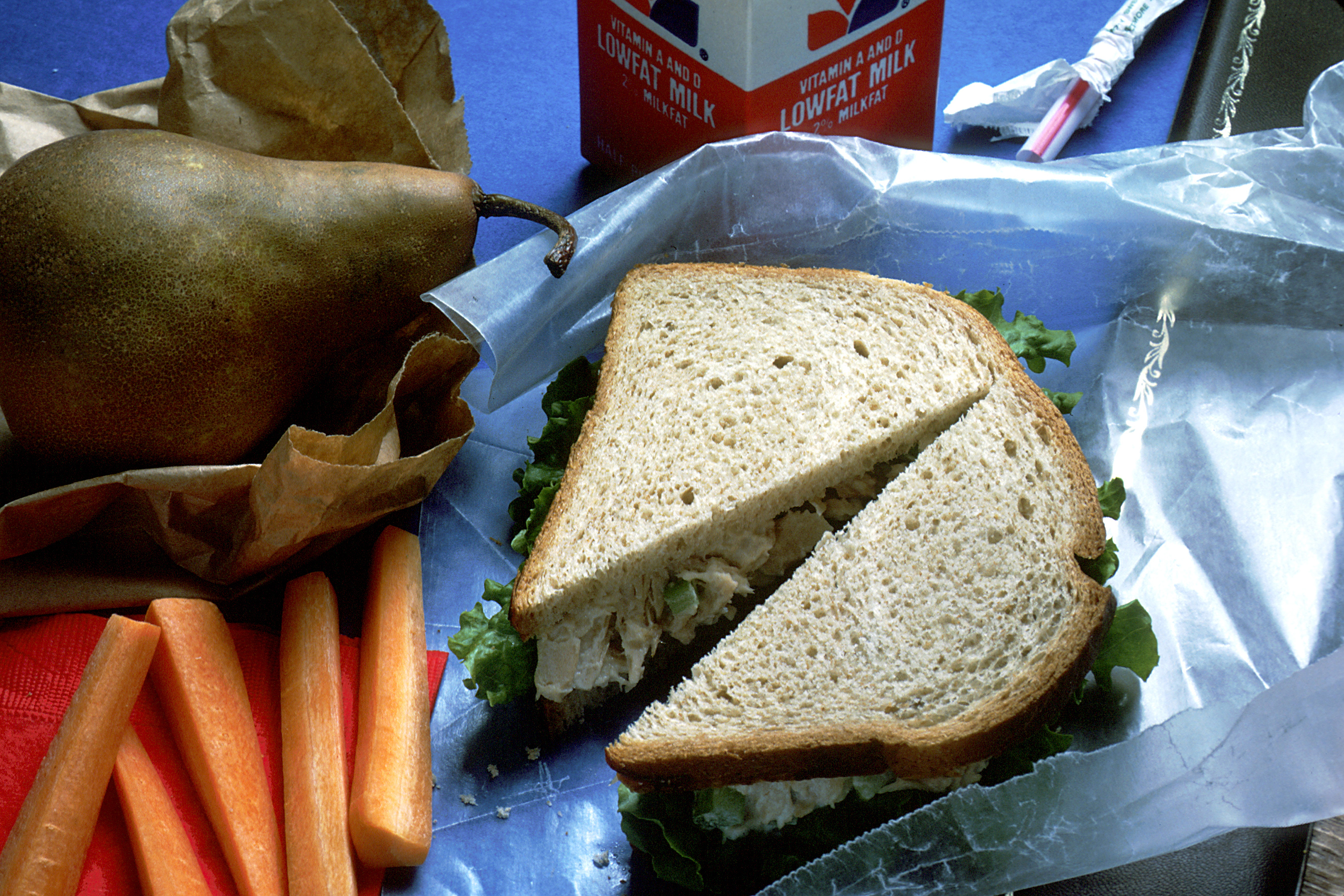
American bagged lunch

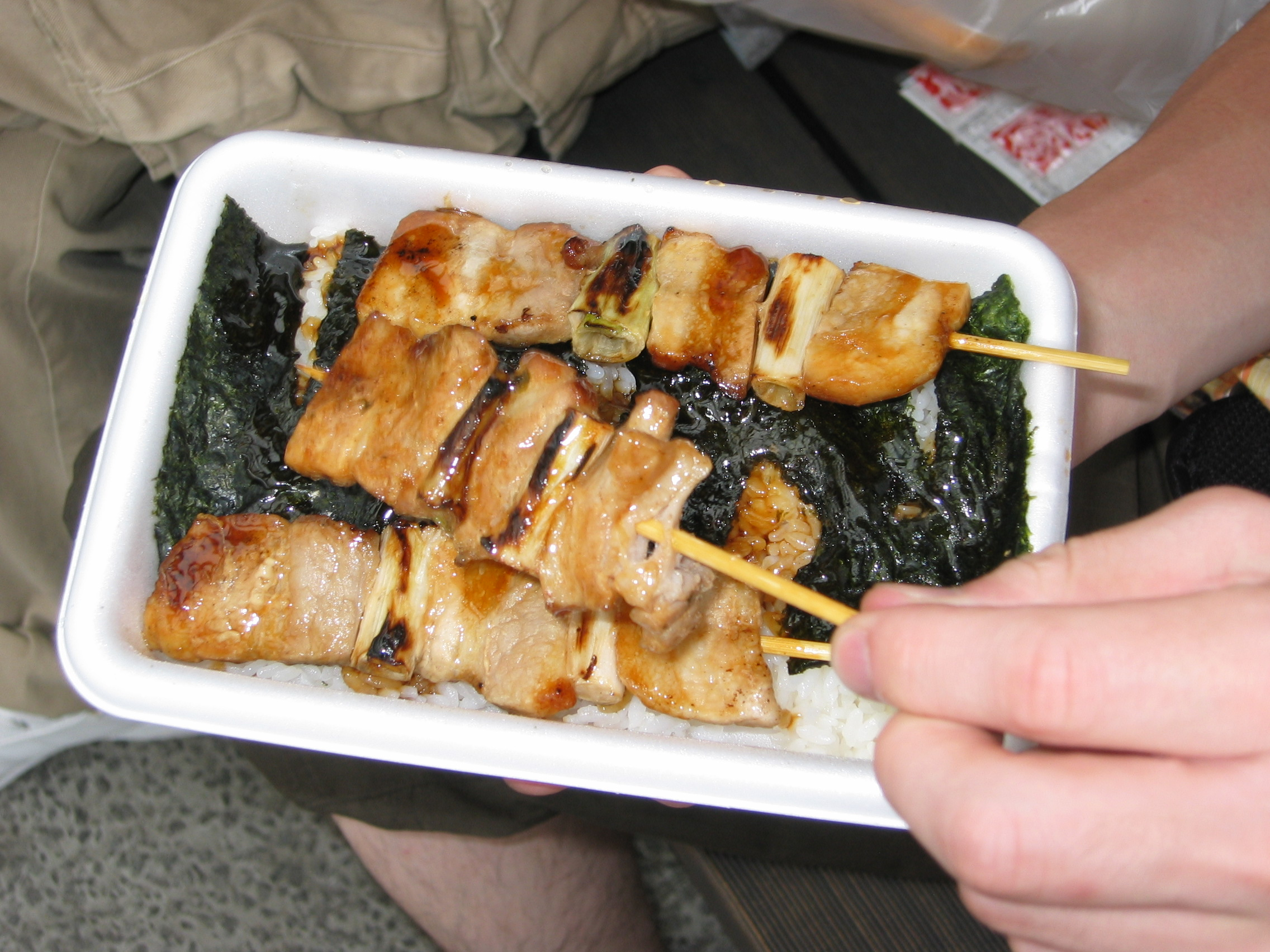
Japanese bento packed lunch

A packed lunch (also called pack lunch, sack lunch or brown-bag lunch in North America) is a lunch which is prepared before arriving at the place where it is to be eaten. Typically, it is prepared at home or at a hotel, or produced commercially for sale in vending machines or at convenience stores. They are often eaten in a school or workplace, or on an outing.

== Technique ==
The food is usually wrapped in plastic, aluminum foil, or paper and can be carried ("packed") in a paper bag ("sack"), plastic bag or lunchbox. Lunchboxes made out of metal, plastic or vinyl are popular. They provide a way to take heavier lunches in a sturdier box or bag, and are also considered more environmentally friendly than disposable packaging. While packed lunches are usually taken from home by the people who are going to eat them, in Mumbai, India, tiffin boxes are most often picked up from the home and brought to workplaces later in the day by so-called dabbawallas.

In many countries it is also possible to buy packed lunches from places such as convenience stores, supermarkets, bakeries and coffee shops, often in the form of a sandwich or other main item, a drink, and a smaller item such as a packet of potato chips or pre-prepared fruit, all offered together for a fixed price. This is commonly known as a meal deal, especially in the United Kingdom.

In Norway, a very widespread tradition of packing a lunch, called a matpakke ('food packet'), developed out of a free meal programme for schoolchildren instituted in the 1930s, called the Oslo breakfast. Norwegians have only half an hour for lunch and the matpakke is characteristically simple, open-faced sandwiches of wholewheat bread packaged in wax paper and separated with smaller sheets of wax paper called mellomleggspapir ('interlayer paper'). Matpakke can be eaten quickly, allowing the lunch period to be used to relax.

In the United States, an informal meeting at work, over lunch, where everyone brings a packed lunch, is a brown-bag lunch or colloquially a "brown bag".

One of the earliest references to this type of meal is found in the Bible, where it is said that the prophet Habakkuk, then in Judea, prepared oatmeal and pieces of bread in a basket to take as a meal to the harvesters.

== In politics ==
The American brown-bag lunch was used as a deliberate rebuff of the Chinese hosts, by the United States delegation, at peace negotiations in Kaesong during the Korean War. The Chinese hosts offered lunch and watermelon to the U.S. guests, which the U.S. delegates, who considered lunching with one's opposition to be fraternizing with the enemy, rejected in favor of their own packed lunches.

== See also ==
- Airline meal, often a pre-packaged meal
- Bento
- Dosirak
- Lunchbox
- Ploughman's lunch
- Tiffin
- TV dinner
