= Sulhee Jessica Woo =

American content creator and author

- Born: October 21, 1986 (age 39); Las Vegas, Nevada, U.S.
- Occupations: Content creator; entrepreneur; author
- Years active: 2020–present
- Known for: Bento box lunch videos on TikTok

Sulhee Jessica Woo (born October 21, 1986), also known as the Bento Box Queen, is an American content creator, entrepreneur, and author known for her bento box lunch videos on TikTok, where she has amassed more than seven million followers. A single mother of three daughters based in Las Vegas, she is recognized for creating elaborately themed lunch boxes that blend global cuisines with pop-culture references, each accompanied by a handwritten note. She also maintains a YouTube channel with more than 680,000 subscribers. In 2024, she published her debut cookbook, Let's Make Some Lunch, through DK, an imprint of Penguin Random House.

== Early life ==
Woo is of Korean, Chinese, and Hawaiian descent. She grew up in Las Vegas and earned a bachelor's degree in journalism and media studies with a concentration in public relations and advertising. Before turning to content creation, she worked as a makeup artist and in the advertising industry, eventually rising to become a marketing director.

== Career ==
=== TikTok and social media ===
Woo joined TikTok in January 2020 and began posting short videos of the bento box lunches she prepared for her three daughters before school. Her videos, which typically open with the catchphrase "Let's make some lunch for my kids!," feature culturally themed meals incorporating elements from Korean, Japanese, Mexican, Filipino, and other global cuisines, often styled after pop-culture characters and events. Each lunch includes a handwritten note of encouragement for her daughters.

Her account grew rapidly; by August 2020, she was featured on Good Morning America's "Taste of TikTok" series, where she demonstrated her omurice recipe. An "Among Us"-themed pancake video became one of her most-viewed posts, garnering approximately 30 million views. By 2021, Las Vegas Weekly profiled her as a leading TikTok food creator, noting her partnerships with brands including Disney and Zulily. As of 2026, her TikTok account has more than seven million followers and over 200 million cumulative likes.

In April 2021, TikTok named Woo to its inaugural Asian and Pacific Islander Trailblazers list, recognizing 15 creators for "educating, entertaining, and advocating for the API community." She was also selected for TikTok's Discover List, a curated selection of notable creators on the platform.

=== Television appearances ===
In 2021, Woo appeared as a guest judge on Top Chef Family Style, a Peacock cooking competition series hosted by Meghan Trainor. In 2024, she was featured on Gordon Ramsay's YouTube series Idiot Sandwich. She has also appeared on the 8 News Now program Las Vegas Now in multiple segments demonstrating lunch-preparation techniques.

=== Cookbook ===
Woo's debut cookbook, Let's Make Some Lunch: Recipes Made with Love for Everyone, was published by DK (Penguin Random House) on July 30, 2024. The 272-page book contains more than 150 globally inspired recipes—drawing from Indian, Italian, Japanese, Filipino, Thai, and Mexican cuisines—organized into 60 mix-and-match lunch box combinations, each paired with a musical recommendation. She promoted the book through a national signing tour at Williams Sonoma stores in Houston, Dallas, Chicago, and Costa Mesa. Recipes from the book were featured on NPR's Life Kit and The Splendid Table. ParentsCanada praised the book as "ridiculously fun" and highlighted its creative recipes.

=== Brand partnerships ===
Woo operates her content creation business under the name Bento Box Society LLC. She has partnered with brands across the food, technology, entertainment, and retail sectors, including McDonald's, Google, LG, Instacart, Royal Caribbean, Kroger, Target, NFL, Whole Foods, Netflix, and Walmart. In 2024, she collaborated with Little Spoon, a children's food company, on a line of bento box products. In 2025, she released The Woo Blend, a signature seasoning salt created in collaboration with Josu Salt that features gochugaru, Chinese five spice, pineapple, and ginger.

=== Political involvement ===
During the 2024 presidential election, Woo participated in the Democratic National Convention's creator program, producing content for the Harris campaign's social media outreach. The Harris–Walz campaign connected with 106 influencers in Nevada with a combined 12.5 million followers as part of its digital outreach strategy.

In March 2025, Woo created a viral TikTok video for Women's History Month featuring six Democratic congresswomen—Alexandria Ocasio-Cortez, Jasmine Crockett, Lauren Underwood, Katherine Clark, Judy Chu, and Susie Lee—posing in combat stances to the character-selection music from Super Smash Bros. in a "Choose Your Fighter" format. Each congresswoman's video segment listed personal attributes and political accomplishments. The video went viral and drew widespread attention; the White House responded on X with a post captioned "Democrats Not Be Cringe Challenge" with the subtext "Level: Impossible," and released a counter-montage captioned "America Chose Its Fighters Last November." Woo appeared on NewsNation's On Balance with Leland Vittert to discuss the video, stating: "At the end of the day, it is a silly TikTok video, but who's talking about it? Everyone."

== Cultural impact ==
Woo's content has been noted for shifting cultural attitudes toward ethnic foods in school lunchboxes. In interviews, she has discussed how her elaborately styled bento boxes help "reclaim the lunchbox moment"—a reference to the common experience among Asian American children of feeling self-conscious about bringing ethnic food to school—by making culturally diverse lunches aspirational and widely admired.

== Recognition ==
- TikTok inaugural Asian and Pacific Islander Trailblazers list (2021)
- TikTok Discover List
- Las Vegas Weekly featured food creator (2021)
- VEGAS INC "40 Under 40" (2024)
