= Bento =

Japanese-style single-portion meal

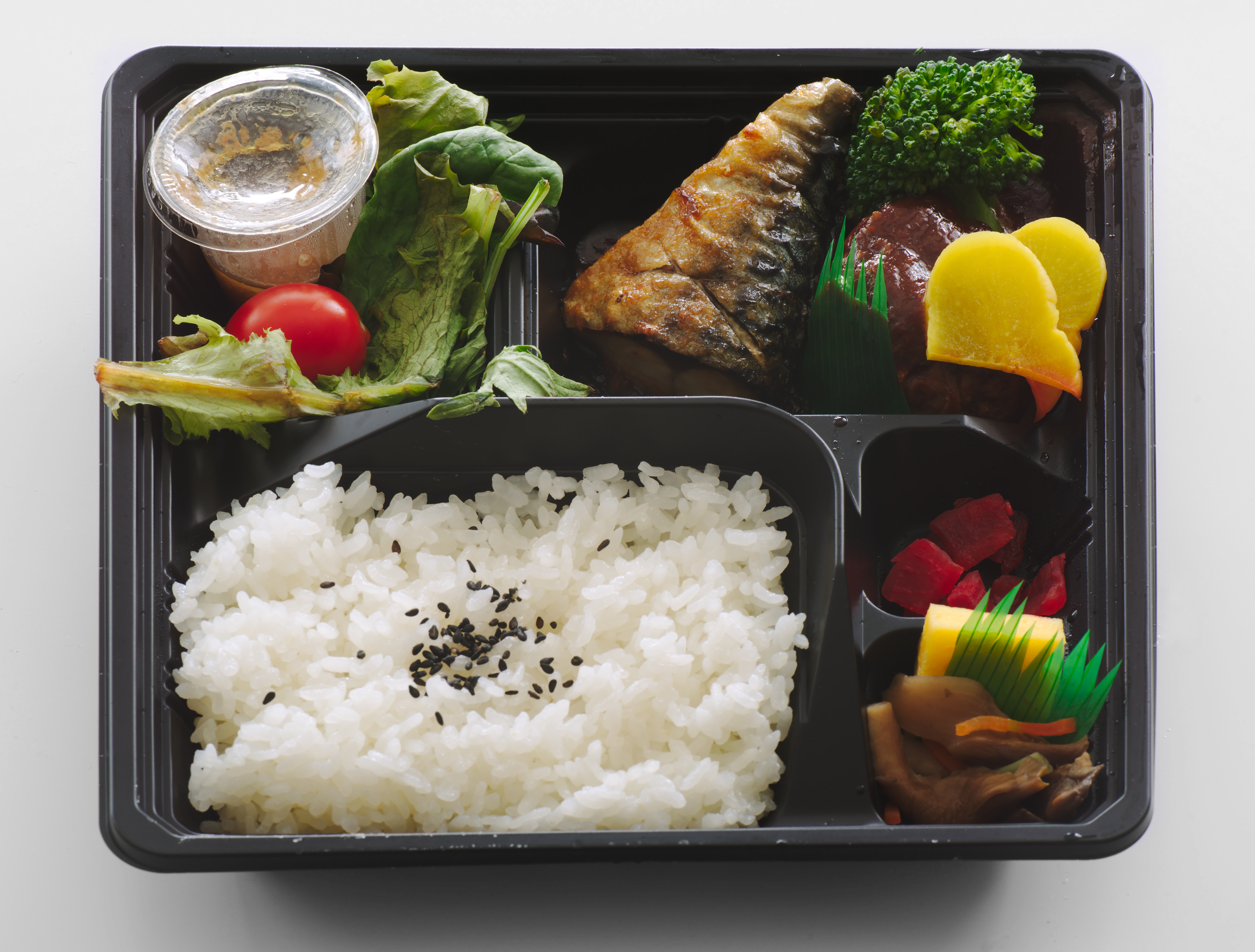
A typical bento from a grocery store

A bento (弁当, bentō) is a single-portion take-out or home-packed meal of Japanese origin, often for lunch, typically including rice and packaged in a box with a lid (often a segmented box with different parts of the meal placed in different sections).

A traditional bento typically includes rice or noodles with fish or some other meat, often with pickled and cooked vegetables in a box. Containers range from mass-produced disposable containers to hand-crafted lacquerware. Dividers are often used to separate ingredients or dishes, especially those with strong flavors, to avoid them affecting the taste of the rest of the meal. A typical divider is green plastic "sushi grass", known as baran in Japan, which also works to slow the growth of bacteria.

Bento are readily available in many places throughout Japan, including convenience stores, bento shops (弁当屋, bentō-ya), railway stations, and department stores. However, Japanese homemakers often spend time and energy on carefully prepared bento for their spouses, children, or themselves. Outside Japan, the term bento box may be used (e.g., on English menus for Japanese restaurants). Bento can be elaborately arranged in styles called kyaraben ("character bento", typically decorated to look like popular characters from anime, manga, or video games) or oekakiben ("picture bento", decorated to look like people, animals, buildings and monuments, or items such as flowers and plants). Contests are often held where bento arrangers compete for the most aesthetically attractive arrangements.

There are comparable forms of boxed lunches in other Asian countries such as in Taiwan, Korea, and other Sinophone communities, known as piān-tong in Taiwanese Hokkien, in Korea as dosirak and héfàn (盒饭) or biàndāng in Mandarin. Other Asian countries either use bento as a loanword or hokben, which means "steaming bento".

== Terminology, etymology ==
In Japan, it was not originally called “bento”. The practice of carrying food and eating it outside the home can be found in historical texts such as the Kojiki (completed in the 8th century) and the Nihon Shoki (also completed in the 8th century). In the 8th century, this type of portable food was called hoshi-ii (written as 糒 or 乾飯, meaning “dried rice”). Hoshi-ii, or dried rice, was a portable food made by steaming grains and then drying them. In The Tales of Ise, written during the Heian period, there is a poem that says “Thinking of my distant homeland, my tears soaked and softened my hoshi-ii.”

It is said that the practice of carrying food and eating it outside the home began to be called “bento” during the Azuchi–Momoyama period (the era of Oda Nobunaga). During this period, the word “bento” was used with the meaning of “to prepare in advance for later use”, a meaning unique to Japan and quite different from the original meaning of the Chinese characters.

In Japan, "bento" is written in kanji as 弁当 (Kyūjitai: 辨當). The word itself originates from the Chinese Song dynasty slang term 便当 (便當, pinyin: biàndāng), meaning "convenient" or "convenience" (this sense is still used in Wu dialects such as Shanghainese). When the word was imported to Japan, it was written with the ateji 便道 and 弁道. But this word, in Japan, is used in a different meaning from the original Chinese letters.

The word “bento”, which came to mean portable food in Japan, was later exported to other countries in the Chinese-character–using regions of Asia, where it also came to be used with the meaning of portable meals. Taiwan, in particular, was under Japanese rule for about fifty years, which allowed Japanese bento culture to be introduced and take root. In Taiwan, Hong Kong and mainland China, bento is written as 便當 (pinyin: biàndāng). In other Sinophone communities, both biandang and bento are often interchangeably used.

== History ==
The increased popularity of bento can be traced back to the 12th century during the Kamakura period, when meals of cooked and dried rice called hoshi-ii (糒 or 干し飯, literally "dried meal") were developed to be carried to work. A hoshi-ii can be eaten as-is or boiled with water to make cooked rice, and is stored in a small bag. By the 16th century, wooden lacquered boxes were produced, and bento would be eaten during hanami or a tea party.

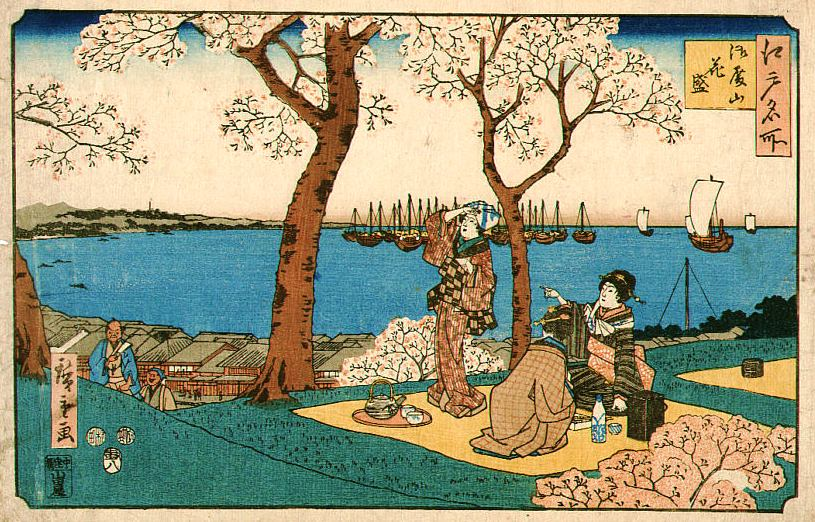
Hanami bento in the Edo period

In the Edo period (1603–1867), bento culture spread and became more refined. Travelers and sightseers would carry a simple koshibentō (腰弁当, "waist bento"), consisting of several onigiri wrapped with bamboo leaves or in a woven bamboo box. One of the most popular styles of bento, called makunouchi bentō ("between-act bento"), was first made during this period. Viewers of Noh and kabuki performances ate specially prepared bento between maku (acts). Numerous cookbooks were published detailing how to cook, how to pack, and what to prepare for occasions like hanami and Hinamatsuri.

In the Meiji era (1868–1912), the first ekibentō or ekiben (駅弁当 or 駅弁, "[train] station bento") was sold. There are several records that claim where ekiben was first sold, but it is believed that it was sold on 16 July 1885 at Utsunomiya Station in the northern Kantō region of Japan, and contained two onigiri and a serving of takuan (pickled radish) wrapped in bamboo leaves. As early schools did not provide lunch, students and teachers carried bento, as did many employees.

In the Taishō era (1912–1926), the aluminium bento box became a luxury item because of its ease of cleaning and its silver-like appearance. Also, a move to abolish the practice of bento in school became a social issue. Disparities in wealth spread during this period after an export boom during World War I and subsequent crop failures in the Tōhoku region. A student's bento too often reflected their wealth, and many wondered if this had an unfavorable influence on children both physically, from lack of adequate diet, and psychologically, from a clumsily made bento or the richness of food. After World War II, the practice of bringing bento to school gradually declined and was replaced by uniform meals provided for all students and teachers.

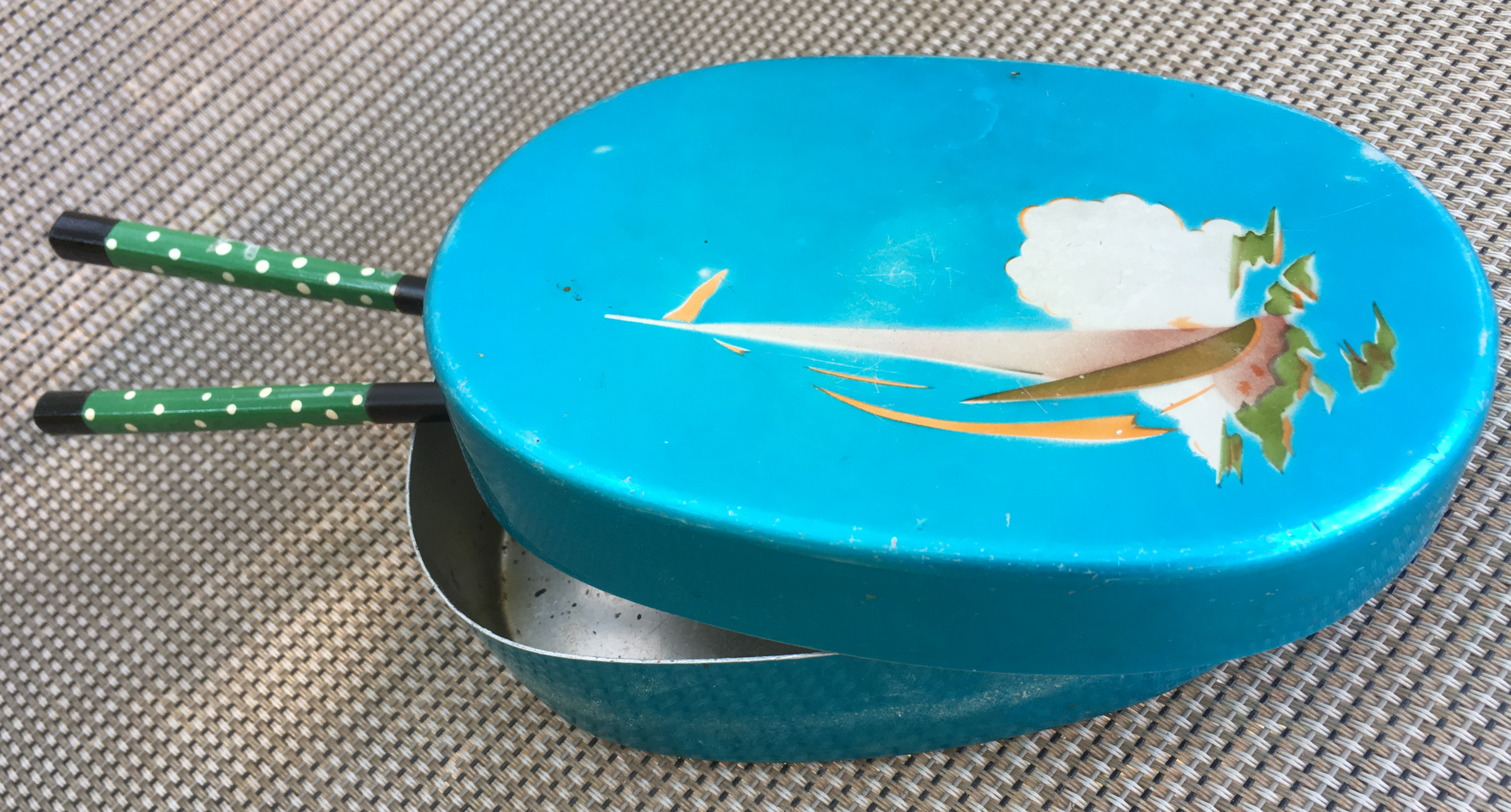
Aluminum bento box, 1961. Lid fits closely. Small compartment for condiments.

Bento regained popularity in the 1980s with the help of the microwave oven and the proliferation of convenience stores. In addition, the expensive wood and metal boxes have been replaced at most bento shops with inexpensive, disposable polystyrene boxes. However, even handmade bento has made a comeback, and they are once again a common, although not universal, sight at Japanese schools. Bento are still used by workers as a packed lunch, and by families on day trips, school picnics, and sports days. Homemade bento are wrapped in a furoshiki cloth, which acts as both a carrying bag and a table mat.

== Culture ==
In Japan, it is common for mothers to make bento for their children to take to school. Because making bento can take a while, some mothers will prepare the ingredients the night before, and then assemble and pack everything the following morning before their children go to school. It is often a social expectation of mothers to provide bento for their children, to create both a nutritionally balanced and aesthetically pleasing meal. This activity is expected of the mother and emphasized by society at large, and is common in nursery school institutions.

The traditional bento that is eaten at school or at work is most often prepared by the mother or the wife. However, bento can also be bought at konbini (convenience stores) or from street vendors who appear on street corners at lunchtime. For those in a hurry who spend their lunch time aboard Shinkansen bullet trains, ekiben are available in train stations.

Osechi, an assortment of foods eaten around the Japanese New Year, is typically arranged in a multi-tiered jūbako box, similarly to bento.

The slang term hayaben (早弁), literally "early bento", refers to eating a bento before lunch and having another lunch afterward. Additionally, Noriben (のり弁) is used metaphorically to refer to government documents that have been blacked out and censored.

In the United States, bento box preparation has gained widespread popularity on social media, particularly TikTok, where creators such as Sulhee Jessica Woo have attracted millions of followers by sharing elaborately themed bento box lunches.

== Types ==
=== By ingredients ===
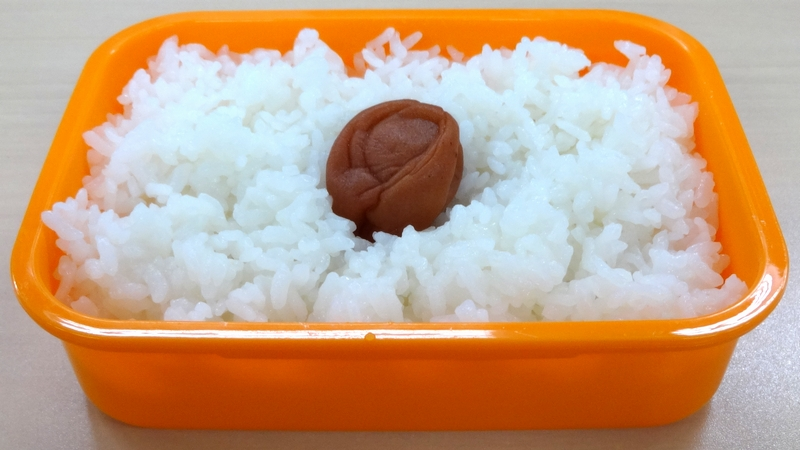
Hinomaru bentō

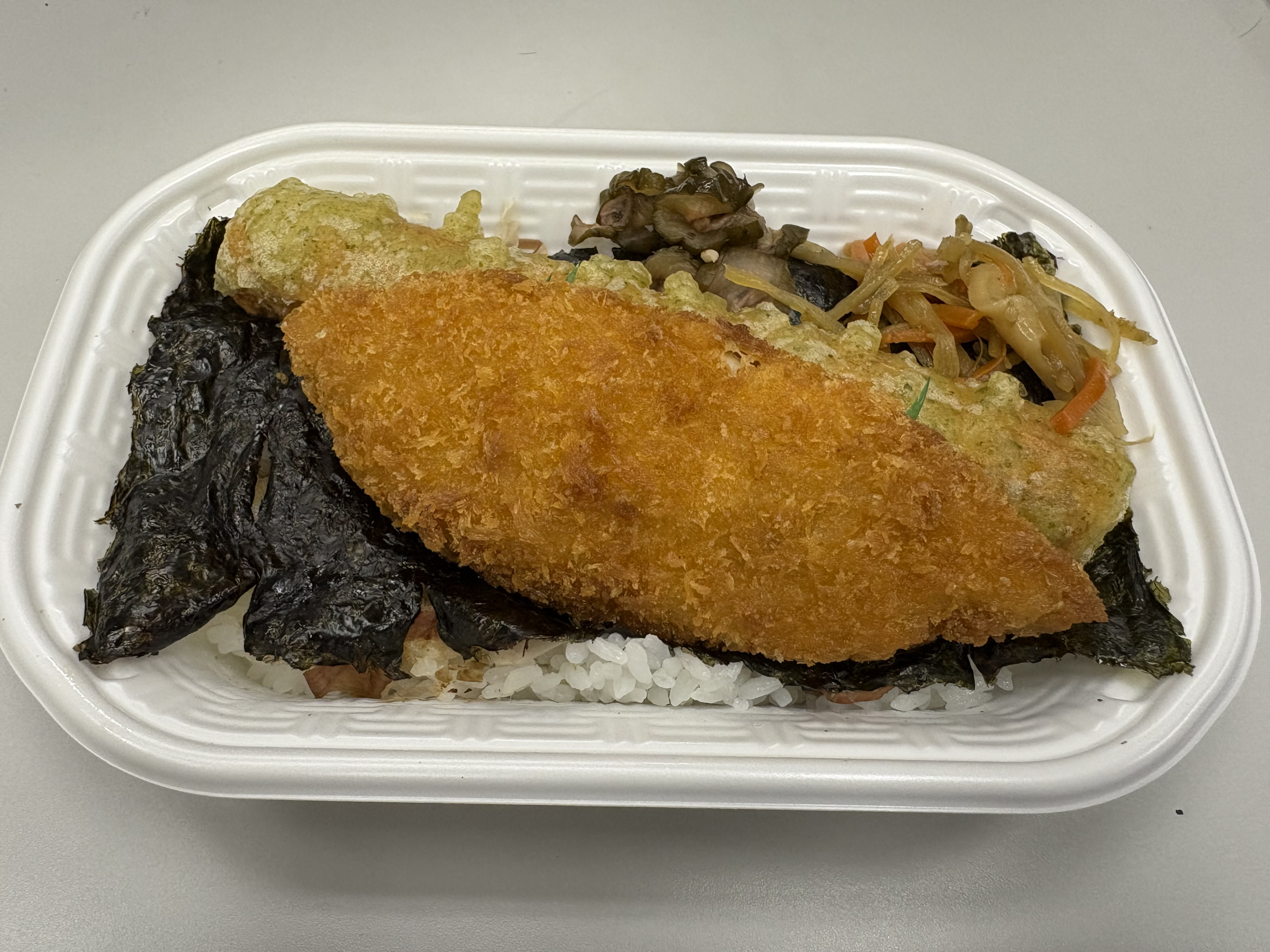
Noriben

- Hinomaru bentō (日の丸弁当), named and patterned after the flag of Japan (Hinomaru), is the name for a bento consisting of plain white rice with an umeboshi in the centre. Pure Hinomaru bento only consists of rice and an umeboshi to flavor the rice, without any other side dishes. The metal bento boxes once popular in Japan were often corroded by the acid from the umeboshi, eventually making a hole in the middle of the lid.
- Formally known as nori bentō(海苔弁当) and often abbreviated as noriben (海苔弁), is a bento with nori dipped in soy sauce covering cooked rice and usually with fried fish, chikuwa and so on. The nori bento ranks first in the annual sales ranking by bento category at Hotto Motto, one of Japan’s top bento chains.
- Karaage bentō is a bento mostly with chicken karaage as the main dish. The karaage bento ranks second in the annual sales ranking by bento category at Hotto Motto.
- Sake bentō (鮭弁当) is a simple bento with a slice of broiled salmon as the main dish.
- Tori bento (鳥弁当) consists of pieces of chicken cooked in sauce served over rice. It is a popular bento in Gunma Prefecture.

=== By style or container ===
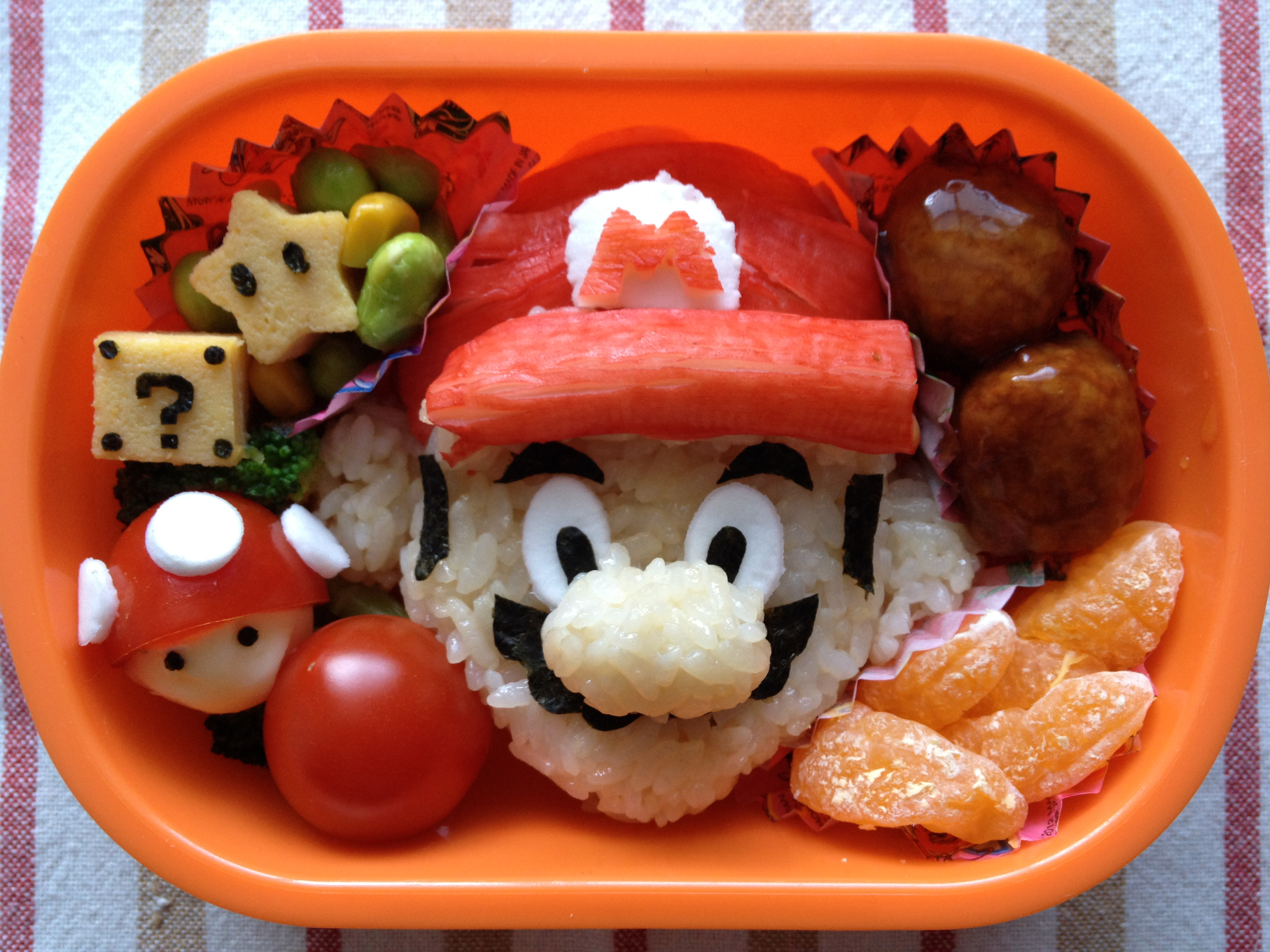
Kyaraben with Mario

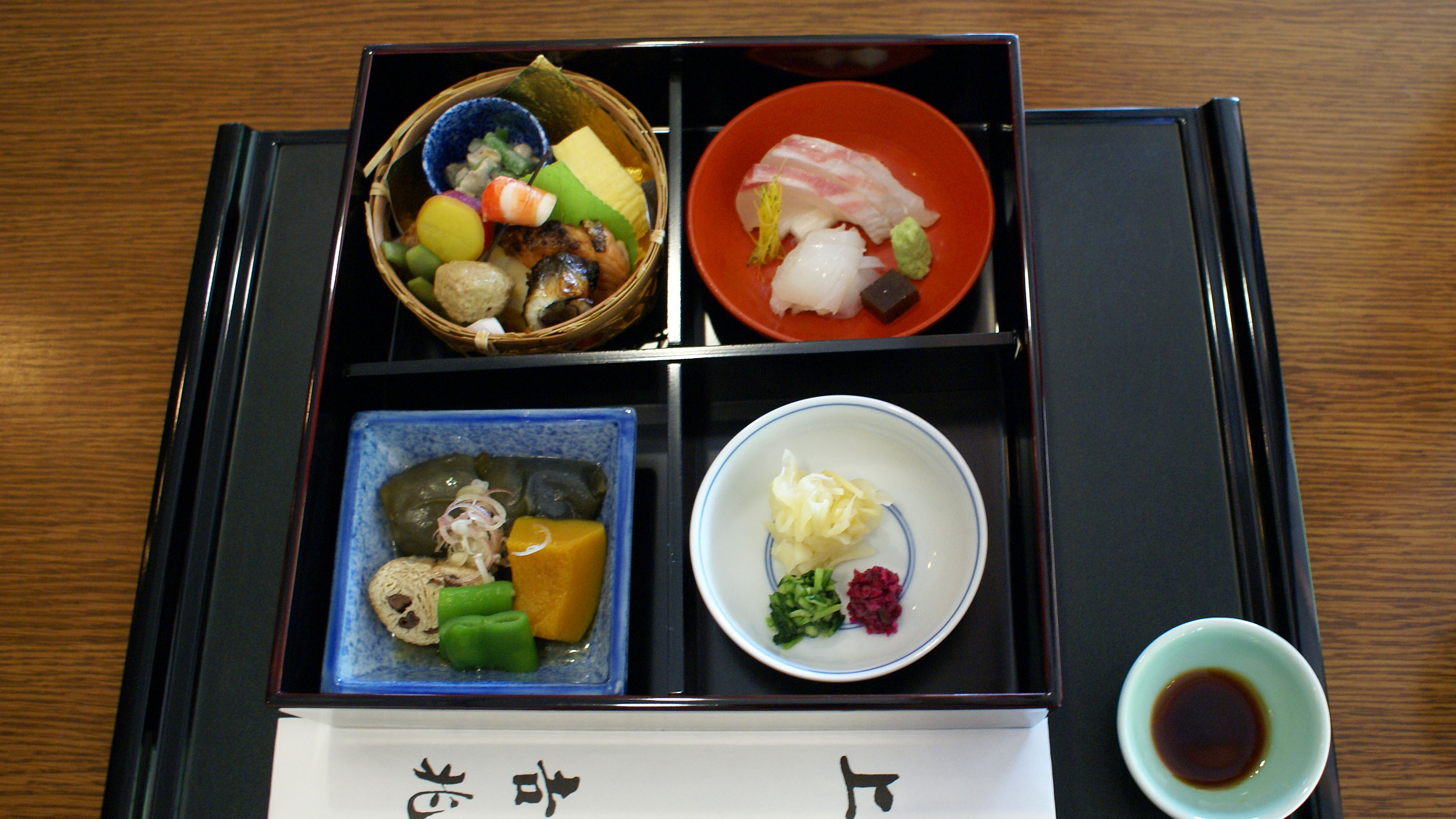
Shōkadō bentō

- Kamameshi bentō (釜飯弁当) are cooked and served in clay pots and sold at train stations in Nagano Prefecture. After eating, the pot becomes a souvenir item.
- Kyaraben (キャラ弁) are bento with the contents arranged to look like popular characters from anime, manga, or video games.
- Makunouchi bentō (幕の内弁当) is a classic style of bento with rice, umeboshi, a slice of broiled salmon, and a rolled egg.
- Shōkadō bentō (松花堂弁当) is a traditional black-lacquered bento box. It inspired IBM's ThinkPad design.
- Wappameshi (わっぱめし) is a meal served in a special round wooden bento-styled container.
- Shikaeshiben (仕返し弁) is "revenge" bento made by wives to get back at their husbands. Insults are written in the food, or it is made inedible.

=== By origin ===
- Ekiben (駅弁) is bento sold at railway stations or onboard trains. There are many kinds of ekiben; most are inexpensive and filling.
- Hokaben (ホカ弁) is any kind of bento bought at take-out bento shops. Freshly cooked hot (hokahoka) rice is usually served with freshly prepared side dishes. The name was popularized after a pioneering take-out bento franchise in the field, Hokka Hokka Tei.
- Shidashi bentō (仕出し弁当) is made in a restaurant and delivered during lunch. This bento is often eaten at a gathering, such as a funeral or a party. It is usually packed with traditional Japanese foods like tempura, rice and pickled vegetables. A shidashi bento packed with European-style food is also available.
- Soraben (空弁) is bento sold at airports.
Japanese bento types

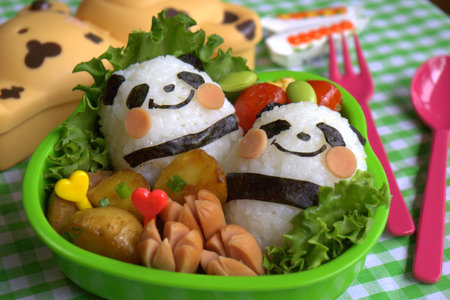
Oekakiben containing rice balls decorated with nori to resemble pandas

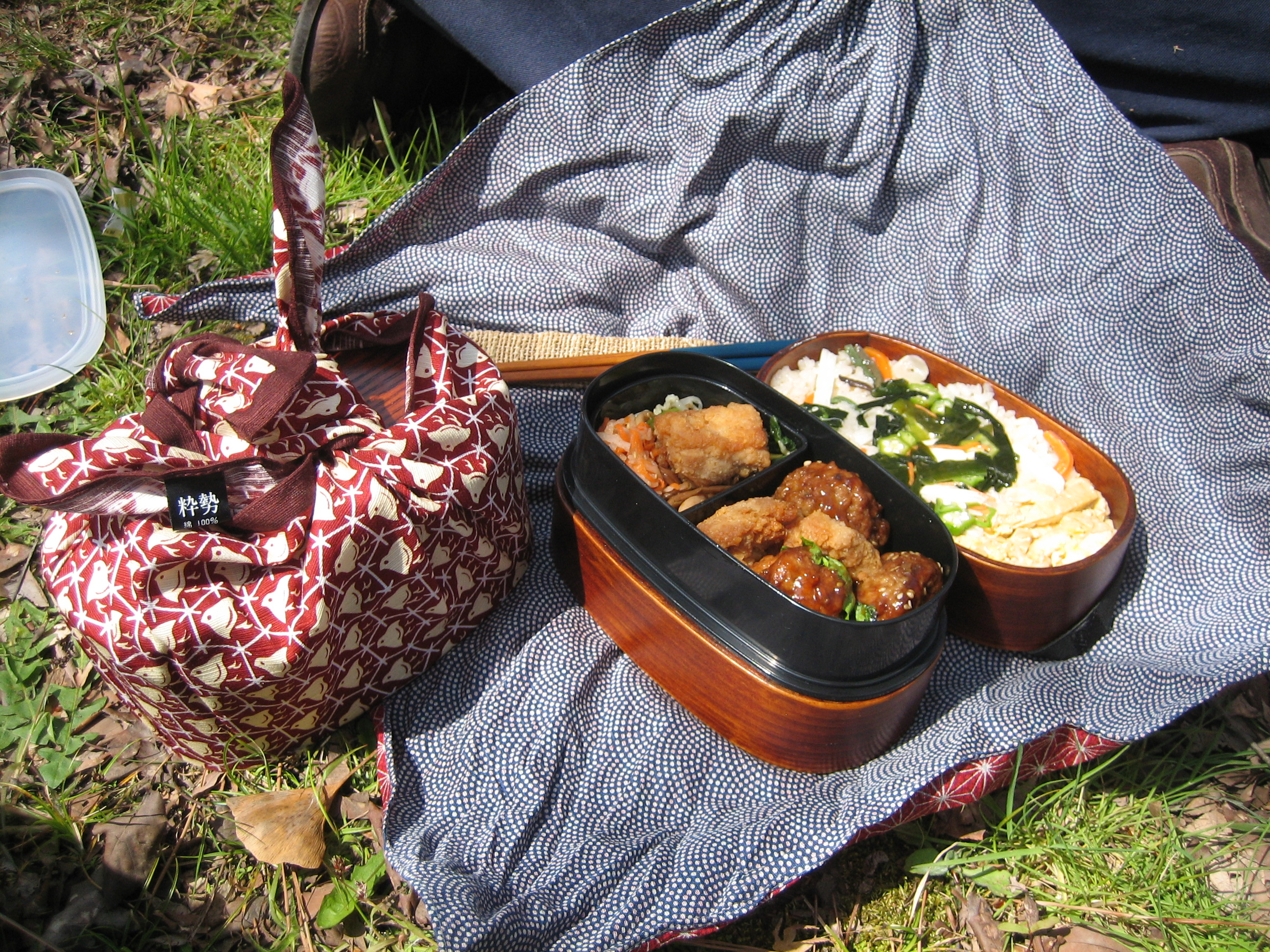
Two typical homemade bento (one open, one wrapped) with furoshiki cloths

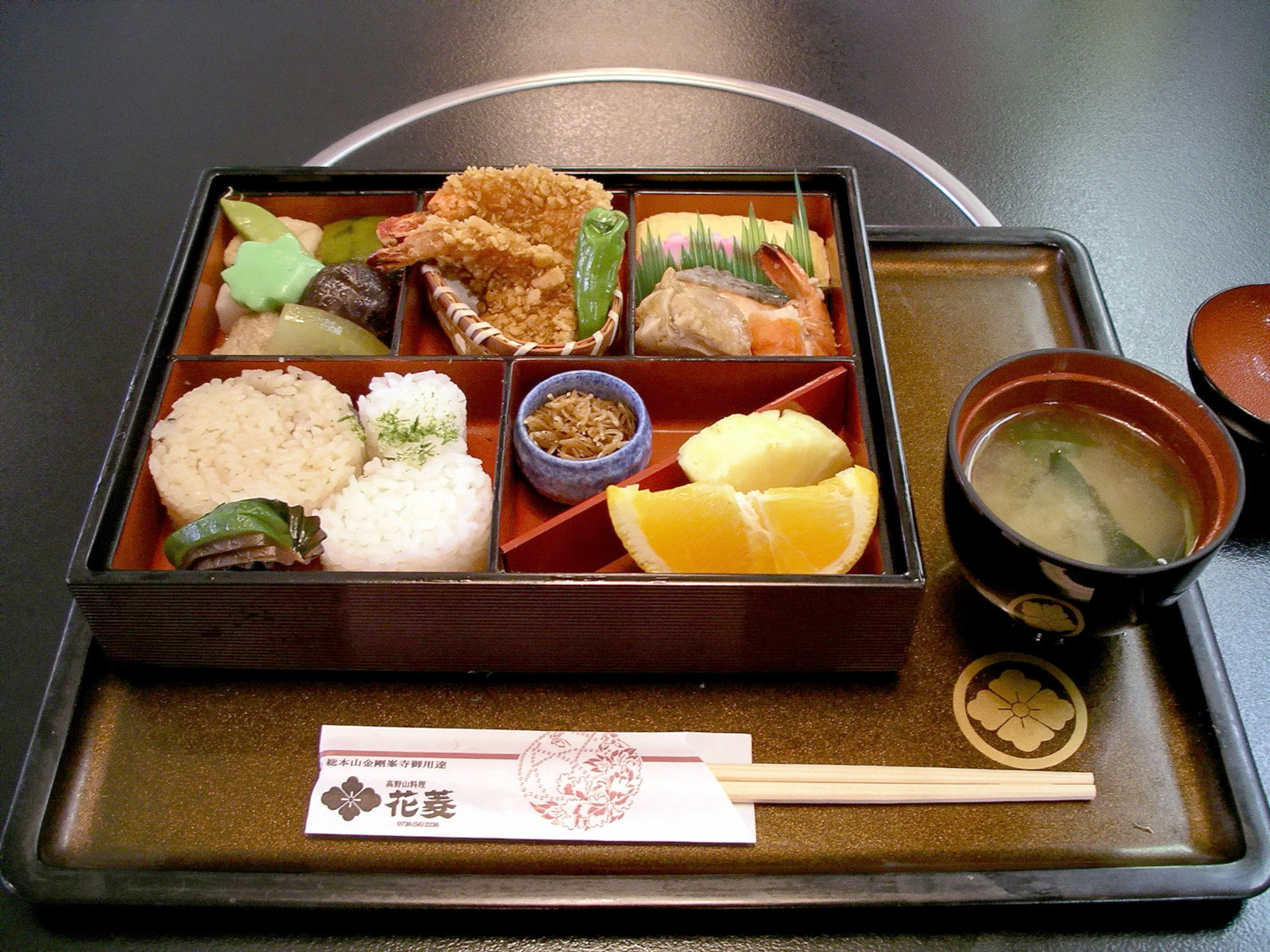
Bento served at a restaurant in Japan

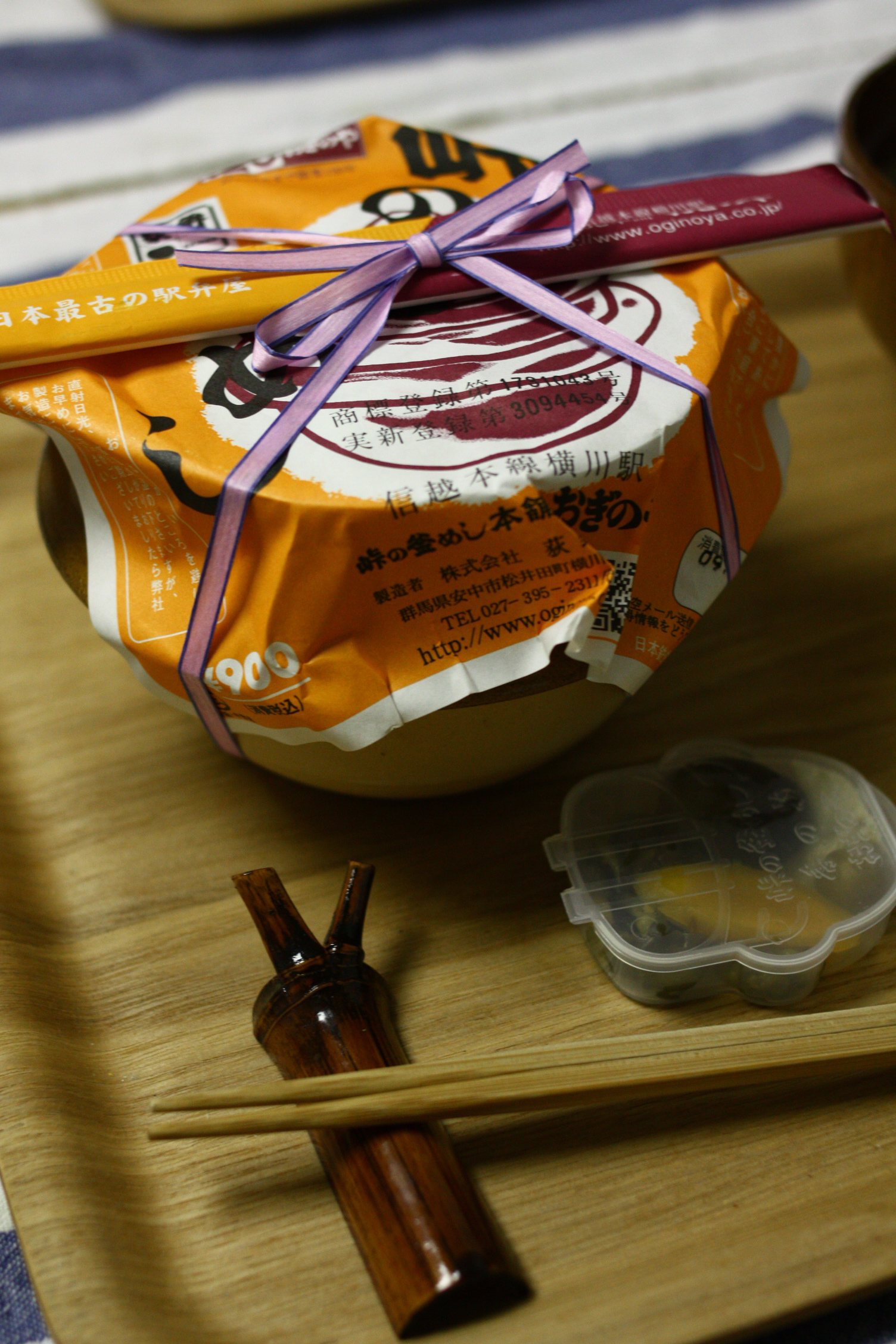
Tōge no kamameshi bento

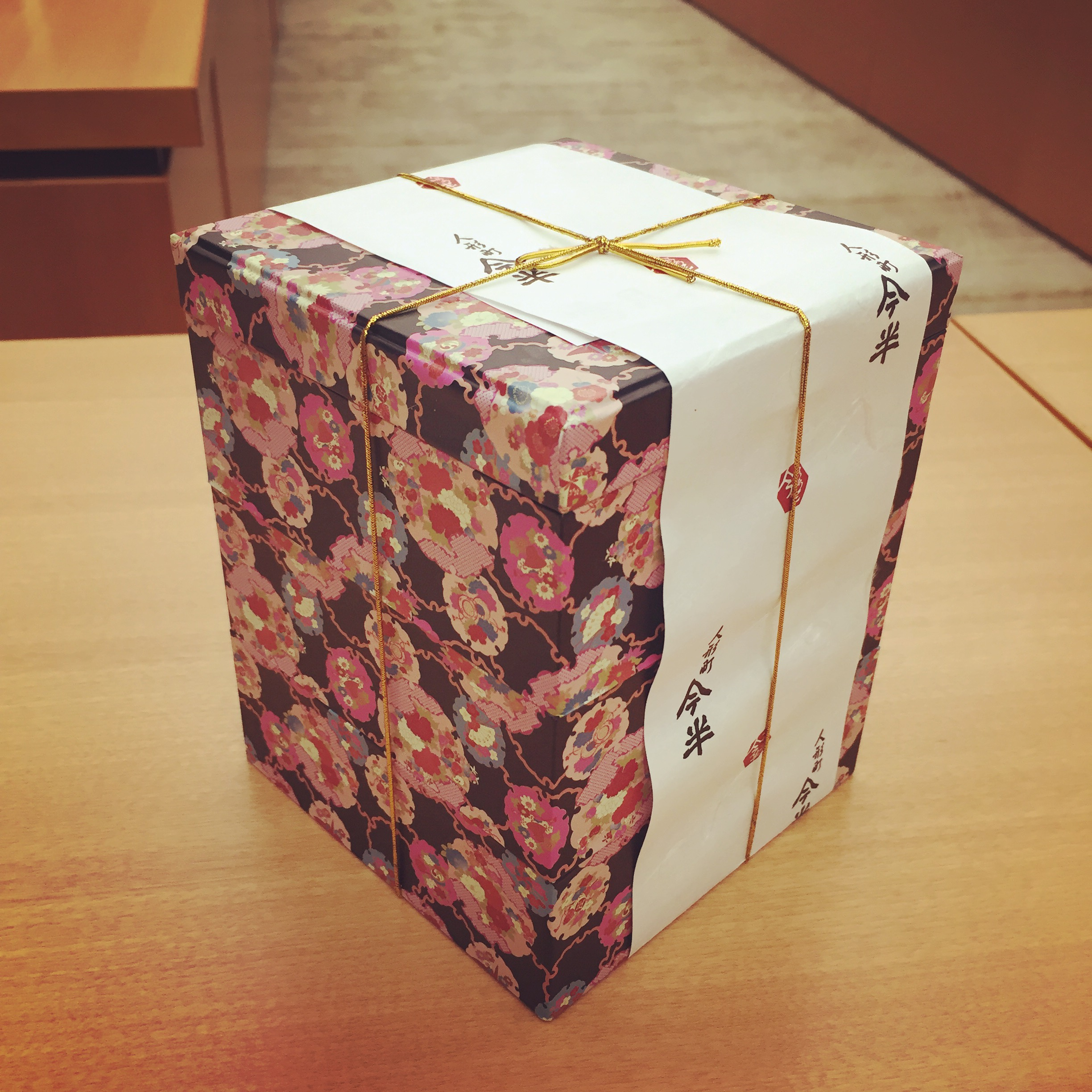
Orizume bentō, closed

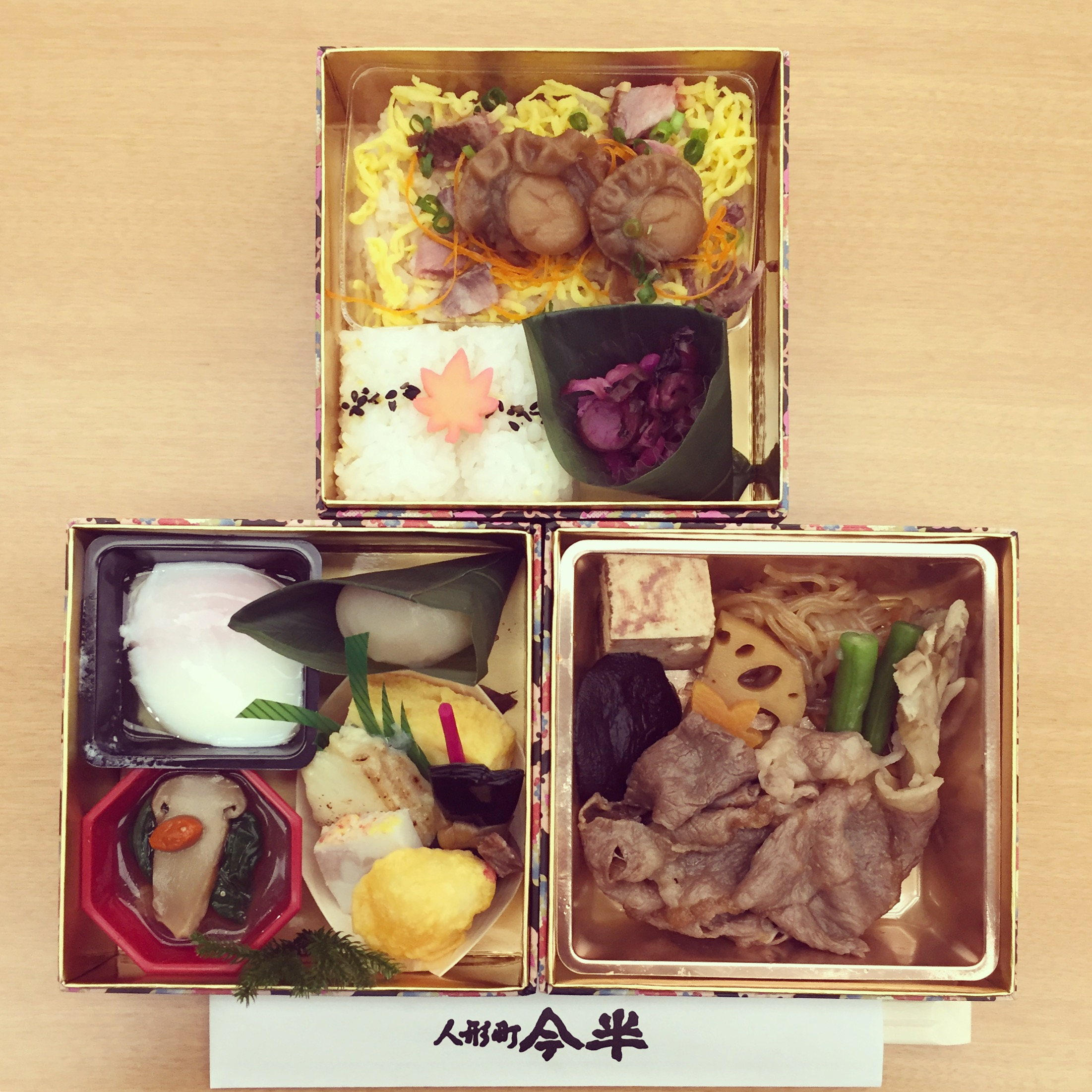
Orizume bentō, open

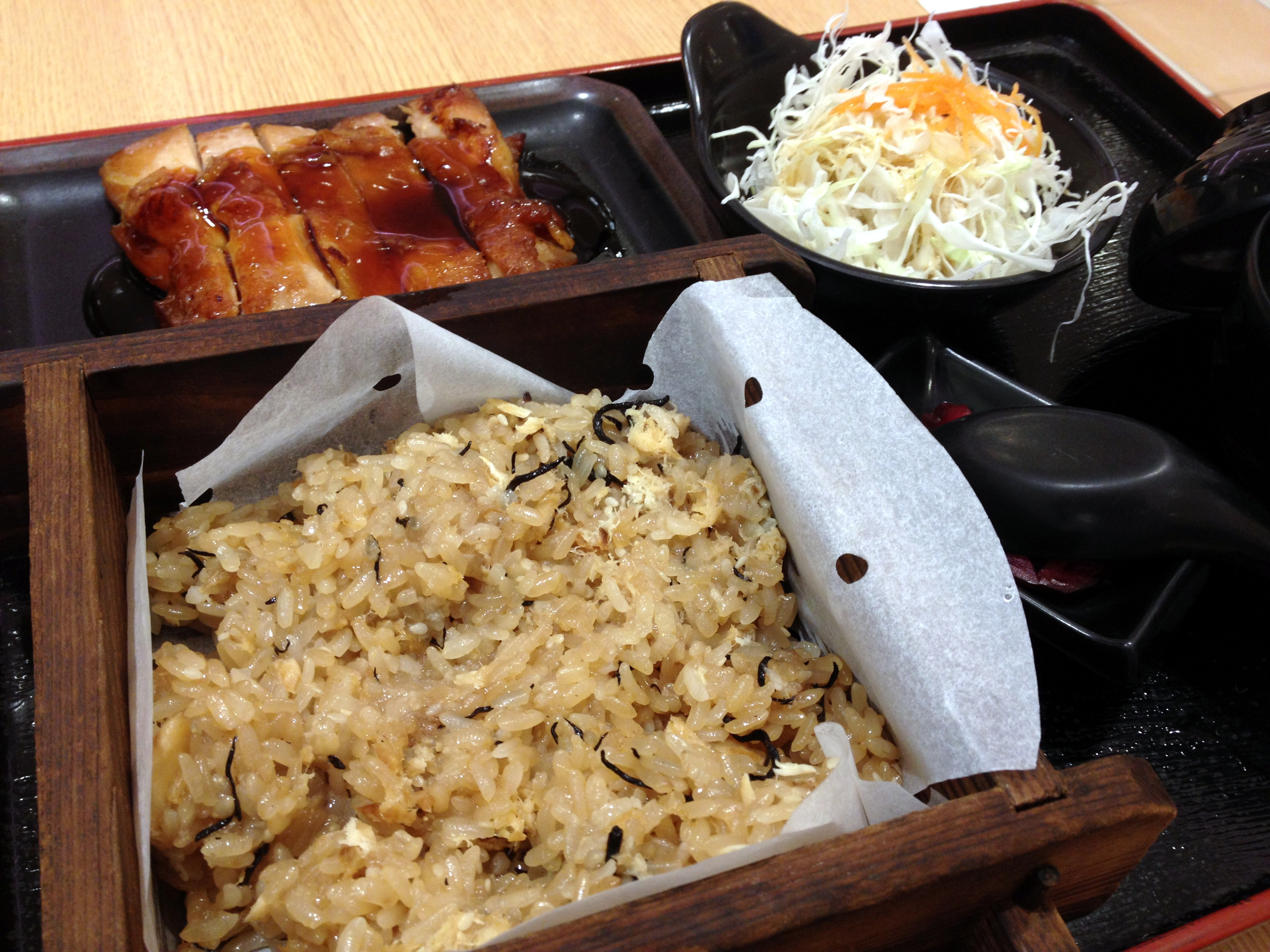
Okowa bento-styled meal (steamed glutinous rice with teriyaki chicken and cabbage) served in a restaurant

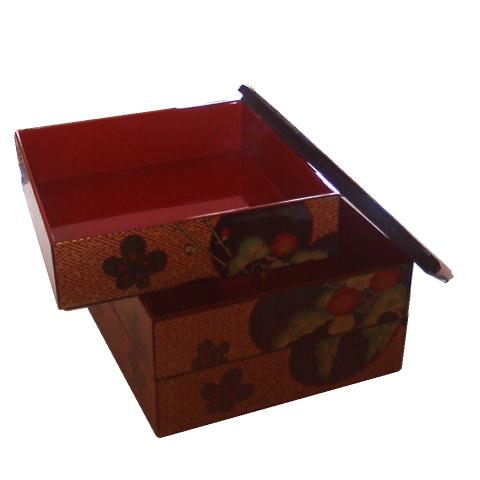
A set of stacking boxes for bento called jūbako

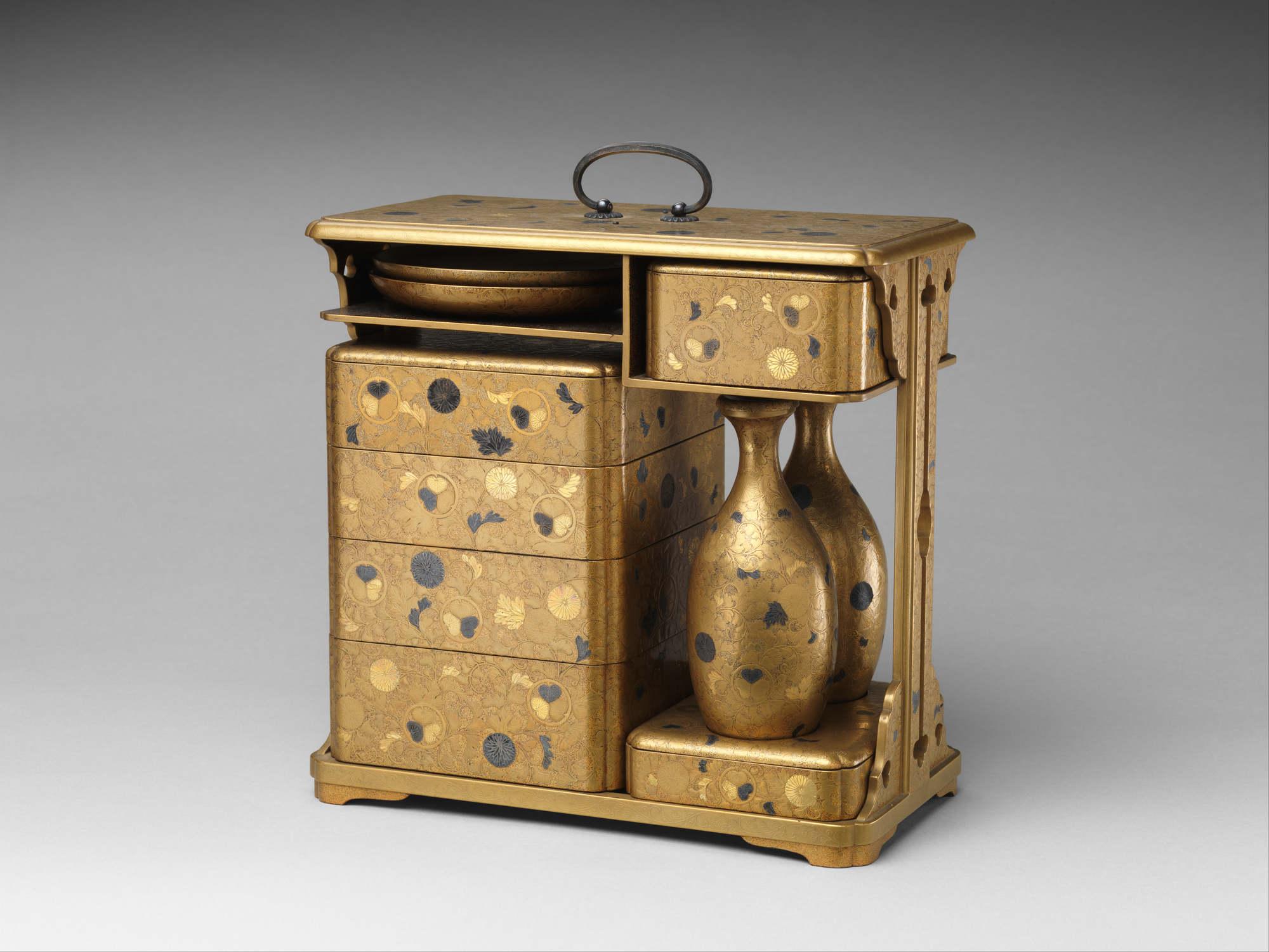
Sagejū, a historical picnic container set of jūbako

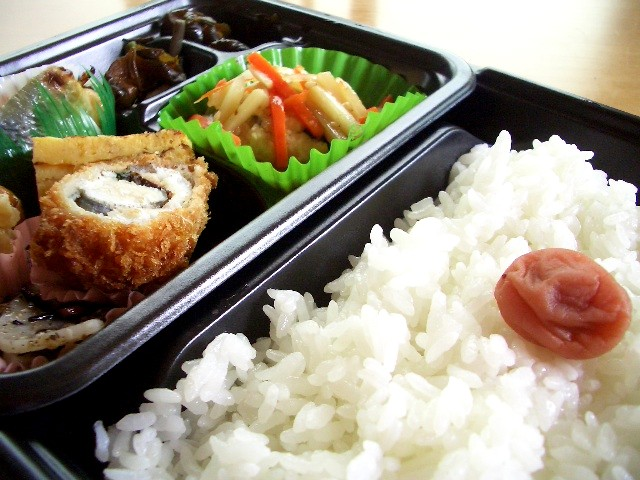
Makunouchi bento

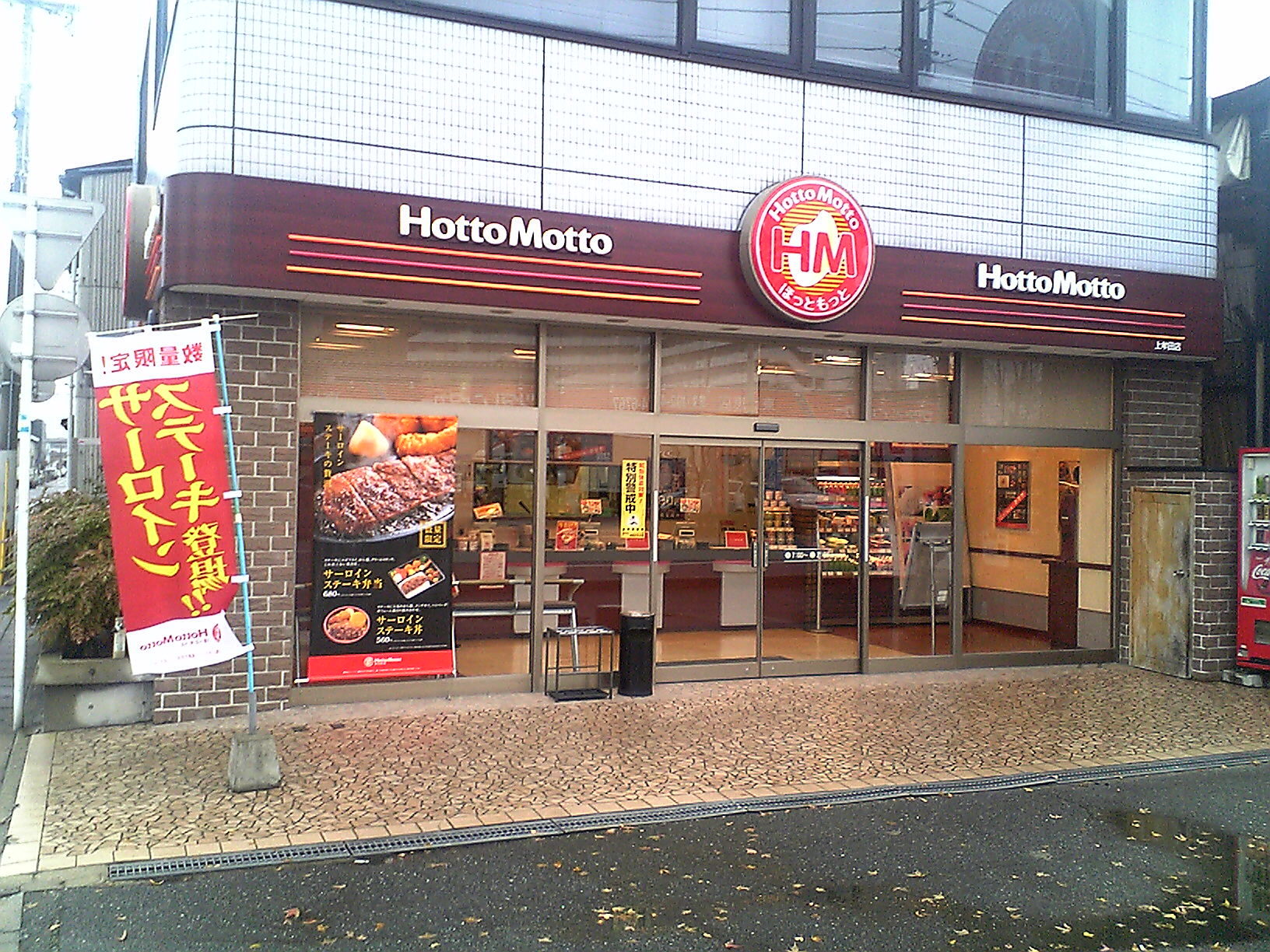
Hotto Motto, a take-out bento chain

== Scholarship ==
Many scholars have written about the bento since the late 20th century. The foundation of their approach is based on the idea that food can carry many different meanings.

In the 1970s, Chie Nakane used ekiben as a metaphor for group organization in Japan. By comparing this variant of bento to groups in Japan, she considered how different organizations in Japanese society often include identical components so as not to depend on any other groups for their success. In 1984, Ŏ-ryŏng Yi used bento to present tendencies towards reductionism in Japanese culture; all the food in a Japanese-style lunch box is only able to be reduced to fit in a little box due to it being Japanese food, as it naturally lends itself to being tightly packed. Roland Barthes, on the other hand, used a symbolic approach to describe the lack of a centrepiece in Japanese food. He described the distinct contents of a bento box as a multitude of fragments or ornaments that are combined to beautify each other. Joseph Jay Tobin in 1992 discussed how the meticulous assembly of individual bento boxes has been aided by the reinterpretation of Western goods, practices, and ideas through a process he classified as domestication.

== In other countries ==
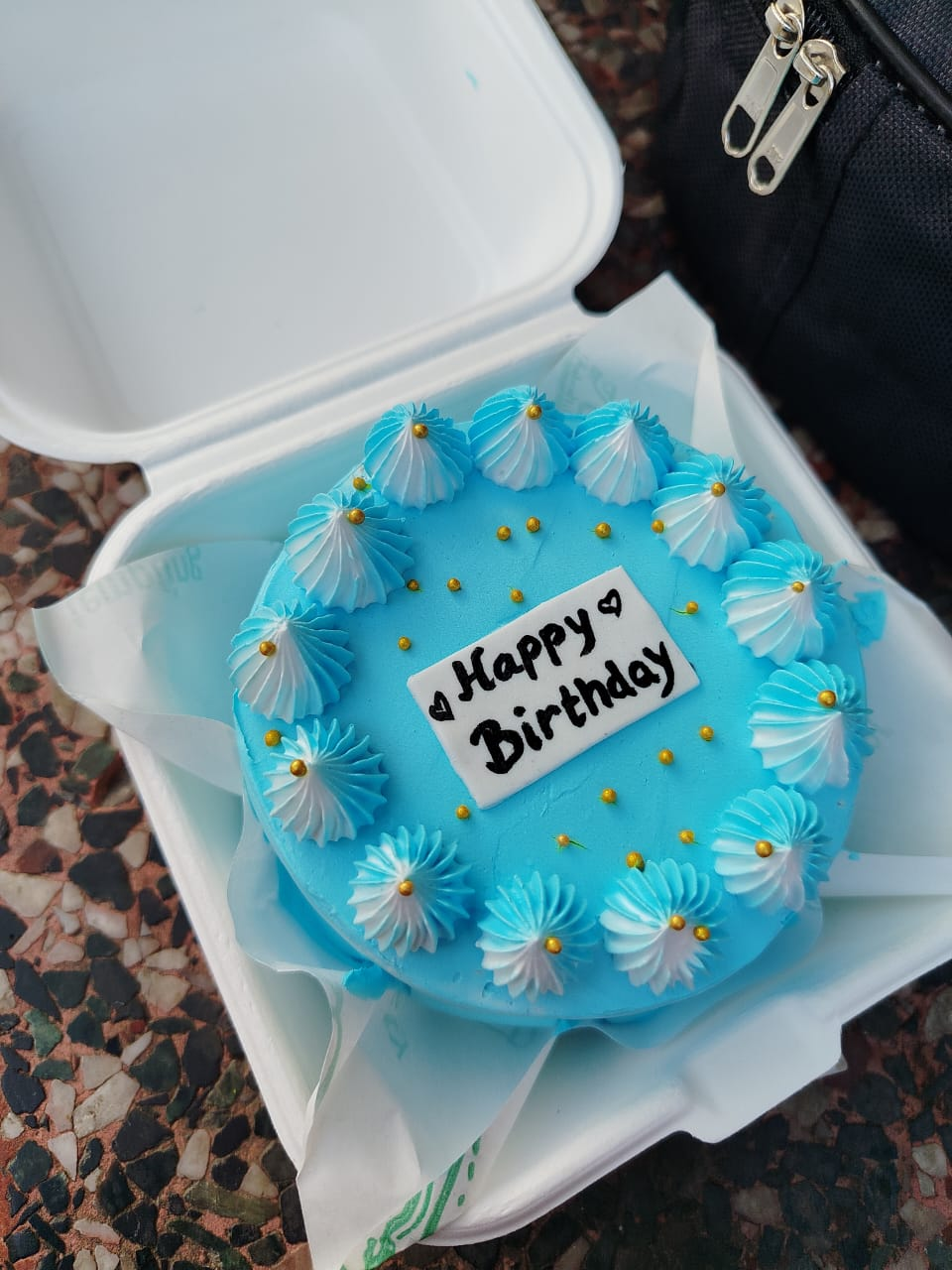
A small single-serving bento cake with a minimalist design in a small container from India

=== Taiwan ===
The bento made its way to Taiwan in the first half of the 20th century during the Japanese colonial period and remains popular to the present day. The Japanese name was borrowed into Taiwanese Hokkien (piān-tong) and Hakka (phien-tông). A modern Taiwanese bento always includes protein, such as a crispy fried chicken leg or a piece of grilled mackerel and marinated pork chop, as well as side dishes. Taiwan Railway Bento is a well known bento dish manufactured and distributed by the Taiwan Railway Corporation at major railway stations and in train cars. It is estimated that, with 5 million boxed meals sold per year, annual revenue from bento distribution amounts to 370 million NTD (about 10 million USD).

=== Korea ===
During the Japanese occupation of Korea, the Japanese bento, borrowed directly into Korean as bentto (벤또), was introduced to Korea. After the war, they were renamed dosirak, reviving an old Korean term for packed lunches.

Dosirak may be homemade or store-bought. They are similar to Chinese and Japanese variations. Dosirak is usually made with a few different vegetable and meat side dishes, often including a type of kimchi.

=== China ===
The Chinese word for boxed meals is héfàn (盒饭), though biàndāng as a re-borrowing from Japanese may also be used. There are numerous regional styles, ranging from Northeastern Chinese boxed meals to the Hong Kong "two dishes with rice" boxed meal. Packed meals would traditionally be carried in boxes known as shíhé (食盒, "food box"). Shíhé ranged from basic styles to elaborate, multi-tiered designs.

=== Singapore ===
In Singapore, such packed lunch boxes are often acculturated and localised with cuisines slightly different to Japan. These may include roasted pork (similar to char siu) and soy eggs, as well as fried rice. It has been a common method of meal preparation within Singaporean cuisine as early as the start of the 20th century, intensifying during the Japanese occupation and cultural influences in subsequent decades with Japanese-style bento also being common in the country today.

In 2021, the Singapore Food Tech Event showcased how bento of the future might look like for a sustainable food system.

=== India and Pakistan ===
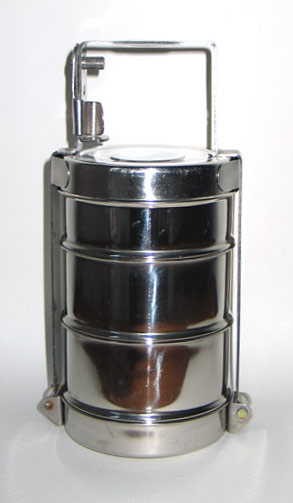
Dabba

People in India and Pakistan use a stainless-steel, multi-tiered lunchbox, a dabba, to carry home-cooked meals like roti, sabzi (vegetable cooked in gravy), rice, and dal to school or work, famously delivered by Mumbai and Karachi's dabbawalas using a unique system of local trains and cycles.

== See also ==
- Plate lunch
- Tiffin carrier
- TV dinner
- Field ration
- Dosirak, Korean equivalent
