= Dosirak =

Type of packed meal in Korea

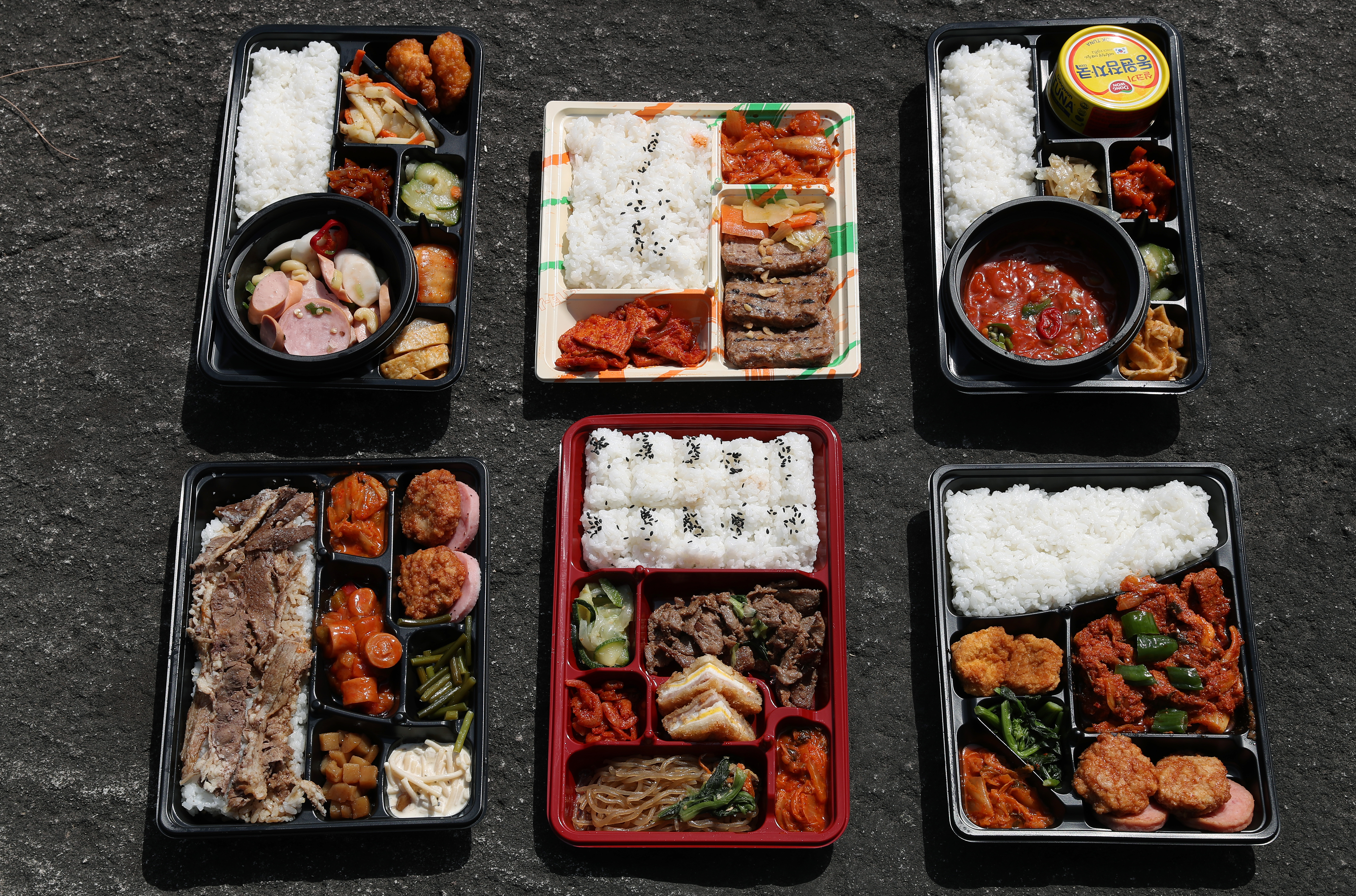
- A variety of dosirak sold in a convenience store
- Region or state: Korean peninsula
- Associated cuisine: Korean Cuisine

Korean name
- Hangul: 도시락
- RR: dosirak
- MR: tosirak
- IPA: to.ɕi.ɾak̚

Dosirak (Korean: 도시락) refers to a packed meal, often for lunch. It usually consists of bap (밥; lit. 'cooked rice') and several banchan (side dishes). The lunch boxes, also called dosirak or dosirak-tong (dosirak case), are typically plastic or thermo-steel containers with or without compartments or tiers. Dosirak is often home-made, but is also sold in train stations, convenience stores, and some restaurants.

Dosirak is derived from the Early Modern Korean word dosik (도슭). Records dating to the 18th century attest to this as well as other variations such as bapgori (밥고리), and bapdonggori (밥동고리). The practice of packing food as done with dosirak is not a unique practice to Korean cuisine, and the modern dosirak can be seen as the Korean form of lunch boxes.

== History ==
Unlike the more formal chanhap (찬합) enjoyed by the nobility, Joseon era peasants and soldiers would carry lunch in a simple woven bamboo or wood tumak (투막) box when expected to be outside the home during meal time. As Korea became more industrialized and the lunchboxes simplified, dosirak became the common definition of any lunchbox, used by the working classes as a quick and easy meal that could be eaten on the go.

During the Japanese occupation of Korea (1910-1945), Korean cuisine adopted Western food and drink, as well as some Japanese food items like norimaki sushi rolled in sheets of seaweed, popularized in Korea under the name of gimbap. These included the Japanese packed lunch bento, originally known in Korea simply as bentto (벤또).

Following the Korean War and post-war occupation, the Korean language purification movement led by Choe Hyeon-bae revived the Korean word dosirak to replace the Japanese-derived bentto. In this period, raw materials became scarce and cheap tin lunchboxes made from scrap metal were used to contain a simple meal of rice, banchan, and some protein. Parents would send their children to school with a lunch in these simple, aluminum boxes without dividers, and the food contained would invariably become jumbled together as the student travelled to school. During the winter, students would leave their dosirak on top of the radiator to keep them warm until lunchtime.

As Korea became more prosperous, affluent workers and students could afford to go out to eat for lunch, the humble dosirak fell out of favor as the province of poor. When health conscious modern Koreans began to revisit packed lunches, they began using the fancy divided Japanese style bento boxes to keep the meal's ingredients perfectly arranged and separate.

The mixed up taste of old style aluminum dosirak started to come back in favor in the early 2000s as nostalgic comfort food, a memory of the innocence of youth. Modern pocha reintroduced the dish as a contrast to the sterile Japanese bento and fancy Michelin starred restaurants, shaken at the table to simulate the mixing that would have occurred in transit.

== Varieties ==
Home-made dosirak is often packed in tiered lunch boxes that can separate bap (cooked rice) and banchan (side dishes). The guk (soup) tier, if included, is usually kept warm by insulation. Plastic or thermo-steel containers are most common, but combinations of wood and lacquer, ceramics and bamboo, as well as other materials, are also used.

Yennal-dosirak (옛날 도시락; lit. 'old-style dosirak') consists of (rice), stir-fried kimchi, egg-washed and pan-fried sausages, fried eggs, and shredded gim (seaweed), typically packed in a rectangular lunchbox made of tinplate or German silver. It is shaken with the lid on, thereby mixing the ingredients prior to eating. Gimbap-dosirak (김밥 도시락; lit. 'packed gimbap'), made with sliced gimbap (seaweed rolls), is often packed for picnics.

== Gallery ==
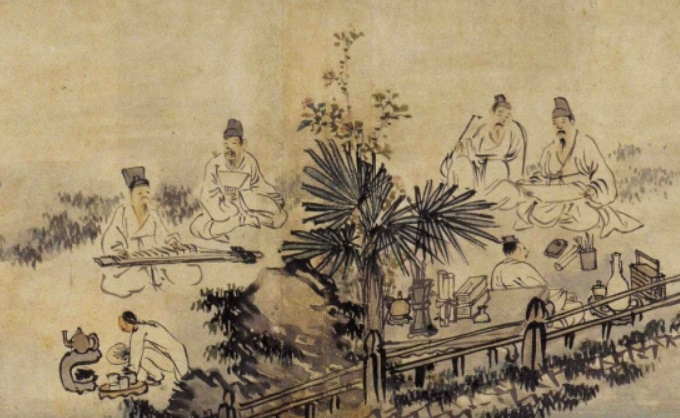
Seonbi's Lunch

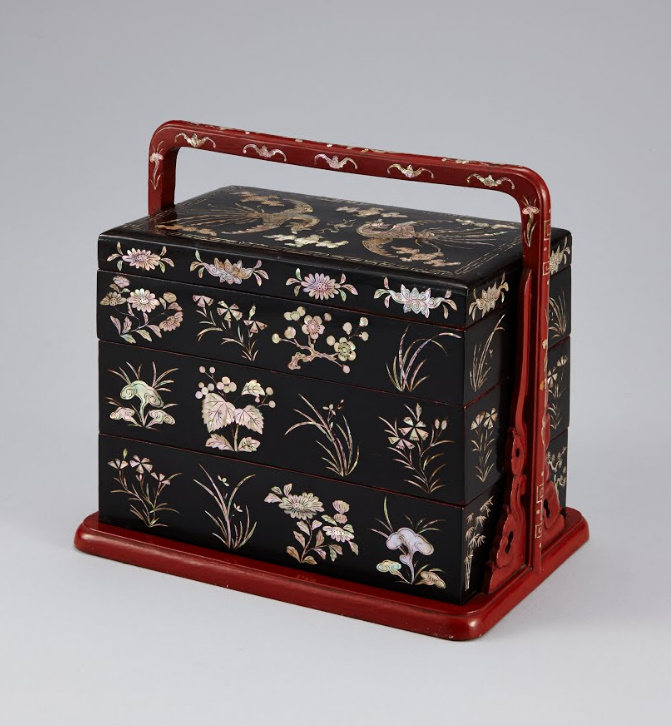
Pile type dosirak of the Joseon period

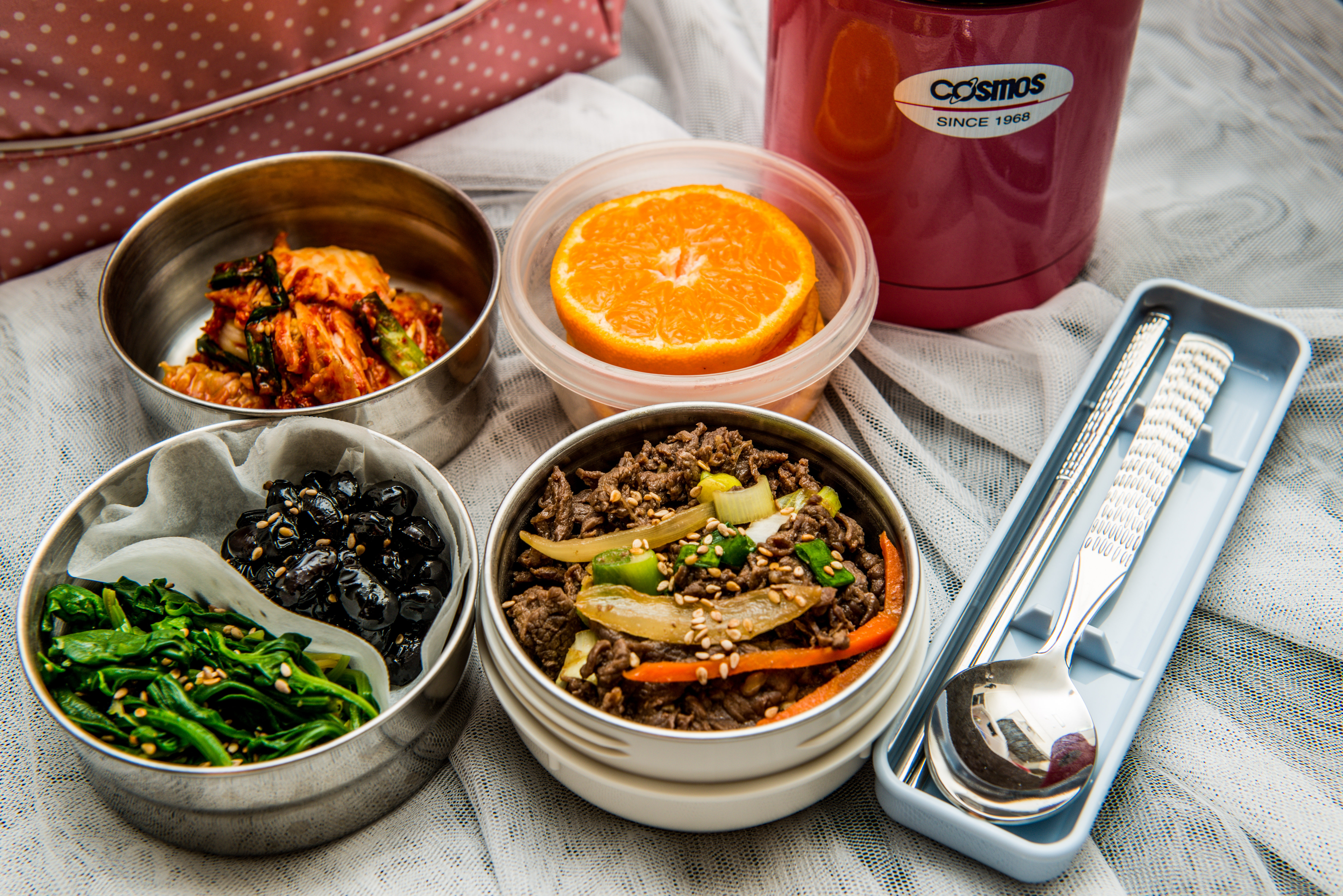
Home-made dosirak

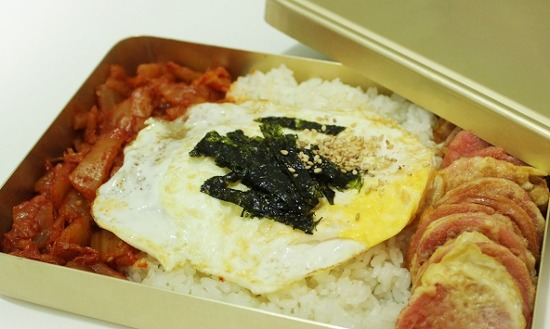
Yetnal-dosirak (old-time dosirak)

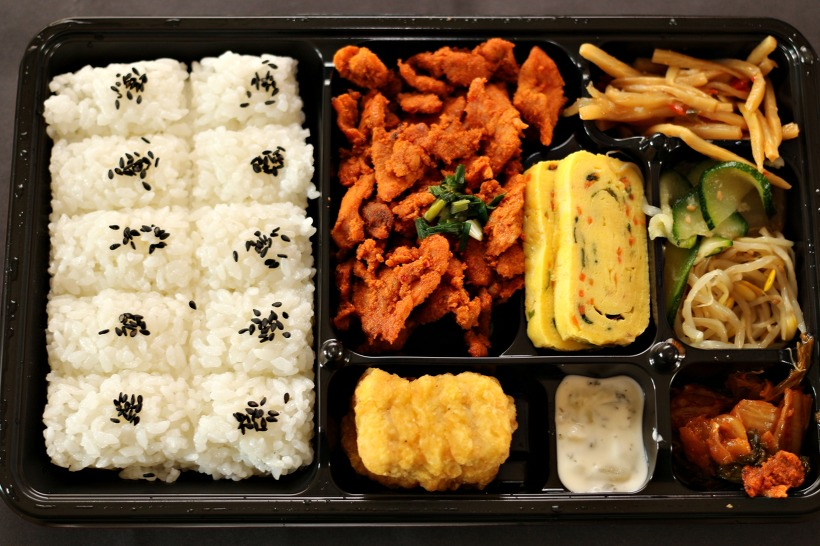
Dosirak sold in convenience stores

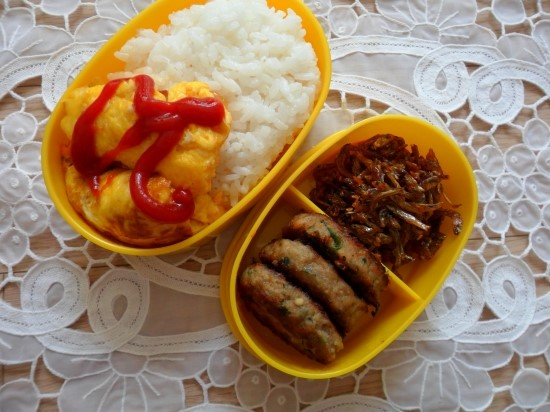
Simple dosirak in a plastic container

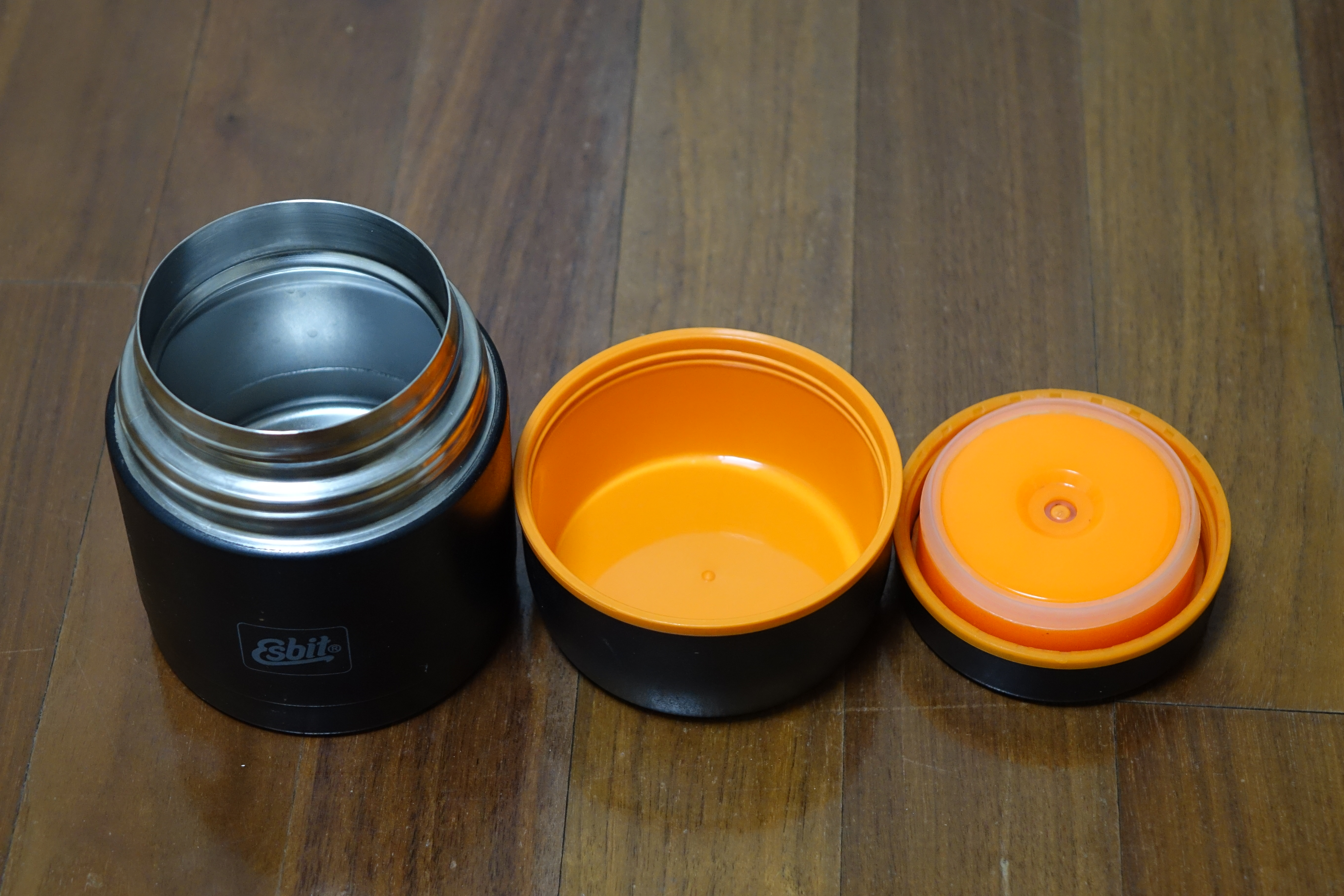
Thermal dosirak case

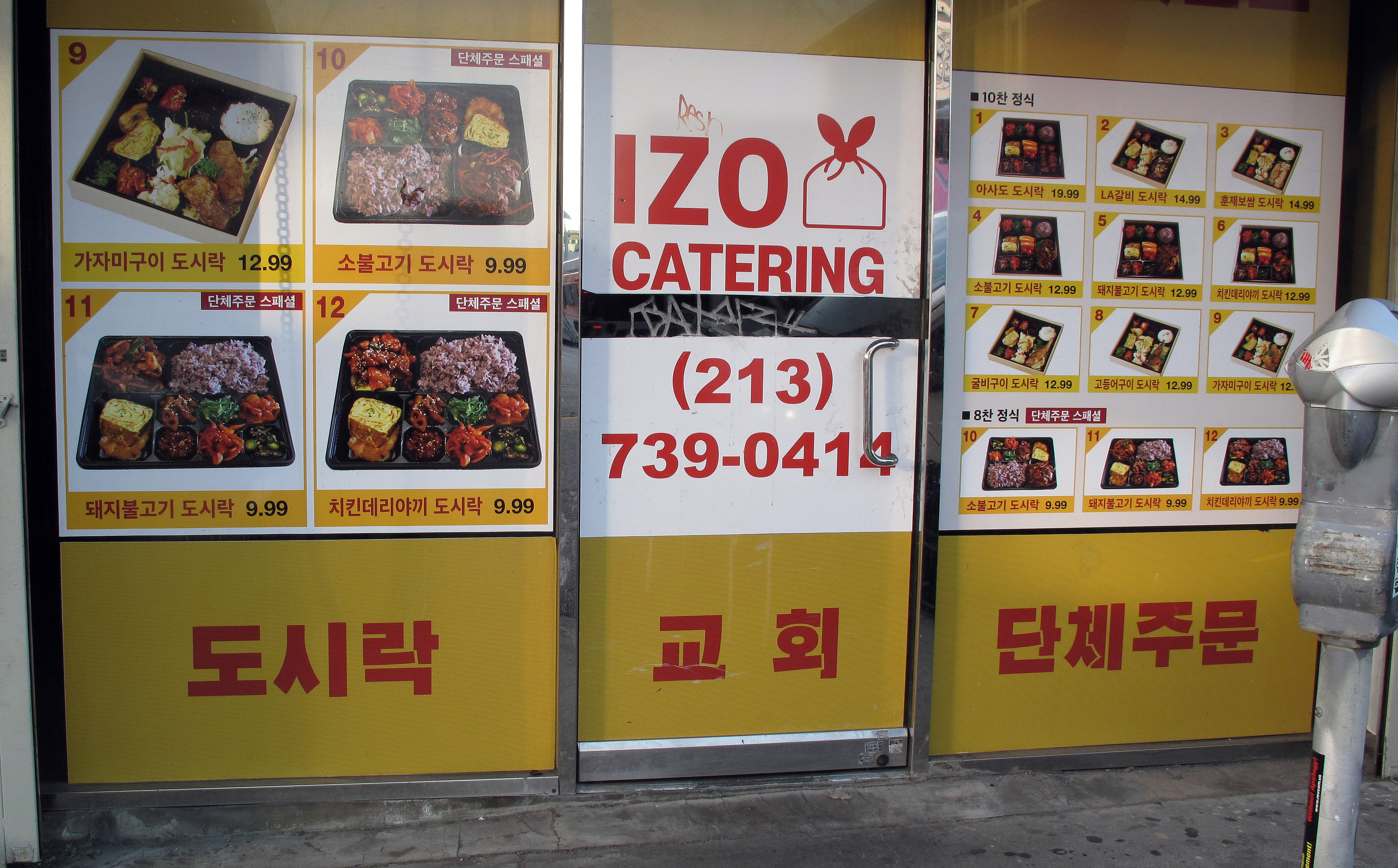
Catering company storefront, Koreatown, Los Angeles

== See also ==
- Bento (弁当)
- Biandang (便當)
- Dosirac (도시락)
- Lunch box
- Packed lunch
- Tiffin
