= Top Gear series 18 =

Top Gear
- Series 18
- Promotional poster
- Starring: Jeremy Clarkson; Richard Hammond; James May; The Stig
- No. of episodes: 8

Release
- Original network: BBC Two
- Original release: 28 December 2011 – 11 March 2012

Series chronology
- ← Previous; Series 17 Next → Series 19

Series 18 of Top Gear, a British motoring magazine and factual television programme, was broadcast in the United Kingdom on BBC Two during 2012, consisting of seven episodes that were aired between 29 January and 11 March; a feature-length special focused on the presenters doing a road trip across India, titled Top Gear: India Special, preceded the series' first episode, and was aired on 28 December 2011. This series' highlights included the presenters being involved in the filming of a car chase sequence, reviewing the Chinese car industry, making home-made mobility scooters, and examining the cars made by manufacturer Saab.

A special edition episode celebrating the Bond film series' 50th Anniversary, titled "50 Years of Bond Cars", was aired on 29 October 2012 and presented by Richard Hammond. In addition, BBC Children in Need 2012 featured a special "Star in a Reasonably Priced Car" segment as part of the charity's evening entertainment on 16 November 2012.

== Episodes ==
No. overall	No. in series	Reviews	Features/challenges	Guest(s)	Original release date	UK viewers (millions)
140	—	N/A – India Special	India Special: (Jaguar XJS Celebration • Rolls-Royce Silver Shadow • Rover Mini Cooper)	David Cameron (uncredited)	28 December 2011	6.61 (Note: 5.76 million on BBC Two, 849,000 on BBC HD.)
Seeking to help encourage trade with India, despite (the then) British Prime Minister David Cameron wishing they won't, the boys head out and see if they can promote British goods to the Indian public, each taking with them a British car that they hope will help with the job – May chose the luxury of a Rolls-Royce Silver Shadow, Clarkson opts for the stylish Jaguar XJS Celebration, and Hammond takes the classic Mini Cooper. On their "trade mission", the presenters attempt to speed up Dabbawala delivery in Mumbai with little success, bring motorsports to Jaipur with a hill-climbing event, host an ambitious but rubbish trade fair in Delhi, before modifying their cars for a trek up into the mountainous, Himalayan region of Himachal Pradesh and their final destination of Shipki La. Note: The closing credits replaced the first name of the presenters and crew members with an Indian Cuisine theme. The vehicles used in this special were left at their final destination on plinths, but were removed afterwards due to legal complications.
141	1	None	"Supercars Across Italy": (Lamborghini Aventador • McLaren MP4-12C • Noble M600)	will.i.am	29 January 2012	6.21 (Note: 5.18 million on BBC Two, 1.03 million on BBC HD.)
There's a supercar shootout in Italy, and the presenters are determined to find out which of the three mid-engined supercars competing will come out a winner – May expects the McLaren MP4-12C will come out the victor, Clarkson looks to proving that the Lamborghini Aventador is the best, and Hammond believes it will be the Noble M600. On a roadtrip across the country starting at Lecce, the trio subject their supercars to a series of challenges, including seeing how close they dare get to their car's top speed while finding out their fuel consumption in the process, race to Rome and a restaurant in the centre of the city, and finally take on a time trial test at the famous Imola Grand Prix track, the Autodromo Enzo e Dino Ferrari – a track that has had its toll on many F1 drivers, including both Roland Ratzenberger and the legendary Ayrton Senna dying in accidents during the 1994 San Marino Grand Prix. Elsewhere, Black Eyed Peas frontman, will.i.am, takes the Kia out on a wet track.
142	2	Mercedes-Benz SLS AMG Roadster	Clarkson and May examine China's car industry in Beijing • Hammond learns about NASCAR racing in Texas	Matt LeBlanc • Jimmie Johnson • Jeff Gordon • Juan Pablo Montoya • Kyle Petty	5 February 2012	6.25 (Note: 5.29 million on BBC Two, 963,000 on BBC HD.)
Clarkson and May head to China to explore the country's merging car industry in response to the assertion that everyone will be driving Chinese cars in five years, where they encounter facsimiles of popular car designs from other countries, discover how the automotive populace exploded in size, and meet with The Stig's rather aggressive, Chinese cousin. Elsewhere, Hammond explores the world of NASCAR by travelling to the Texas Motor Speedway for the AAA Texas 500 and interviewing some notable NASCAR drivers. The Mercedes-Benz SLS AMG Roadster is given a slidey review by Clarkson on the test track, and former Friends star and car lover, Matt LeBlanc, is in the hot seat of the Kia Cee'd. Note: The closing credits were played out with a Mandarin-styled version of the programme's theme song. Three Chinese actors concluded the show in the place of the presenters, but were not credited.
143	3	Vauxhall Corsa VXR Nürburgring • Fiat Panda	Creating the climactic car chase for The Sweeney (Jaguar XFR • Ford Focus)	Ryan Reynolds • Ray Winstone • Plan B • Nick Love • Paul Anderson • Kevin Michaels	12 February 2012	6.16 (Note: 5.13 million on BBC Two, 1.03 million on BBC HD.)
Believing they could make great car chases for movies, Clarkson and Hammond are invited to provide assistance in directing one for the remake of The Sweeney. Working alongside the film's stars, Ray Winstone and Plan B, Clarkson attempts to prove that dynamic camera usage and timed moves are what can make a good chase sequence, while Hammond tries to show that it should have exciting (if unrealistic) stunts including car jumps. Meanwhile, May takes a look at the Vauxhall Corsa VXR Nürburgring Edition and the new Fiat Panda on the track, and Ryan Reynolds is the latest star going fast in the reasonably priced car. Note: Top Gear were invited to help with the car chase scenes for the 2012 film The Sweeney, with the rushes of their work shown in the episode; their involvement was not officially credited upon the film's release.
144	4	Fisker Karma • Ferrari FF • Bentley Continental GT V8	Build and test off-road mobility scooters in the countryside	Michael Fassbender • Brian Johnson	19 February 2012	5.28 (Note: 4.30 million on BBC Two, 982,000 on BBC HD.)
The trio see if they can make their own mobility scooters and motorised wheelchairs that can be good in the town as well as being capable of going off-road, and put them through their paces in the Welsh countryside with a race against a team of three wounded soldiers in standard models. Meanwhile, Clarkson heads to Arjeplog in Northern Sweden to pit the Ferrari FF against the Bentley Continental GT V8 in a race on an ice replica of the Silverstone F1 circuit, May heads to Florida to test out the latest sports Plug-in hybrid car, the Fisker Karma, while pitting it against AC/DC front man Brian Johnson and his 1928 Bentley Vanden Plas LeMans Tourer, and Michael Fassbender arrives on the track to do a lap in the reasonably priced car.
145	5	Maserati GranTurismo MC Stradale • Mercedes-Benz C63 AMG Coupe Black Series	Retrospective on Swedish car maker Saab • Rally-spec Škoda vs jet-powered flying man	Matt Smith • Yves Rossy • Toni Gardemeister	26 February 2012	6.12 (Note: 5.25 million on BBC Two, 872,000 on BBC HD.)
As a final tribute to the sixty years of production that Saab has performed before its closure, Clarkson and May look back at some of the bad ideas the company made, and some of the very good ones they made, including how much emphasis they put on the safety of a car's occupant. Meanwhile, the Maserati GranTurismo MC Stradale and the Mercedes-Benz C63 AMG Coupe Black Series are tested by Clarkson out on the track, Hammond sees if Finnish world rally driver, Toni Gardemeister, can beat Yves Rossy, the world's first jet propelled man, in a Skoda Fabia S2000 around an eight-mile special Welsh Rally Stage (episode from "At the Movies" DVD Special), and Eleventh Doctor, Matt Smith, swaps the TARDIS for the Kia Cee'd. Note: Due to scheduling issues, Matt Smith's interview and timed lap were conducted during the filming of the previous episode.
146	6	"Aero-engined" Bentley, Brutus	Test of three stripped track cars: (KTM X-Bow • Caterham R500 • Morgan Three Wheeler)	Alex James	4 March 2012	5.81 (Note: 4.83 million on BBC Two, 978,000 on BBC HD.)
The presenters head out to Donington Park to test out three stripped-out track cars – May believes it cannot be anything other than the Caterham Seven, Clarkson opts to show that it is the KTM X-Bow, and Hammond attempts to prove that it has to be the Morgan Three Wheeler. Along with a series of challenges on the Park's circuit, the trio also see how practical they are as everyday cars by using them to drive to work. Elsewhere, Clarkson re-enacts the 'Battle of Britain' at the Track as a modern recreation of a classic 1920s Bentley model, faces up against the fury of a home-made German car, Brutus, while Alex James of Blur takes to the track with the Kia Cee'd. Note: The main feature film originally was planned to feature Clarkson in a BAC Mono, but it was replaced with the KTM after breaking down before filming.
147	7	BMW M5	Rallycross cheaper than playing golf? (BMW 328i • Toyota MR2 • Citroën Saxo VTS) • May's childhood dream car: Ferrari 250 GT California.	Slash • Kimi Räikkönen • Chris Evans	11 March 2012	6.15 (Note: 5.13 million on BBC Two, 1.02 million on BBC HD.)
The trio show that you can have more fun by doing Rallycross motor racing for the same amount of money you could spend playing golf, with Clarkson racing in a BMW 328i, Hammond a Citroën Saxo VTS, and May a Toyota MR2. Elsewhere, Hammond takes a look at the new BMW M5 at the track, May gets his chance to see his childhood dream car, the £5.6 million Ferrari 250 GT California, at Chris Evans' garage, while Kimi Räikkönen talks about his return to F1 before taking out the old Liana on the track, and Guns N' Roses guitarist Slash shows how good he is the current reasonably priced car. Note: The closing credits were played out with Slash's rendition of the Top Gear theme song.

=== Special episode ===
Title	Guest(s)	Original air date	UK viewers (million)
"50 Years of Bond Cars"	Guy Hamilton, Roger Moore, Ola Rapace, Michael G. Wilson, Ben Collins, Daniel Craig	29 October 2012	5.48 (Note: 4.71 million on BBC Two, 768,000 on BBC HD.)
To celebrate the 50th Anniversary of the Bond film series, and the release of the film Skyfall, Richard Hammond examines the best of the Bond cars, meets with two of the actors to play James Bond, and attempts to recreate some of the unique cars abilities, including converting a car to operate like a submarine.

=== Spin-Off Special ===
Title	Feature	Guest(s)	Original air date	UK viewers (million)
"Children in Need 2012 Special"	Children in Need 2012 does 'Star in a Reasonably Priced Car'	Bill Turnbull • Sophie Raworth • Fiona Bruce	16 November 2012	8.22
As a special segment for BBC Children in Need 2012, three of the BBC's newsreaders, Bill Turnbull, Sophie Raworth, and Fiona Bruce, head to the test track and see who is fastest with the reasonably priced car of Top Gear, the Kia Cee'd.

== Notes ==
The viewing figures shown in the Episode Table above, are a combination of the figures from the BBC Two broadcast and the BBC HD broadcast.
