= Top Gear: India Special =

- Top Gear episode
- Episode no.: Series 17; Episode 7
- Presented by: Jeremy Clarkson; Richard Hammond; James May
- Original air date: 28 December 2011
- Running time: 90 minutes

Episode chronology
← Previous "Series 17, Episode 6"	Next → "Series 18, Episode 1"

"Top Gear: India Special" is a Top Gear Christmas special first broadcast on 28 December 2011 after which the next series began on 29 January 2012.

== Introduction ==
The special is an episode featuring a route across India, one of the many countries Top Gear plans to visit over the course of the new series, according to Jeremy Clarkson. Shooting in India began on 2 October, with the first leg of the shoot beginning in suburbs of Mumbai.

== Mission ==
This episode was a mission to promote Britain to the Indian public. The opening sequence of the show shows the Top Gear team in Downing Street opening a letter by then Prime Minister David Cameron refusing their request to go to India on an official trade mission and told them to go to Mexico for a fence mending trip. Cameron appears for a separately filmed one-line cameo, telling them to—"Stay away from India!" (the remark caused a controversy in India). Despite this, they decide to go anyway: Jeremy Clarkson in a 1995 Jaguar XJS Celebration, Richard Hammond in a 2000 Rover Mini Cooper Sport, and James May in a 1975 Rolls-Royce Silver Shadow.

== Episode ==
No. overall	No. in series	Title	Reviews	Guest	Original release date	UK viewers (millions)
139	—	"India Special"	None	David Cameron (uncredited)	28 December 2011	5.76
The trio visit India in an attempt to improve economic relations between Britain and India. The opening sequence of the episode shows Clarkson, Hammond and May outside 10 Downing Street, opening a letter sent by David Cameron refusing their request to go to India on an official trade mission. Cameron then appears for a separately filmed one-line cameo—saying "Stay away from India!" Despite this, the trio decide to go ahead with the trip. The trio arrive in India and begin by arriving in their cars. Jeremy Clarkson chose a Jaguar XJS Celebration, Richard Hammond chose a Rover Mini Cooper, and James May chose a Rolls-Royce Silver Shadow. Challenges: Mumbai – In Mumbai, the trio aimed to beat the efficiency of the dabbawala by using a car instead of a train. The mission fails when Clarkson, in a rush to beat the train, did not take enough cargo, leaving Hammond to carry Clarkson's load as well as his own. Hammond 'accidentally' loses and subsequently ruins some of his cargo, and May, trying to take a ring road approach to the station, takes a wrong turn and ends up in the countryside. From there, they take a train to Jaipur. May misses the train, so as Clarkson and Hammond arrive in Jaipur first, they sabotage his Rolls-Royce's air conditioner (like they did in American Special).; Jaipur – The trio host a motorsport challenge with local people and drive to Delhi. In the name of diplomacy, the presenters agree to set times near the top of the leaderboard but not to win; but in the end, Clarkson disregards the promise he made to the other presenters and takes the top of the leaderboard, rendering the event a diplomatic failure.; Delhi – The mission was to host a trade fair. It is hosted in the exclusive embassy quarter Chanakyapuri and subsequently fails when a massive firework set up by Clarkson goes badly wrong and explodes into the building where the fair was being hosted, which causes the guests to leave, which at first they cannot do because when Hammond parked their cars, he simply threw the keys into a bucket and could not remember whose key was whose.; Afterwards, they drive into the Himalayan region of Himachal Pradesh past Shimla towards the border with China at Shipki La to test their vehicles on the high terrain and played a game of cricket with local people. They commented on how their trade missions had been a failure but that the cars selected had tolerated the harsh road conditions they were not designed for. None of them broke down during the trip and the only problems encountered with the cars were due to either sabotage from the other presenters or due to an attempt to help each other out – in particular when Hammond tried to winch the Rolls-Royce up a hill towards the end, the winch sheared off most of the front of his Mini. The show finishes by showing the cars left at a hill on plinths with the Union Flag on them. During the final leg of the journey, Clarkson plays Genesis' song "I Know What I Like (In Your Wardrobe)" out of his loudspeaker, a band that Hammond hates. This is a repeat of what he used as a prank in the Middle East special. Also, Clarkson and Hammond pull another prank on May by connecting his Rolls-Royce's brake light switch to the car horn (thus every time James would brake, he would also blow the car horn). The crew members names in the credits are given Indian cuisine themes (e.g. Tim Aloo Gobi) while the out-of-control lawn mower (advertised by May in the trade fair) rolls slowly past.
