= Tiffin carrier =

Lunch box used widely in Asia and the Caribbean

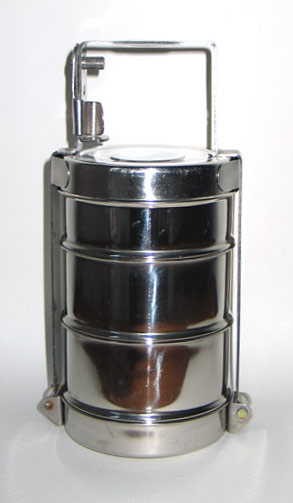
A dabba, or Indian-style tiffin carrier

Tiffin carriers or dabbas are a kind of lunch box used widely in Asia and the Caribbean for tiffin meals. From India and Pakistan, they spread to Malaysia and Singapore and to Trinidad and Tobago.

In the Indian city of Mumbai and the Pakistani city of Karachi, there is a complex and efficient delivery system that regularly delivers hot lunches packed in dabbas to city office workers from their suburban homes or from a caterer. It uses delivery workers known as dabbawalas.

The book Tiffin: An Untold Story covers 172 tiffin carriers, some over a century old.

== Synonymous terms ==
In Cambodia, tiffin carriers are known as Chan Srak (Khmer: ចានស្រាក់), in Hokkien they are called Uánn-tsân (Chinese: 碗層), in Indonesian as rantang; mangkuk tingkat (tiered bowls) in Malay; while in Thai they are known as Pin To (Thai: ปิ่นโต [ˈpìn ˈtoː]). In Arab countries they are called safartas (سفرطاس, from Turkish "sefer tası" meaning 'travel bowls'). The Hungarian word for a tiffin box is éthordó (food carrier).

== Design and materials ==
Normally these containers come with two or three tiers, although more elaborate versions can have four. The bottom tier, sometimes larger than the others, is the one usually used for rice. Tiffin carriers are opened by unlocking a small catch on either side of the handle. Tiffin carriers are generally made out of steel and sometimes of aluminium, but enamel and plastic versions have been made by European companies.

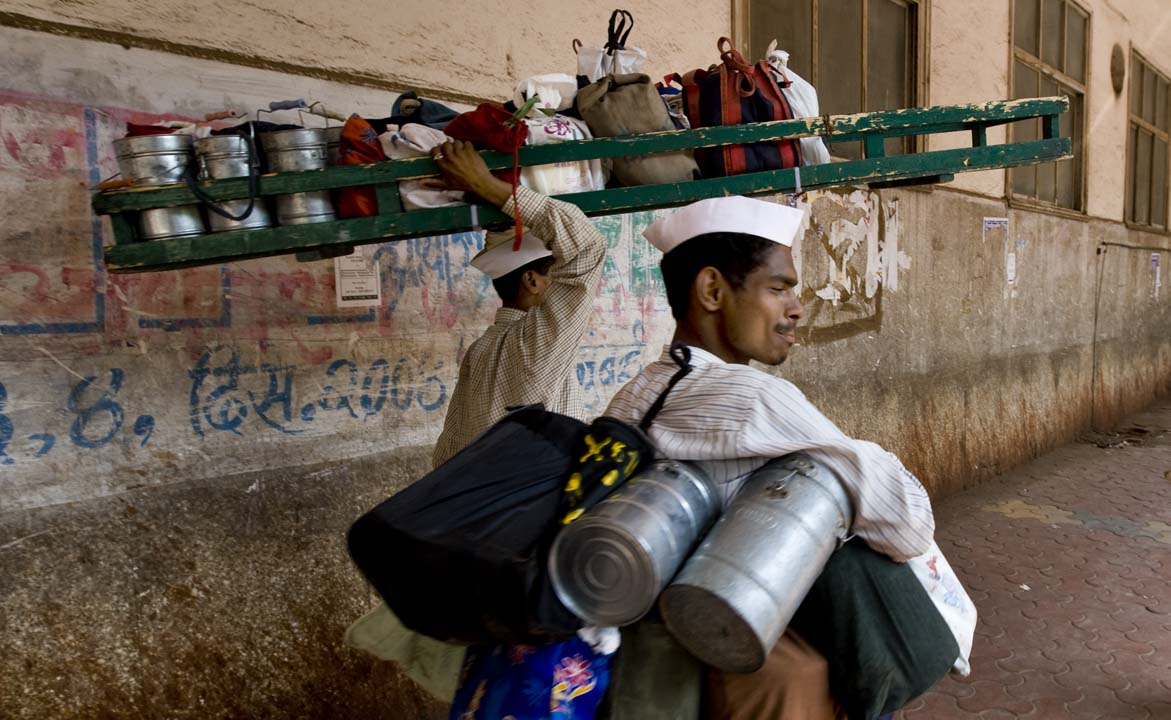
Two dabbawalas in Mumbai delivering meals packed in tiffin carriers

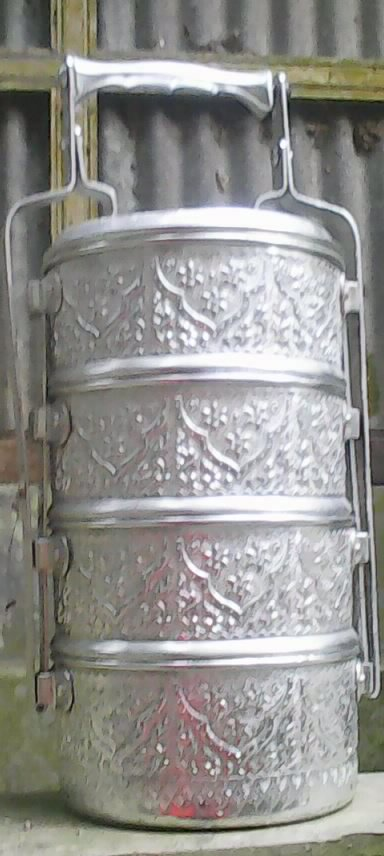
Thai tiffin box in Bangladesh.

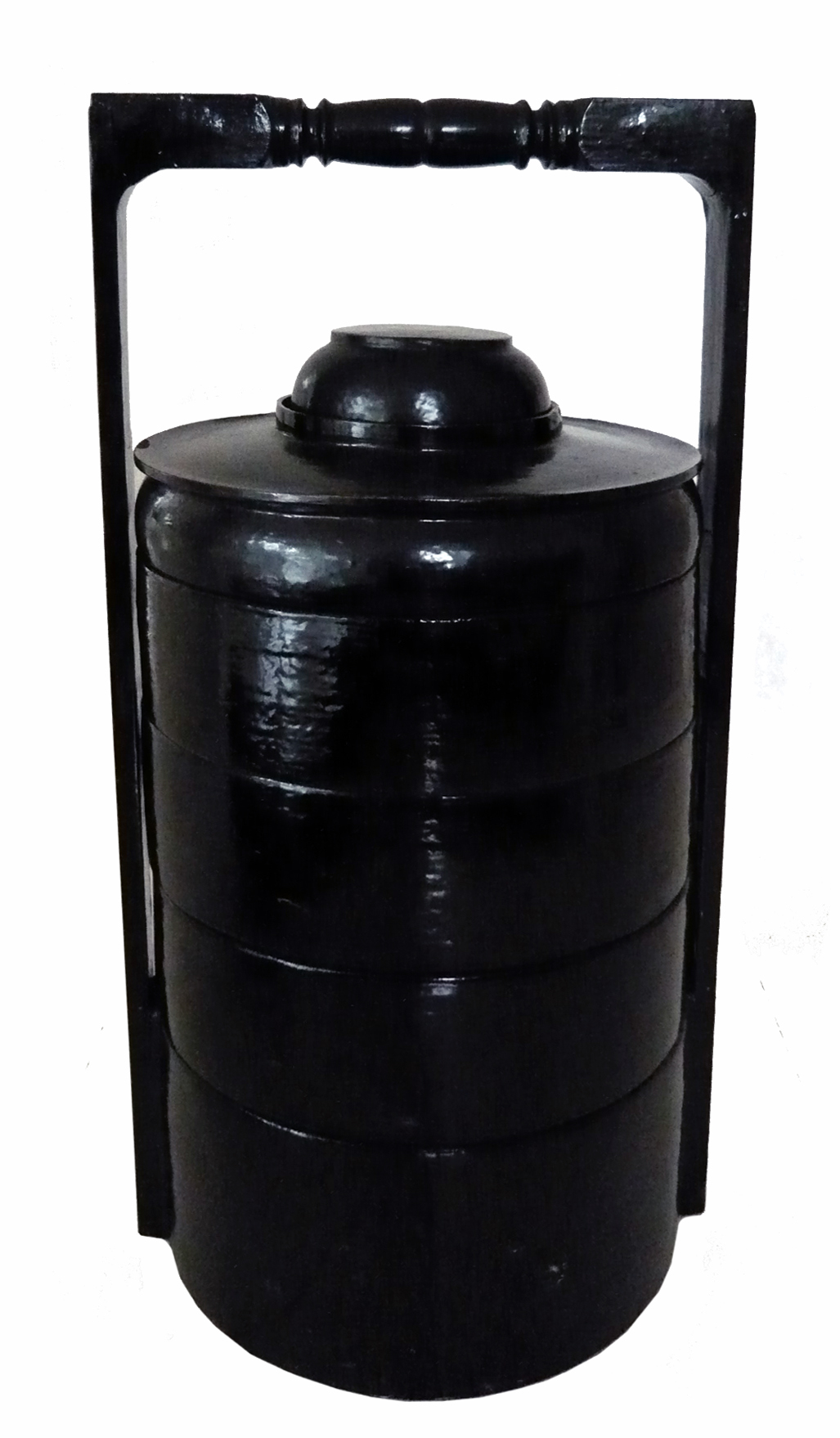
Tiffin carrier, Burmese Lacquerware

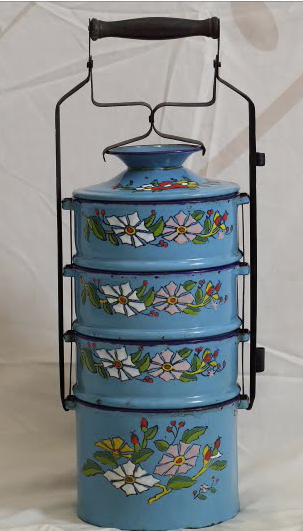
Malaysia, Peranakan tiffin carrier

== See also ==
- Dabbawala
- Lunch box
- Sagejū, historical Japanese picnic container set to carry bento
- The Lunchbox (2013 Indian film)

== Bibliography ==
- J. Prakash & M. Punita (2020) Tiffin: An Untold Story
