= Top Gear series 17 =

Top Gear
- Series 17
- Promotional poster
- Starring: Jeremy Clarkson; Richard Hammond; James May; The Stig
- No. of episodes: 6

Release
- Original network: BBC Two
- Original release: 26 June – 31 July 2011

Series chronology
- ← Previous; Series 16 Next → Series 18

Series 17 of Top Gear, a British motoring magazine and factual television programme, was broadcast in the United Kingdom on BBC Two during 2011, consisting of six episodes that were aired between 26 June and 31 July. This series' highlights included the presenters making their own trains with cars and caravans, and using second-hand military vehicles to demolish houses. The seventeenth series faced criticism over its review of electric cars by attempting to mislead viewers.

== Episodes ==
No. overall	No. in series	Reviews	Features/challenges	Guest(s)	Original release date	UK viewers (millions)
134	1	Marauder • BMW 1 Series M Coupe	50th Birthday of the Jaguar E-Type • Mini John Cooper Works WRC with Amy Williams	Alice Cooper • Amy Williams • Kris Meeke	26 June 2011	6.22 (Note: 5.27 million on BBC Two, 950,000 on BBC HD.)
Hammond travels to South Africa to test out the Marauder, a South African military vehicle, to work out the pros and cons of owning one, while May returns to Lillehammer in Norway to see if the car can reclaim its honour, by racing a MINI John Cooper Works WRC driven by MINI test driver Kris Meeke against skeleton sled racer Amy Williams, on the same course as the bobsleigh vs. car race. Meanwhile, Clarkson tests out the BMW 1 Series M Coupe, and pays homage to the Jaguar E-type by celebrating its 50th birthday while also looking at its updated, 21st century successor – the Eagle Speedster. Hard rock musician Alice Cooper has a go at driving around the track in the Kia Cee'd.
135	2	Aston Martin Virage	High-performance hatchbacks in Lucca and around the Monaco Grand Prix track: (Citroën DS3 Racing • Fiat 500 Abarth Convertible • Renault Sport Clio 200 Cup)	Ross Noble • Flavio Briatore • Christian Horner • Bernie Ecclestone	3 July 2011	5.72 (Note: 4.84 million on BBC Two, 880,000 on BBC HD.)
The trio head to Northern Italy for a road trip towards the Riviera, to see which of the latest hot hatchbacks is the best – Clarkson believes he has found the perfect hatchback in the Citroën DS3 Racing, May attempts to prove it is the Renault Sport Clio 200 Cup, while Hammond aims to show that the Fiat 500 Abarth Convertible is the best. In a series of challenges on their road trip, the trio try to get out of Lucca, go on a scavenger hunt, before heading for Monaco during the Monaco Grand Prix to see whose is fastest around the Circuit de Monaco (with a little training from some special helpers). Meanwhile, May goes on a rant about what is wrong with recent Aston Martins before seeing if the Aston Martin Virage is any different, and comedian Ross Noble sets out to make a fast lap in the Kia.
136	3	McLaren MP4-12C • Range Rover Evoque	Examine toughness of the Range Rover Evoque in Las Vegas • Second-hand bargains for the price of the Nissan Pixo (Mercedes-Benz CL600 • BMW 850Ci)	Sebastian Vettel	10 July 2011	6.55 (Note: 5.41 million on BBC Two, 1.14 million on BBC HD.)
Clarkson and Hammond see if there is a good second-hand bargain for the same price as a Nissan Pixo – Clarkson believes it might be a nine-year-old Mercedes-Benz CL600 he bought, while Hammond seeks to prove the seventeen-year-old BMW 850Ci he purchased is the one. Elsewhere, May ventures to Nevada to test out the sustainability of the Range Rover Evoque before chauffeuring a "megastar" across Las Vegas, the McLaren MP4-12C is put through its paces by Clarkson on the track against its main rival, the Ferrari 458 Italia, and Formula 1 world champion, Sebastian Vettel, sees if he's got what it takes to set a fast time in the old Suzuki Liana.
137	4	Jaguar XKR-S • Nissan GT-R	Make a train out of a specially modified car and caravans as carriages: (Jaguar XJ-S Convertible • Audi S8)	Rowan Atkinson	17 July 2011	7.14 (Note: 6.07 million on BBC Two, 1.07 million on BBC HD.)
The trio see if they can find a cheaper alternative to expensive carriage trains, but an argument over their initial creation leads to them having a race to see if Hammond and May's "traditional" train – a 4WD Audi S8 pulling four caravan "carriages" – can reach Loughborough Central railway station, before Clarkson's "Sports Train" – a Jaguar XJ-S Convertible pulling an open-top, four-man carriage. Elsewhere, the Jaguar XKR-S and the Nissan GT-R are tested out on the track by Clarkson, while comedian Rowan Atkinson previews his new film Johnny English Reborn, as well as talking about the prototype V16 engine used in the film's Rolls-Royce Phantom Coupé and his love of cars, before lapping the circuit in the Kia Cee'd.
138	5	Lotus T125 • Jensen Interceptor	Demolish a house with second-hand military equipment vs demolition experts	Bob Geldof • Jean Alesi	24 July 2011	6.13 (Note: 5.01 million on BBC Two, 1.12 million on BBC HD.)
The boys are challenged to a race by a group of professional demolishers to see who can be the first to knock down a row of houses zoned for demolition. After heading to Albania and failing to knock a test house with the standard machinery, the trio decide to tackle the challenge with a range of heavy-duty, surplus military vehicles – a FV434 armoured recovery vehicle, a FV180 Combat Engineer Tractor (CET), and an Armtrac 400 mine-clearing vehicle. Elsewhere, the boys get nostalgic for 1970s action/adventure series and attempt to create an opening sequence for a new one, involving a new and updated version of the classic Jensen Interceptor, while Clarkson tests out Lotus' new purpose-built Formula 1-inspired track car, the T125, and rock star and charity ambassador, Bob Geldof, is in the reasonably priced car. Note: Due to the MotoGP 2011 live coverage, the original transmission ended with no closing credits. The susbsequent iPlayer version of this episode cuts to a plain black background which the traditional theme music/end credits are then played over.
139	6	Lamborghini Aventador	Electric cars for the seaside: (Nissan Leaf • Peugeot iOn) • Extraordinary rally team of amputee military veterans	Louis Walsh • Race2Recovery Team • Ben Collins	31 July 2011	6.76 (Note: 5.68 million on BBC Two, 1.08 million on BBC HD.)
Clarkson and May go on a trip to the seaside, and take with them two new electrically powered cars, the Nissan Leaf and Peugeot iOn, to see how practical they are, while the long-awaited successor of the Murcielago – the Lamborghini Aventador – has arrived on the track to be given a thorough test by Hammond, and Louis Walsh sees how fast he is in the reasonably priced car. Finally, Hammond heads out to a cross-country rally event, to meet with the Race2Recovery Team – an extraordinary rally team, consisting entirely of ex-military amputees, who are taking part for the first time. In his interviews with some of the members, he learns how they are coping with their disabilities, using racing as a cure to their mental traumas, before giving them some help in their preparation for tackling the gruelling Dakar Rally, in the form of former Stig, Ben Collins.

== Criticism ==
The seventeenth series faced criticism following the broadcast of its final episode, over two elements in their Electric Cars review film. The first complaint focused on criticism of the presenters Jeremy Clarkson and James May for parking their cars into two disabled parking spaces. Executive producer Andy Wilman defended the presenters in an online blog on this matter, revealing that both had expressed deep concerns it would create a disrespectful impression, but only used the spaces when the car park's owner gave permission, adding that there had been three other disabled parking spaces available, before apologising to any viewers that had been upset by the scene.

The second complaint was made by several parties, including Nissan, electric car enthusiasts and newspapers when it transpired that a Nissan Leaf that had run out of charge, and required pushing in a scene in the film, had been run down to around 40% of its capacity before the car's test drive, leading to criticism on the programme's view on electric cars. Wilman rejected claims that the show was misleading viewers about the Leaf's charge and range, and stood by the consumer points that were raised in the film.

== Notes ==
The viewing figures shown in the Episode Table above, are a combination of the figures from the BBC Two broadcast and the BBC HD broadcast.
