= Cosworth GPV8 =

Overview
- Manufacturer: (United Kingdom) Cosworth
- Production: 2010–present

Layout
- Configuration: V8, naturally-aspirated, 90° cylinder angle
- Displacement: 3.5–3.8 L (214–232 cu in)
- Cylinder bore: Undisclosed
- Cylinder block material: Aluminum alloy
- Cylinder head material: Aluminum alloy
- Valvetrain: 32-valve, DOHC, four-valves per cylinder

Combustion
- Turbocharger: No
- Fuel system: Direct fuel injection
- Management: Pectel SQ6 ECU
- Fuel type: 98-octane unleaded Gasoline
- Oil system: Dry sump

Output
- Power output: 640–675 hp (477–503 kW)
- Torque output: 332–361 lb⋅ft (450–489 N⋅m)

Dimensions
- Dry weight: 297 lb (135 kg)

The GPV8 is a 3.5-litre and 3.8-litre, naturally-aspirated V8 engine, originally designed, developed and produced by Cosworth, for the Lotus T125 open-wheel sports car. The initial 3.5-litre V8 produced 640 hp (477 kW; 649 PS) at 9800 rpm, and 332 lb⋅ft (450 N⋅m) at 7600 rpm. The rev limit of the engine is 10,300 rpm; and can be temporarily raised to 10,800 rpm with a push-to-pass button feature. The enlarged 3.8-litre V8 is more powerful, producing 675 hp (503 kW; 684 PS) at 9600 rpm, and 361 lb⋅ft (489 N⋅m) at 7600 rpm, with a redline of 10,000 rpm. The engine's power density is between 136.3 kW (185.3 PS; 182.8 hp) and 132.4 kW (180.0 PS; 177.6 hp) per litre.

Unlike formula cars, the engine has been manufactured for durability, longevity, and reliability, with the engine able to withstand more than 5,000 km (3,107 mi) on premium 98-octane pump gas.

== Applications ==
- Lotus T125
