= Rolls-Royce Silver Shadow =

Car model

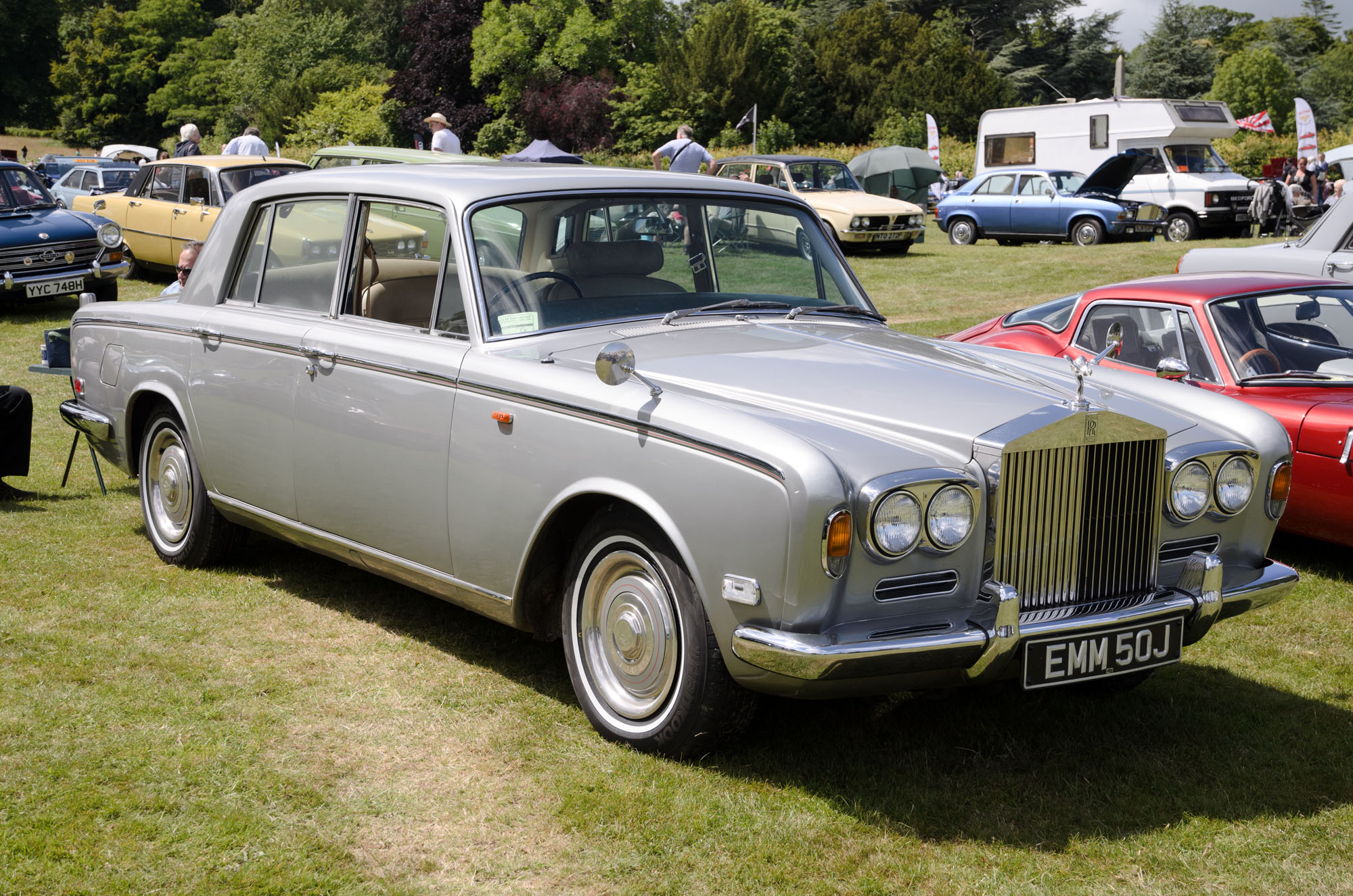
- 1971 Rolls-Royce Silver Shadow

Overview
- Manufacturer: Rolls-Royce Ltd (1965–1973); Rolls-Royce Motors (1973–1980)
- Also called: Rolls-Royce Silver Wraith II
- Production: 1965–1980; 30,057 produced
- Assembly: United Kingdom: Crewe, England

Body and chassis
- Class: Full-size luxury car (F)
- Body style: 2-door saloon; 2-door convertible; 4-door saloon
- Layout: Front-engine, rear-wheel-drive
- Related: Bentley T-series; Rolls-Royce Camargue; Rolls-Royce Corniche

Powertrain
- Engine: 6230 cc L410 V8 (1965–1970); 6750 cc L410 V8 (1970–1980)
- Transmission: 4-speed automatic (1965–70; RHD only); 3-speed THM 400 automatic

Dimensions
- Wheelbase: 119.5 in (3,035 mm); 123.5 in (3,137 mm) (LWB)
- Length: 203.5 in (5,169 mm); 207.5 in (5,270 mm) (LWB)
- Width: 71 in (1,803 mm)
- Height: 59.75 in (1,518 mm)
- Kerb weight: 4,648 lb (2,108 kg)

Chronology
- Predecessor: Rolls-Royce Silver Cloud III
- Successor: Rolls-Royce Silver Spirit

The Rolls-Royce Silver Shadow and its slightly stretched version, the Rolls-Royce Silver Wraith II, are full-size luxury cars produced by British automaker Rolls-Royce in various forms from 1965 to 1980. It was the first of the marque to use fully slabsided unitary body and chassis construction, as well as all-around independent suspension. Two-door versions were initially, between 1965 and 1971, sold as the Rolls-Royce Silver Shadow 2-door saloon and the Silver Shadow Drophead Coupé, before they became the Rolls-Royce Corniche Coupé and Convertible, respectively.

The Silver Shadow was produced from 1965 to 1976, and the Silver Shadow II from 1977 to 1980. The combined model run was 30,057 cars manufactured; James May reported it in 2014 as the largest production volume of any Rolls-Royce model.

A Bentley-badged version, the T-series, was produced from 1965 through 1980 in 2,336 examples.

== Models ==
=== Silver Shadow ===
The idea of mass-producing a smaller unibody Rolls-Royce model had been thought since the early-to-mid 1960s. During this time, Rolls-Royce entered into a collaborative venture with BMC, with a view to jointly producing a range of saloons and coupés. Rolls-Royce was thinking in terms of downsizing at this time, a reaction to the general down-turn in demand for their traditional coachbuilt models during the post-war years. As such, Rolls Royce and Bentley started designing a series of smaller unibody downsized luxury saloons with their intention of replacing the Rolls-Royce Silver Cloud and Bentley S1. The car would be the Rolls-Royce/Bentley Java and was derived from the unibody Princess 3-litre and used a 3909cc FB60 six-cylinder engine, derived from the Rolls-Royce B range engines and originally developed for the Bentley Burma saloon, which was built at the same time in 1961-1962. Essentially, the central bodyshell remained the same as the Princess but received Rolls Royce and Bentley style front and rear ends. Later, the whole body was completely revised and now resembled a smaller Bentley T-Series. In 1964, the Bentley Bengal/R-R Rangoon was also developed, essentially a similar vehicle based on the Austin 3-Litre. None entered production and all work was scrapped in 1964. It was the Bentley Burma from which the Silver Shadow/T-Series were closely derived from. The Bentley Burma originally derived from the Bentley Tibet concept car, a standard-sized full-size Bentley car, albeit still unibody developed since 1960. When it was decided to downsize the Rolls-Royce range, the Bentley Tibet bodyshell was shortened and put on a modified Bentley Java chassis and engine and was named the Bentley Burma. The 3909cc FB60 engine was however later abandoned for the 6230cc V8 that was currently in development. A Rolls-Royce version named the Tonga was also developed. Eventually, these projects were all cancelled and development was streamlined into one all-encompassing programme known as the SY. This car would eventually emerge as the Rolls-Royce Silver Shadow and Bentley T-Series. Later, a similar idea was used for the 1994 Bentley Java concept car.

The Silver Shadow was originally intended to be called Rolls-Royce Silver Mist, but was replaced with Silver Shadow at the last minute due to Mist meaning "manure" or "crap" in German. It was designed with several modernisations in response to concerns that the company was falling behind in automotive innovation, most notably in its unitary construction. With no experience in this area, Rolls-Royce contracted the body engineering work to Pressed Steel Fisher (PSF) and the body-in-white was manufactured at PSF's plant at the BMC/Morris factory at Cowley (now Plant Oxford - assembly site of the modern MINI), before being transported to Crewe for final assembly.

Style-wise, the John Polwhele Blatchley design was a major departure from its predecessor, the Silver Cloud. More than 50% of Silver Clouds had been sold on the domestic market where, by the standards of much of Europe and most of North America, roads were narrow and crowded. The new Shadow was 3 1/2 inches (8.9 cm) narrower and 7 inches (18 cm) shorter than the Silver Cloud, but nevertheless managed to offer increased passenger and luggage space, thanks to more efficient space utilisation made possible by unitary construction and a full-width, slab-sided body design.

Other new features included disc brakes replacing drums, and independent rear suspension instead of the outdated live rear axle design of previous Rolls-Royce models.

The standard wheelbase Silver Shadow measured 203.5 inches (5,170 mm), 4,700 lb (2,100 kg) and had a book price of £6,557 in the first year of production.

The Shadow featured a 172 hp (128 kW) 6.2 L V8 from 1965 to 1969, and a 189 hp (141 kW) 6.75 L V8 from 1970 to 1980. No official power outputs were stated, but registration authorities in many markets required outputs be listed. Left-hand-drive models were coupled to the recently introduced Turbo-Hydramatic 400 automatic gearbox sourced from General Motors (GM). Pre-1970, right-hand-drive (RHD) models used a highly modified, aluminum-cased version of the original cast-iron 4-speed Hydra-Matic gearbox that had been built in Crewe under licence from GM since 1953. From 1968, export RHD cars gained the Turbo-Hydramatic 400, and by 1970, the 4-speed unit had been completely phased out even in the home market.

A distinctive feature was a high-pressure hydropneumatic suspension system licensed from Citroën, with dual-circuit braking and hydraulic self-levelling suspension. At first, both the front and rear of the car were controlled by the levelling system; the front levelling was deleted in 1969 as it had been determined that the rear levelling did almost all the work. Rolls-Royce achieved a high degree of ride quality with this arrangement.

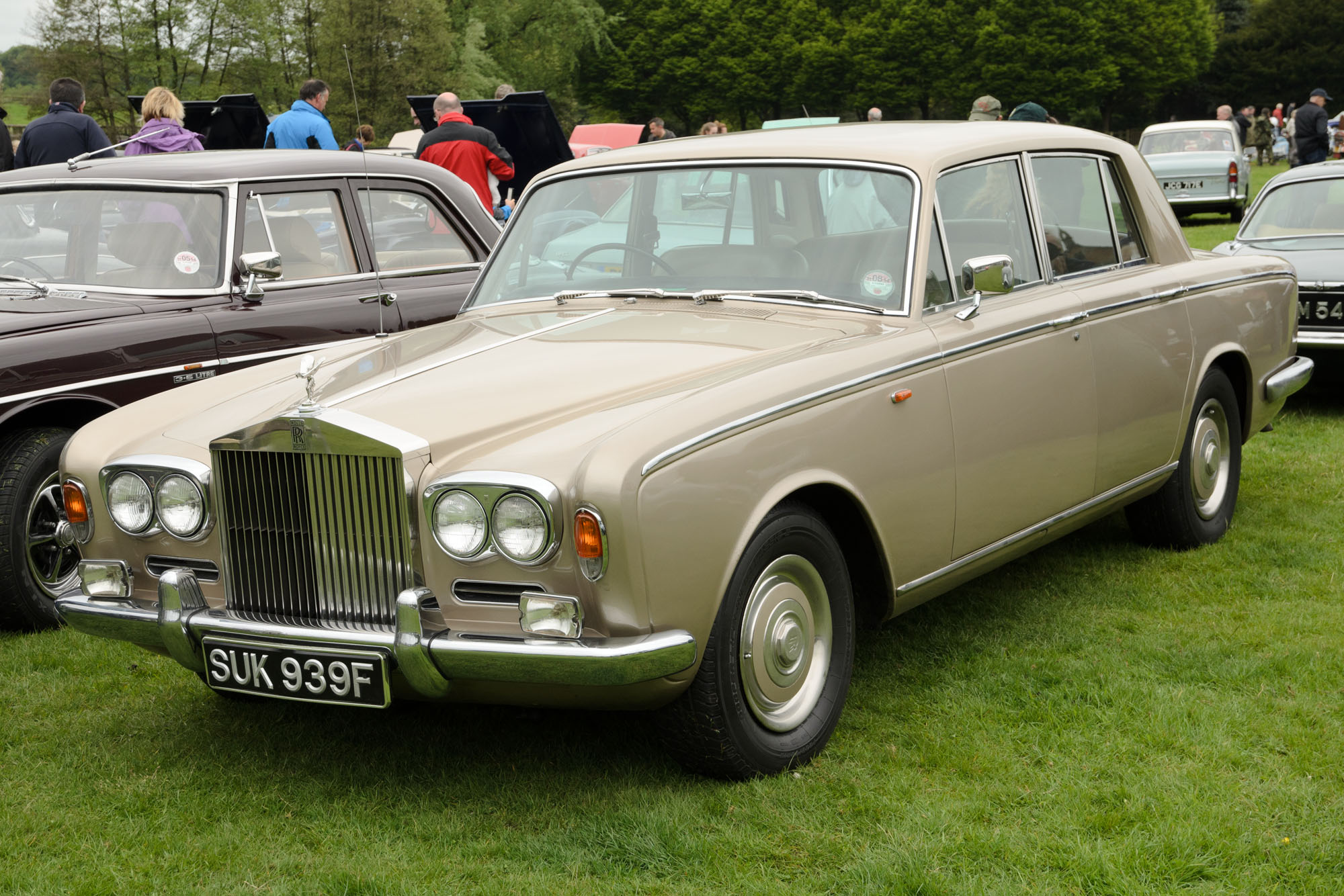
1968 Rolls-Royce Silver Shadow

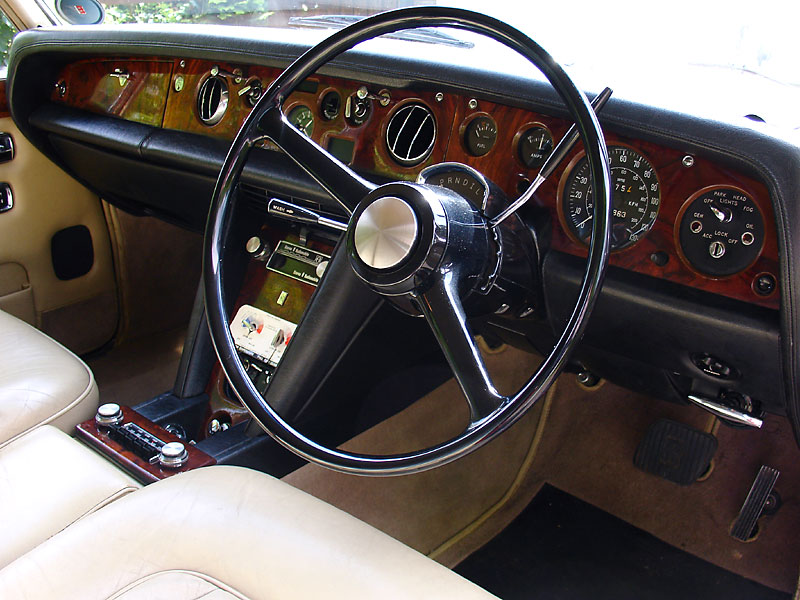
1972 Silver Shadow interior

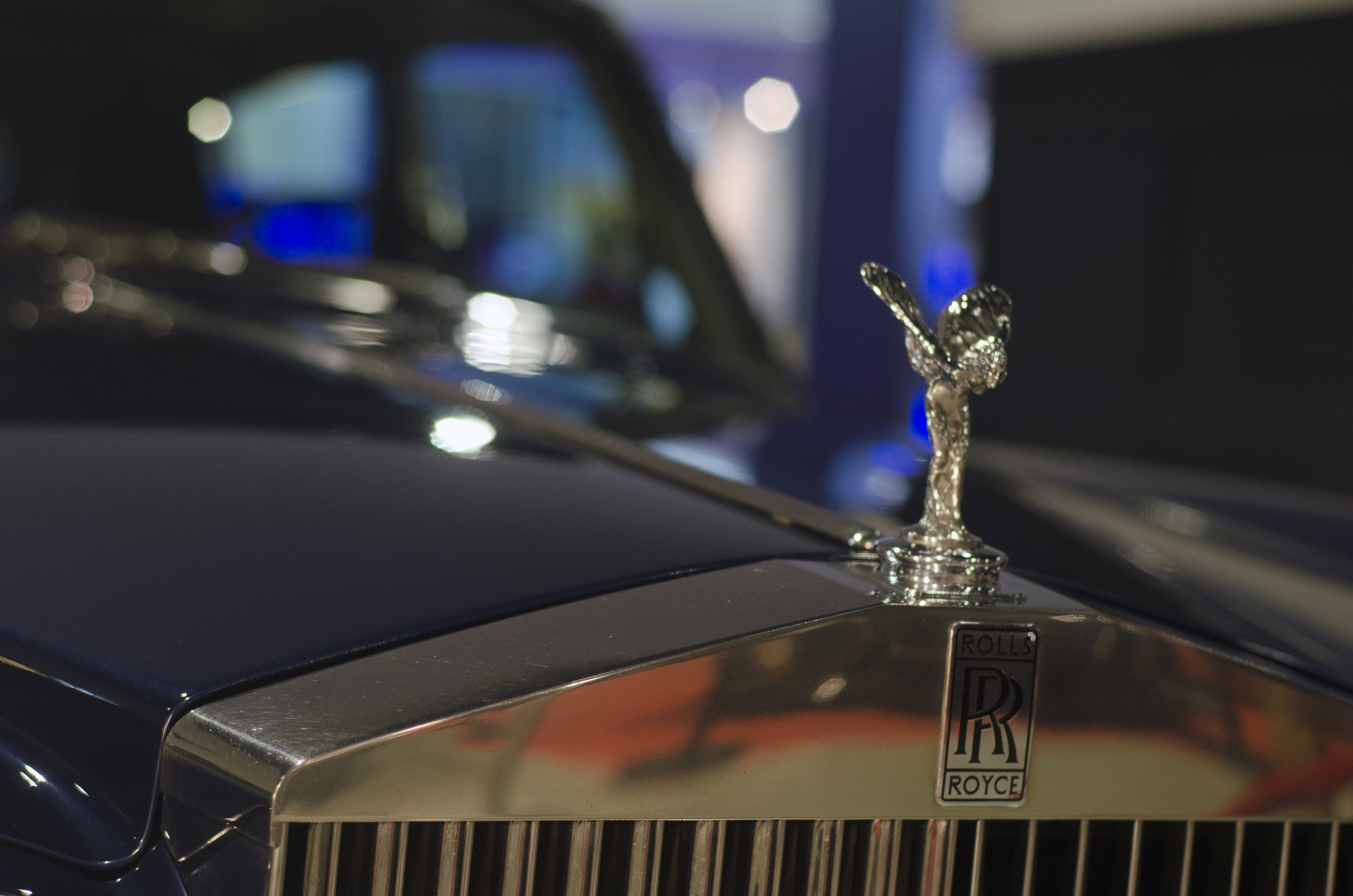
Front grille (top) of a 1972 Silver Shadow, showing Rolls-Royce's trademark bonnet mascot, and the double R logo below it

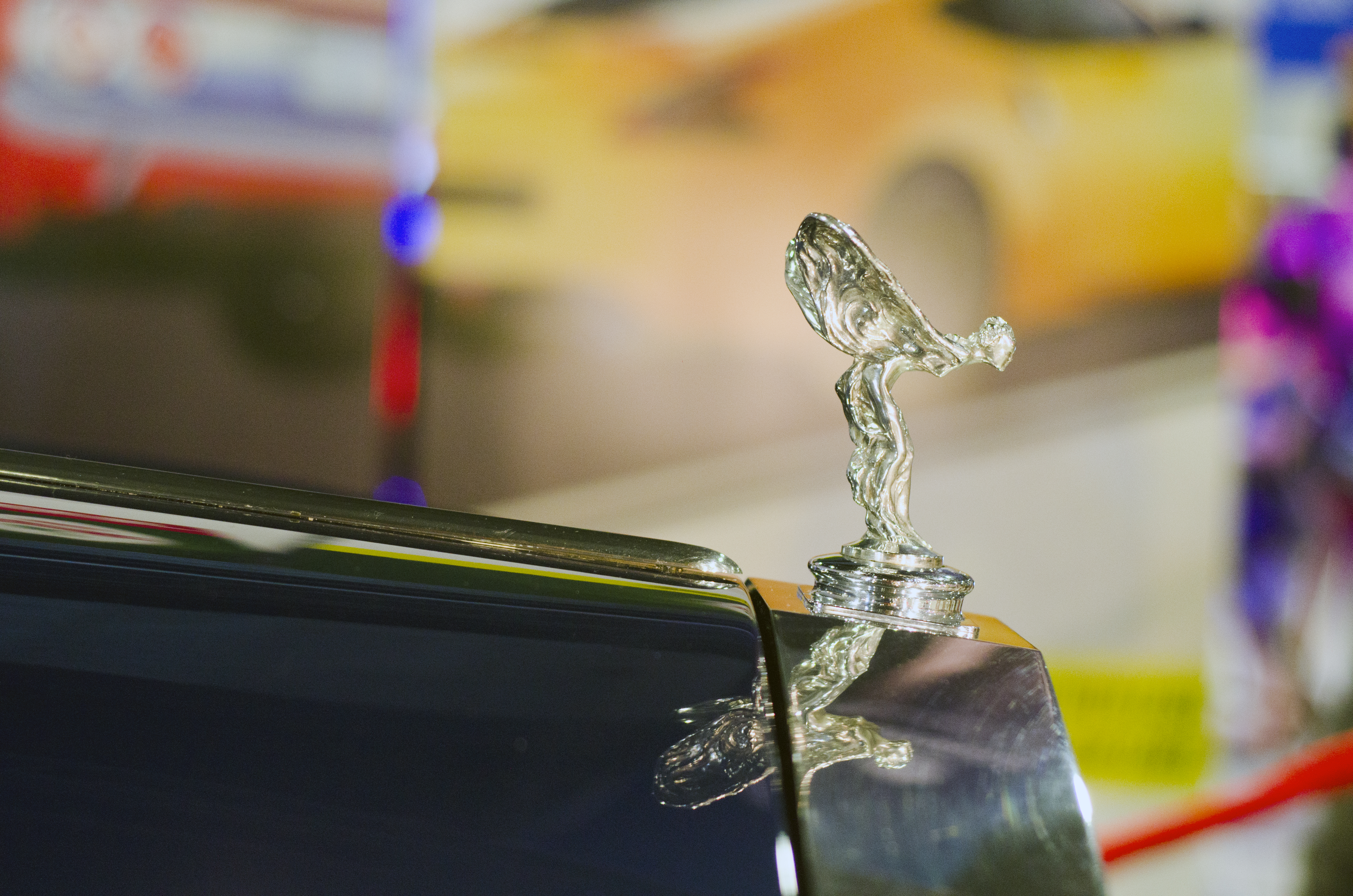
Side profile close-up of the "Spirit of Ecstasy" / "Flying Lady" mascot of a 1972 Silver Shadow

=== Two-door versions ===
A two-door saloon was introduced early in 1966, followed by a convertible in 1967. There are two different versions of the two-door saloon – the more common Mulliner Park Ward, featuring a raked C-pillar and swooping rear bumper line, and the very rare early James Young model reflecting the more formal 4-door that was only built in thirty-five Rolls-Royce examples (with another fifteen Bentleys), discontinued in 1967.

The convertible variant, by Mulliner Park Ward and similar in style to its 2-door saloon, was marketed as the Silver Shadow Drophead Coupé.

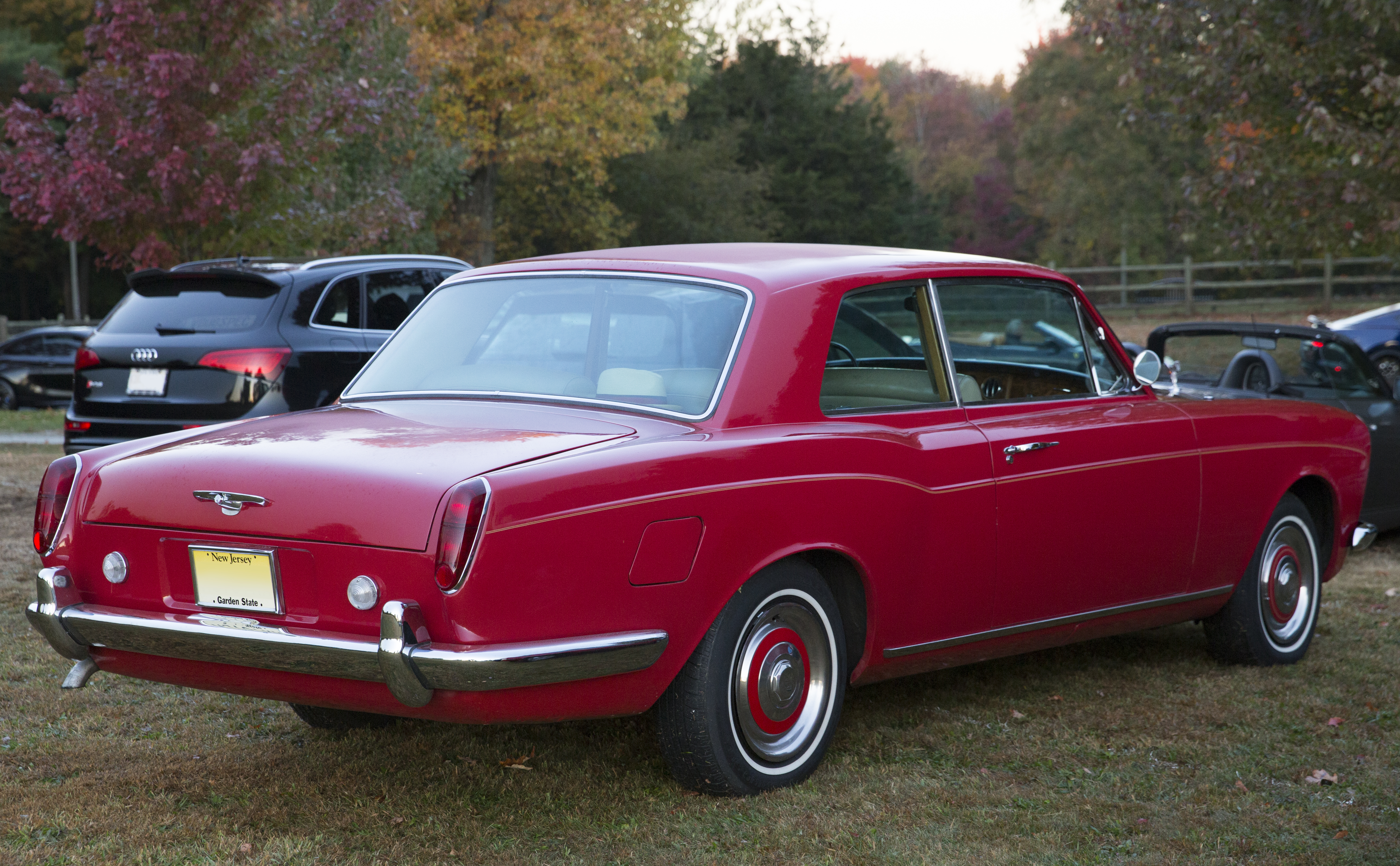
1967 Silver Shadow two-door saloon by Mulliner Park Ward

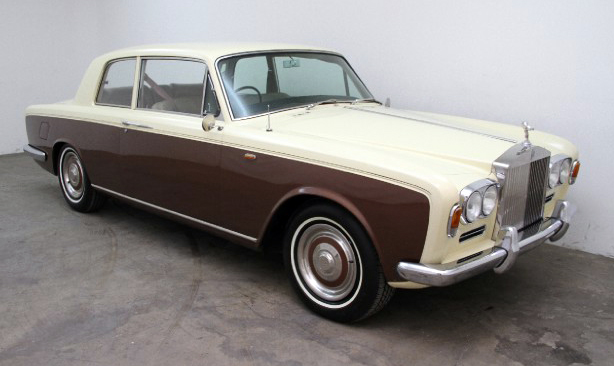
1967 Silver Shadow two-door saloon by James Young

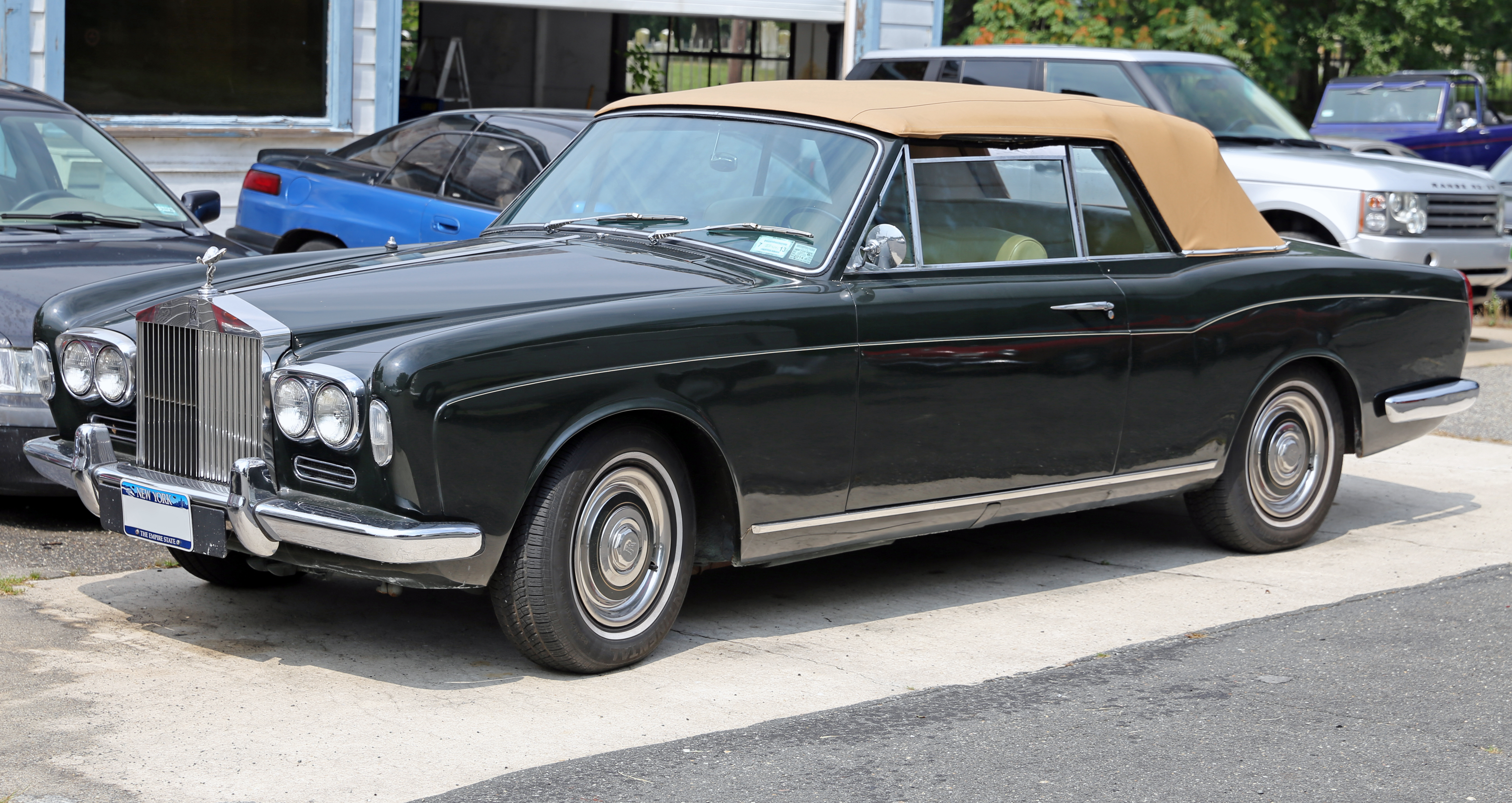
1967 Silver Shadow Drophead Coupé by Mulliner Park Ward

=== Silver Shadow II ===
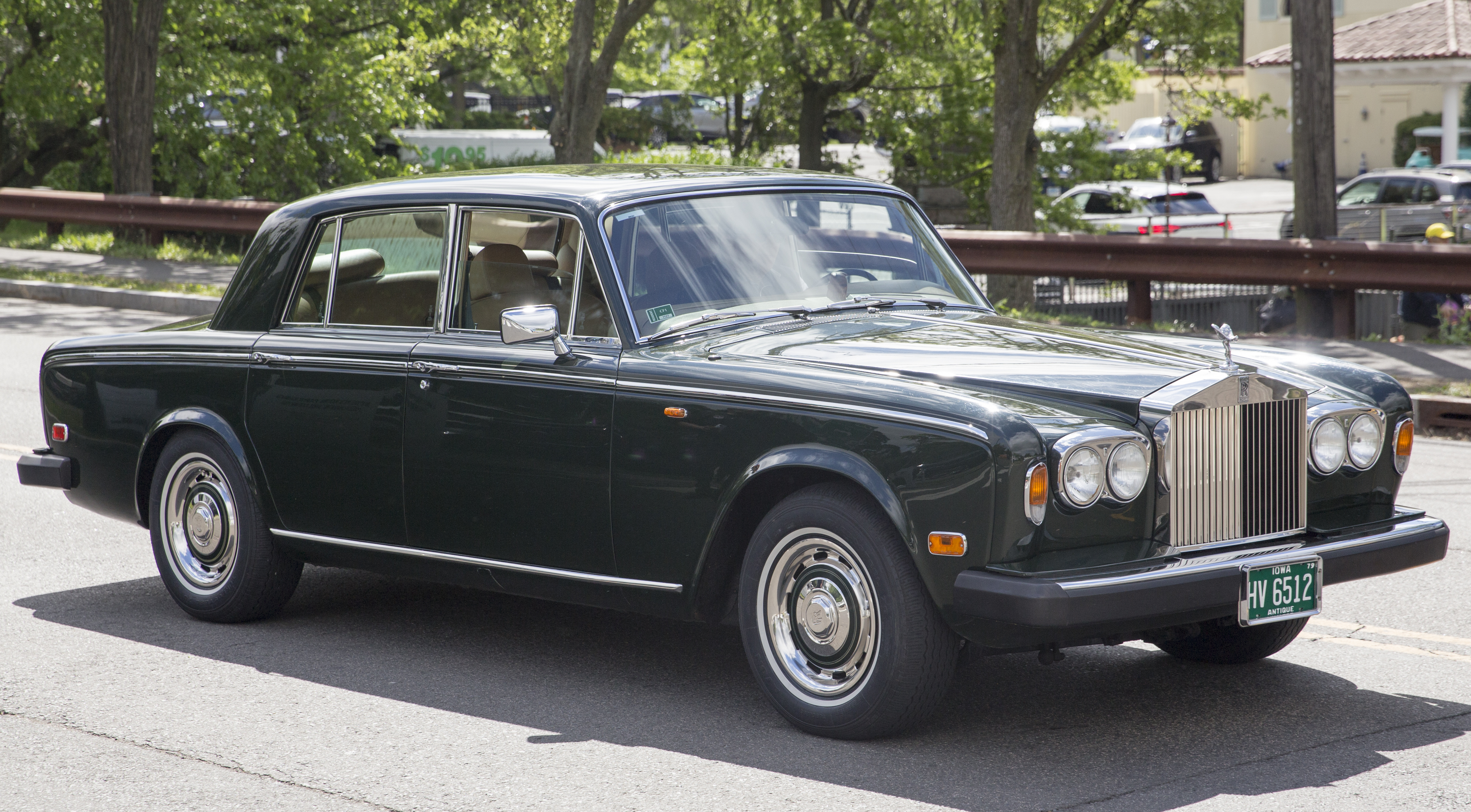
1979 Silver Shadow II

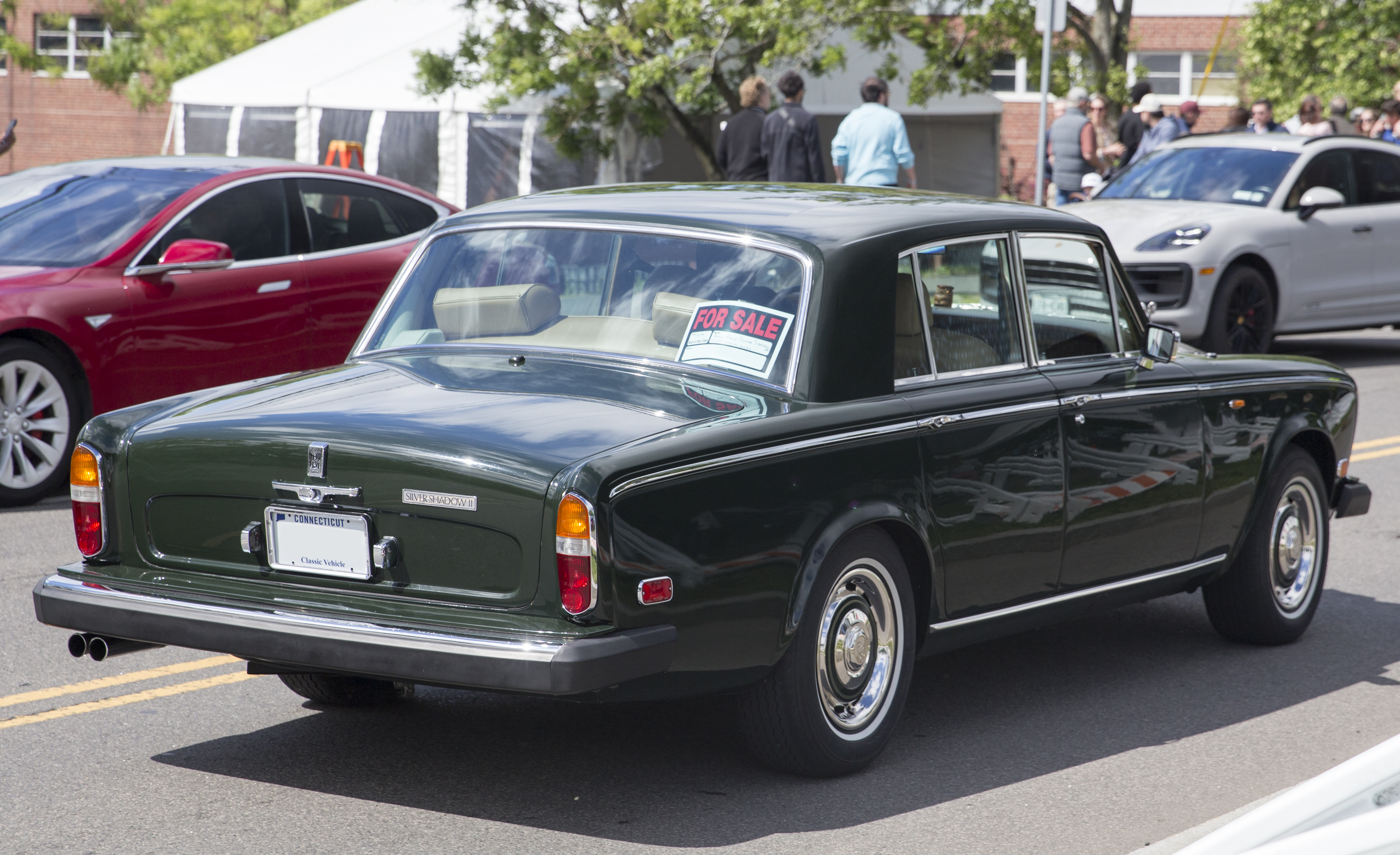
1979 Silver Shadow II (rear view)

In 1977, the model was renamed the Silver Shadow II in recognition of several major changes, most notably rack and pinion steering; modifications to the front suspension improved handling markedly.

Externally, the bumpers were changed from chrome to alloy and rubber starting with the late 1976 Silver Shadows. These new energy-absorbing bumpers had been used in the United States since 1974, as a response to tightening safety standards there. Nonetheless, the bumpers on cars sold outside of North America were still solidly mounted and protruded 2 in (5 cm) less. Also now made standard across the board was the deletion of the small grilles mounted beneath the headlamps.

In 1979, to commemorate the 75th anniversary of the company, 212 Silver Shadow IIs (and one Camargue) were specially fitted with the original red "RR" badges front and rear and a silver commemorative placard on the inside of the glove box door. Originally, 75 examples were designated for each zone (United Kingdom, United States, and Rest of the World) but the full number was not built. The 75 examples designated for the North American market were only available in Georgian Silver with a grey leather interior with red piping and scarlet red carpets. These were built according to plans, along with ten additional examples to the same specifications for Canada.

== Derivatives ==
=== Silver Wraith II ===
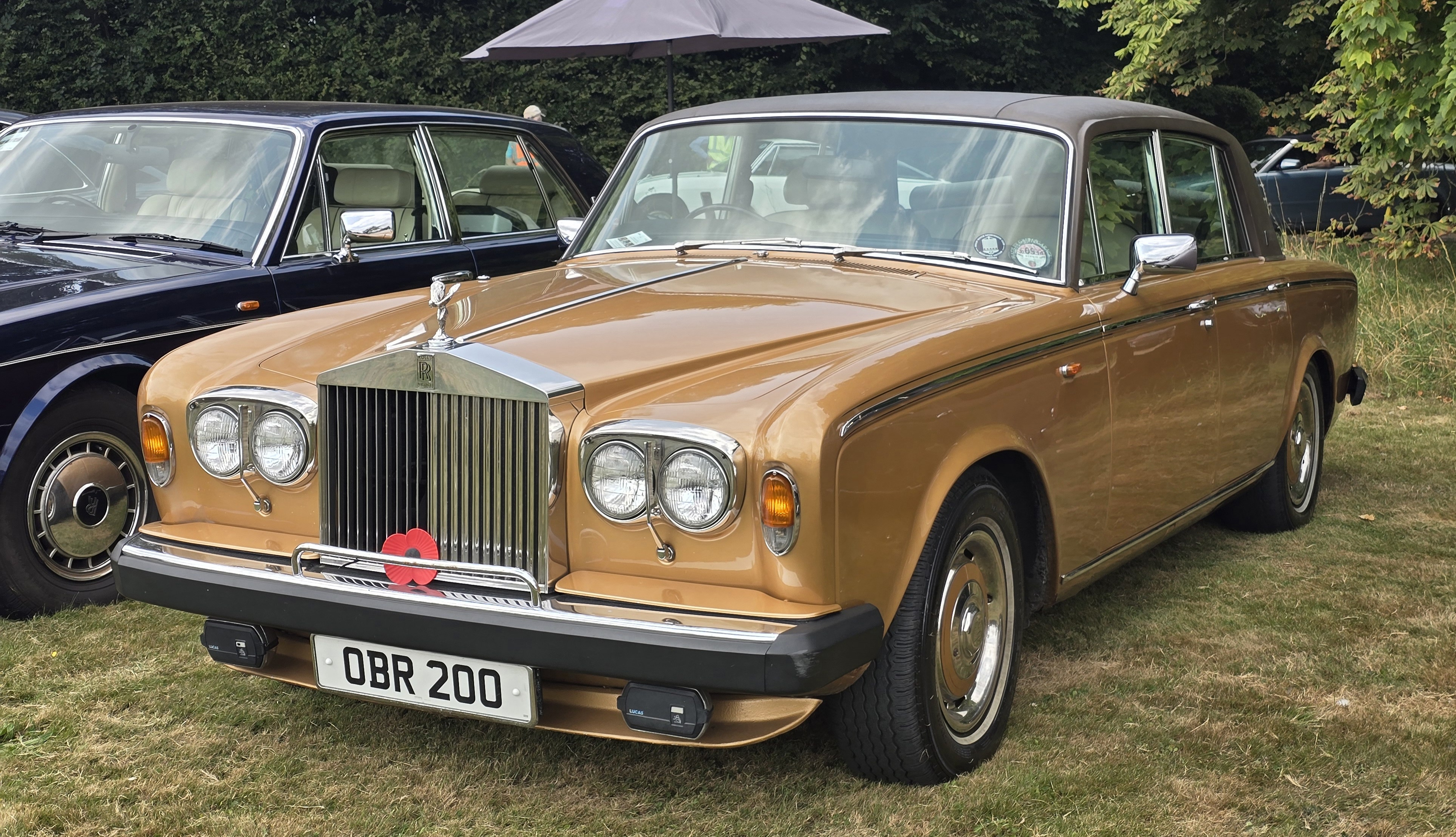
Rolls-Royce Silver Wraith II (UK)

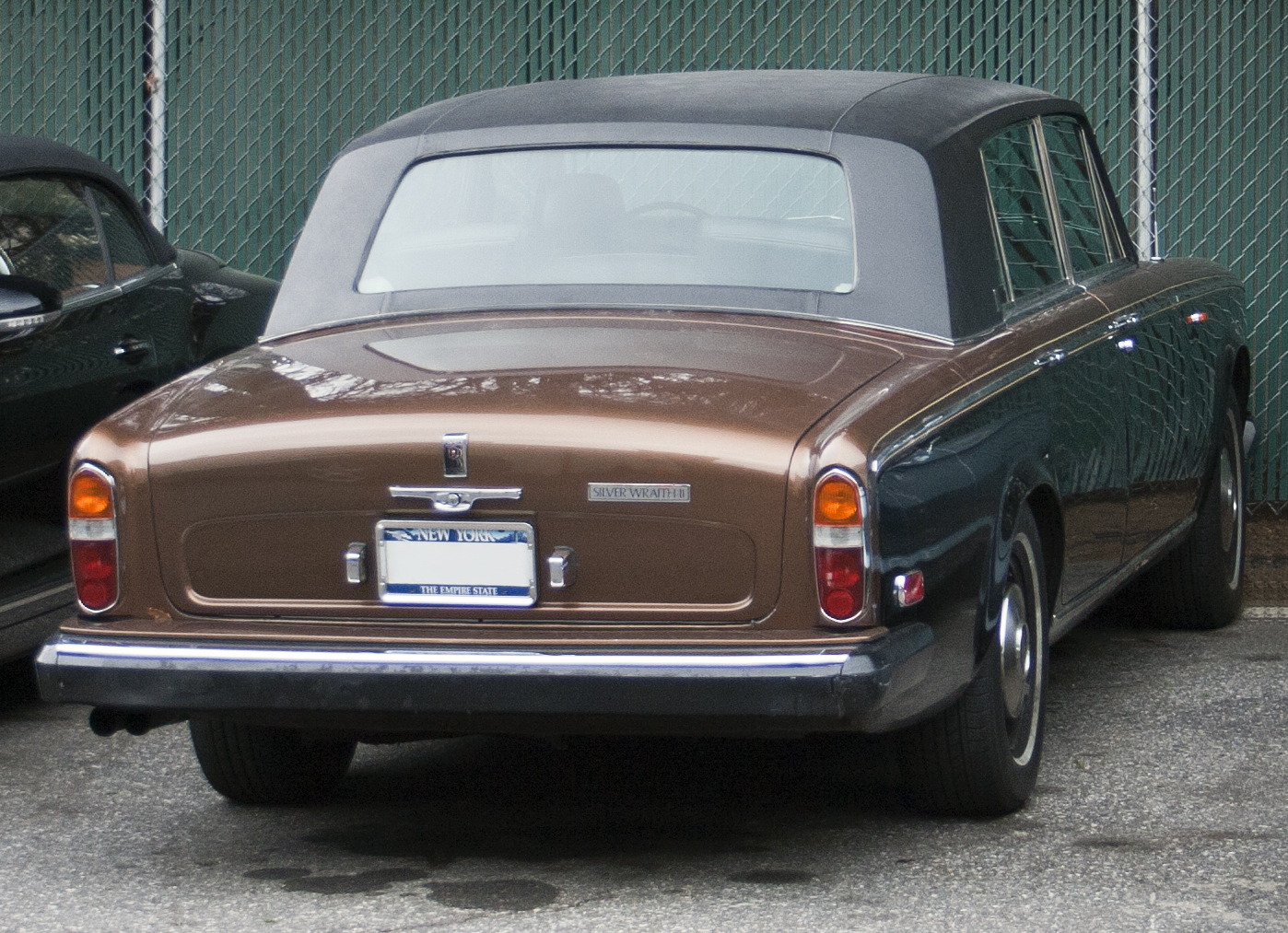
The smaller, more formal rear window of the Silver Wraith II (North America)

Rolls-Royce considered offering a more exclusive, long-wheelbase Phantom VII model based on the Silver Shadow, but production was not pursued and no prototypes were built. Instead, a pilot series of ten stretched-wheelbase "limousines" – which offered an additional 4 inches of rear seat legroom – was built in 1967 and sold, one of them to Princess Margaret.

This long-wheelbase variant was offered in the United States from May 1969, and available to domestic customers from early 1970.

Some extended-wheelbase models were fitted with an electrically retractable privacy glass divider. Outside of North America, the cars with a divider were fitted with a separate air conditioning unit mounted in the boot – North American safety laws made this impossible, as the petrol tank would have had to be relocated. The cars with a divider lost the entire gain in wheelbase, trading off extra legroom for privacy.

Initially, the long-wheelbase model did not have a separate name, but with the introduction of the Silver Shadow II in 1976 the longer car was dubbed the Silver Wraith II.

The Silver Wraith II is identified by all alterations found on the Silver Shadow II and additionally an Everflex-covered roof (also available as an option on the Silver Shadow II), a smaller, more formal rear window, and different wheel covers.

The Rolls-Royce factory built a special stretch limousine on Silver Wraith basis in 1979. It was ordered by the religious leader Bhagwan Shree Rajneesh, who had a collection of 93 Rolls-Royces.

=== Corniche ===
In 1971 the Silver Shadow two-door models were given the separate identity of Corniche (with either Rolls-Royce or Bentley badging), and eventually went on to outlive the Silver Shadow by some years with production lasting until 1982 for the coupé and 1996 for the convertible.

=== Camargue ===
Another coupé variant on the Shadow platform was the Camargue, with bodywork designed by the Italian firm Pininfarina, and production running from 1975 to 1986. The Camargue had the distinction of being the most expensive production Rolls-Royce.

=== Bentley T ===
A Bentley version of the Shadow, known as the Bentley T (and Bentley T2 from 1977), was also made. It was mechanically identical and differed only in the badging and design of the radiator shell. The more rounded radiator also required a slightly reshaped bonnet profile. Other modifications were only slight cosmetic ones, a different front bumper and hubcaps. Engine valve covers with a "Bentley" logo were only used when the factory had them available.

The long-wheelbase version of the Bentley T did not have a separate identity and was simply called T long-wheelbase or T2 long-wheelbase. Only a very few of these were built (9 and 10 examples respectively, less than 0.4% of the total long-wheelbase production).

All two-door cars were also available as Bentleys. However, only one example of a Bentley Camargue was ever produced.

== Production statistics ==
Standard Steel Saloon Production
Model	In production	Units sold/numbers built
Silver Shadow	1965–1977	16,717
Silver Shadow II	1977–1980	8,425
Total		25,142

Long Wheel Base production
Model	In production	Units sold/numbers built
Silver Shadow LWB	1969–1977	2,780
Silver Wraith II	1975–1980	2,135
Total		4,915

== Commemoration ==
In 2013, the Rolls-Royce Silver Shadow featured on a "British Auto Legends" postage stamp issued by the Royal Mail.

== Popular culture ==
- The Rolls-Royce Silver Shadow, and its derivatives, have appeared in numerous film and television shows to define the rarefied upper echelons of wealth. The most filmed individual Rolls-Royce motor car, is chassis no. SRH 2971, a shell grey Silver Shadow (early ). First seen from 1968 in TV series The Avengers then until 1983.
- Rock band Queen frontman Freddie Mercury, who never drove a car because he had no licence, was often chauffeured around London in his Silver Shadow from 1979 until his death in 1991. The car was passed to his sister Kashmira who made it available for display at public events, including the West End premiere of the musical We Will Rock You in 2002, before it was auctioned off at the National Exhibition Centre.
- Steve McQueen often drove a 1967 Silver Shadow two-door sedan in his 1968 film, The Thomas Crown Affair.
- The Silver Shadow has been used in several James Bond films, including a drophead coupé in On Her Majesty's Secret Service (1969), a Silver Shadow I in The Man with the Golden Gun (1974), a Silver Shadow I LWB in For Your Eyes Only (1981), a Silver Shadow II (driven by Q) in Licence to Kill, and a Silver Shadow II in The World Is Not Enough (1999).
- Jamie Farr's Arabian sheikh raced in a 1974 Silver Shadow I in the 1981 action comedy The Cannonball Run.
- One of Princess Margaret's favourite cars was a 1980 Rolls-Royce Silver Wraith II which she owned for 22 years until her death, with notable passengers including Paul Getty, Ronald and Nancy Reagan, Lady Diana Spencer, the Queen and Queen Elizabeth The Queen Mother.
- In 1997, a white 1972 Rolls-Royce Silver Shadow was depicted on the cover of the Oasis album Be Here Now. During the photo shoot for the album, the car was lowered into the swimming pool of Stocks House, Hertfordshire.
- A Silver Wraith II (1979 model) made multiple appearances in the first season of Netflix's The Umbrella Academy. It was first very briefly revealed at the end of the series' first episode, "We Only See Each Other at Weddings and Funerals". The same vehicle later made a clearer appearance at the end of "Number Five". It also appeared in the beginning and end of "The Day That Was" and of "I Heard a Rumor". It was seen for the last time at the beginning of "Changes".
- Japanese director Juzo Itami was known as a Rolls-Royce aficionado, featuring several Rolls-Royce and Bentley vehicles in his movies including a Silver Shadow in his 1984 film The Funeral, a Bentley T-series in the popular 1985 classic Tampopo, and a Silver Shadow in the 1987 film A Taxing Woman. His last personal vehicle, a Bentley Continental, is maintained at his museum in Matsuyama.
- The Corniche immediately became a status symbol for celebrities upon its release in 1971. Paul McCartney, Frank Sinatra and Tom Jones all bought one. David Bowie, Michael Caine, Elton John and Dean Martin put their names on two-year-long waiting lists, and it has been seen in countless films and television shows from Beverly Hills, 90210 to Dynasty, and Dirty Rotten Scoundrels, Sixteen Candles, and The Player. No other car conveyed an image of the idle rich better than the Corniche.
