= Everflex =

British fabric used as a roof covering on cars

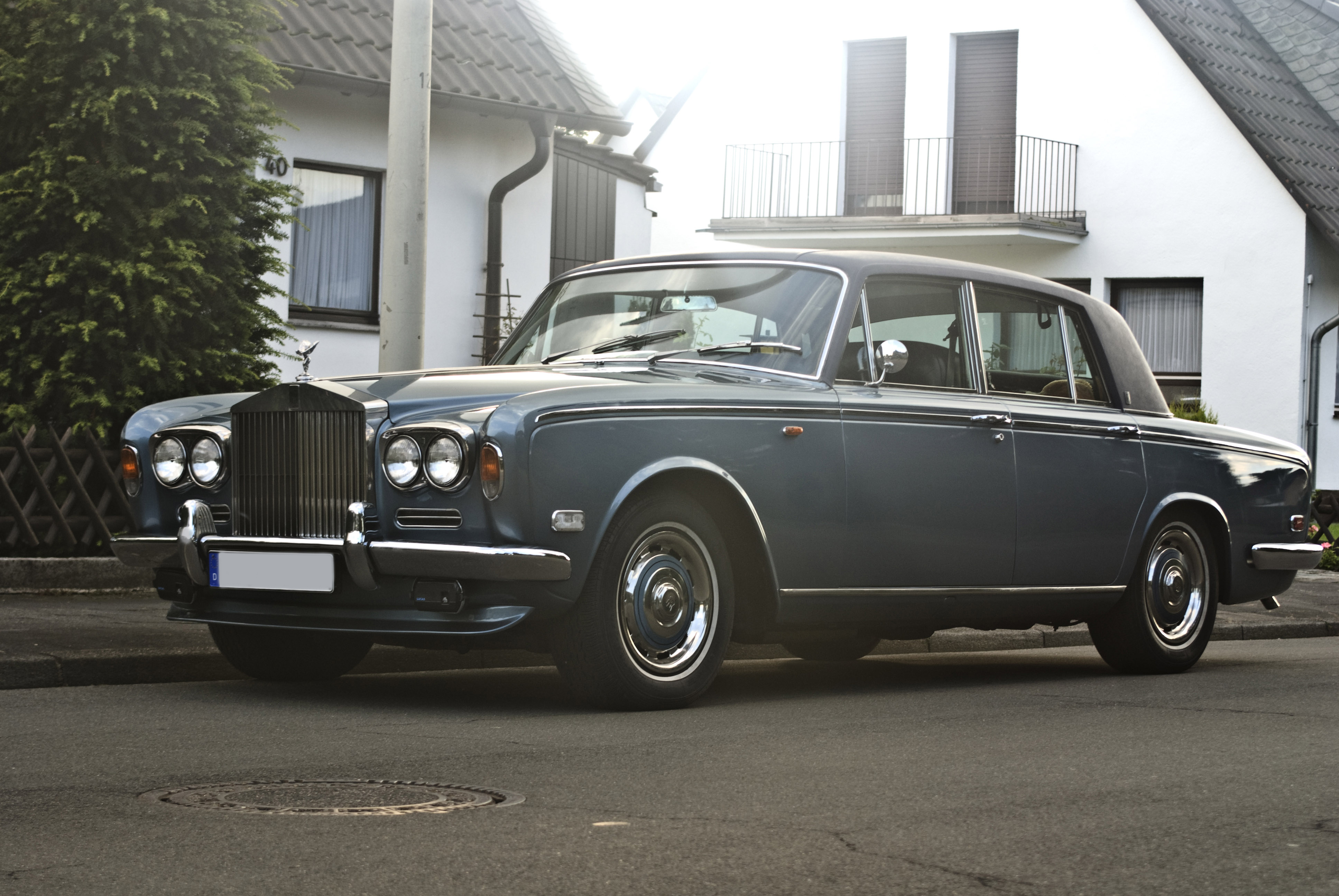
Rolls-Royce Silver Shadow I with dark blue Everflex

Everflex is a British fabric used as a roof covering on cars, and is a type of vinyl roof. Everflex was used on both hardtops and convertibles.

Its usage was popular from the 1960s to the 1980s on luxury cars. Though its popularity has greatly decreased for new vehicles, it is still manufactured as a material used to restore vehicles. The material is similar to the vinyl used on most vehicles, but is more durable and more expensive. On hardtop vehicles, fabric is placed below the Everflex material to add weight and body, often making the car look more like a genuine convertible. On older vehicles, a fabric called "Union Cloth" was used, but it quickly deteriorated, trapping water and damaging the Everflex material and roof. The Everflex is then glued down and can be screwed in around doors and windows. Notable car companies that use Everflex material are Rolls-Royce, Austin-Healey, Morgan Motor Company and Jaguar Cars. The feature was most popular on the Rolls-Royce Silver Shadow in the early 1970s. Apart from its usage in the automotive industry, companies such as B. F. Goodrich marketed Everflex as a stronger alternative to rubber.

An unrelated wetsuit material by the name of Everflex gained popularity in the early 2000s.
