= Dabbawala =

Lunchbox delivery and return system in India

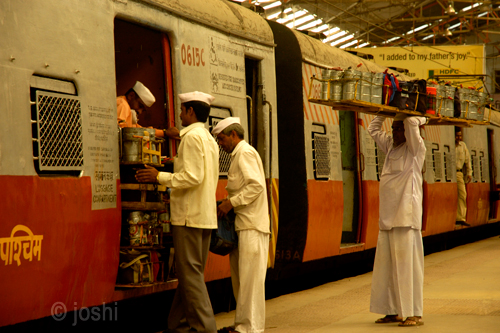
- Dabbawalas loading lunch boxes on a train

Occupation
- Synonyms: Tiffin wallah
- Occupation type: Manual labour
- Activity sectors: Delivery (commerce)

A dabbawala (also spelled dabbawalla or dabbawallah, called tiffin wallah in older sources) is a worker who delivers hot lunches from homes and restaurants to people at work in India and Pakistan, especially in Mumbai and Karachi. The dabbawalas constitute a lunchbox delivery and return system for workers in Mumbai and Karachi. The lunchboxes are picked up in the late morning, delivered predominantly using bicycles and railway trains, and returned empty in the afternoon.

== Origins ==
In the late 1800s, an increasing number of migrants were moving to Bombay from different parts of the country, and fast food and canteens were not prevalent. All these people left early in the morning for offices, and often had to go hungry for lunch. They belonged to different communities, and therefore had different preferences, which could only be satisfied by their own home-cooked meals. So, in 1890, Mahadeo Havaji Bachche started a lunch delivery service in Bombay with about a hundred men. This model proved to be successful and the service grew. In 1930, he informally attempted to unionize the dabbawalas. Later, a charitable trust was registered in 1956 under the name of Nutan Mumbai Tiffin Box Suppliers Trust. The commercial arm of this trust was registered in 1968 as Mumbai Tiffin Box Suppliers Association.

== Etymology ==
When literally translated, the word "dabbawala" means "one who carries a box". "Dabba" means a box (usually a cylindrical tin or aluminium container) from Persian: دَبّه, while "wala" is an agentive suffix, denoting a doer or holder of the preceding word. An English translation would be "tiffin box delivery person".

== Colour-coding system ==
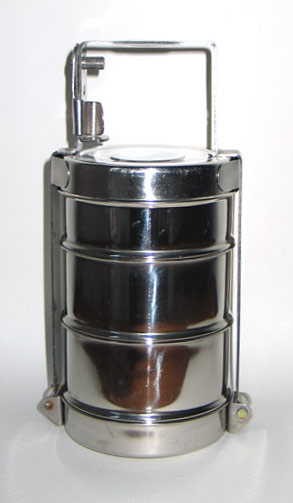
A dabba, or Indian-style tiffin box

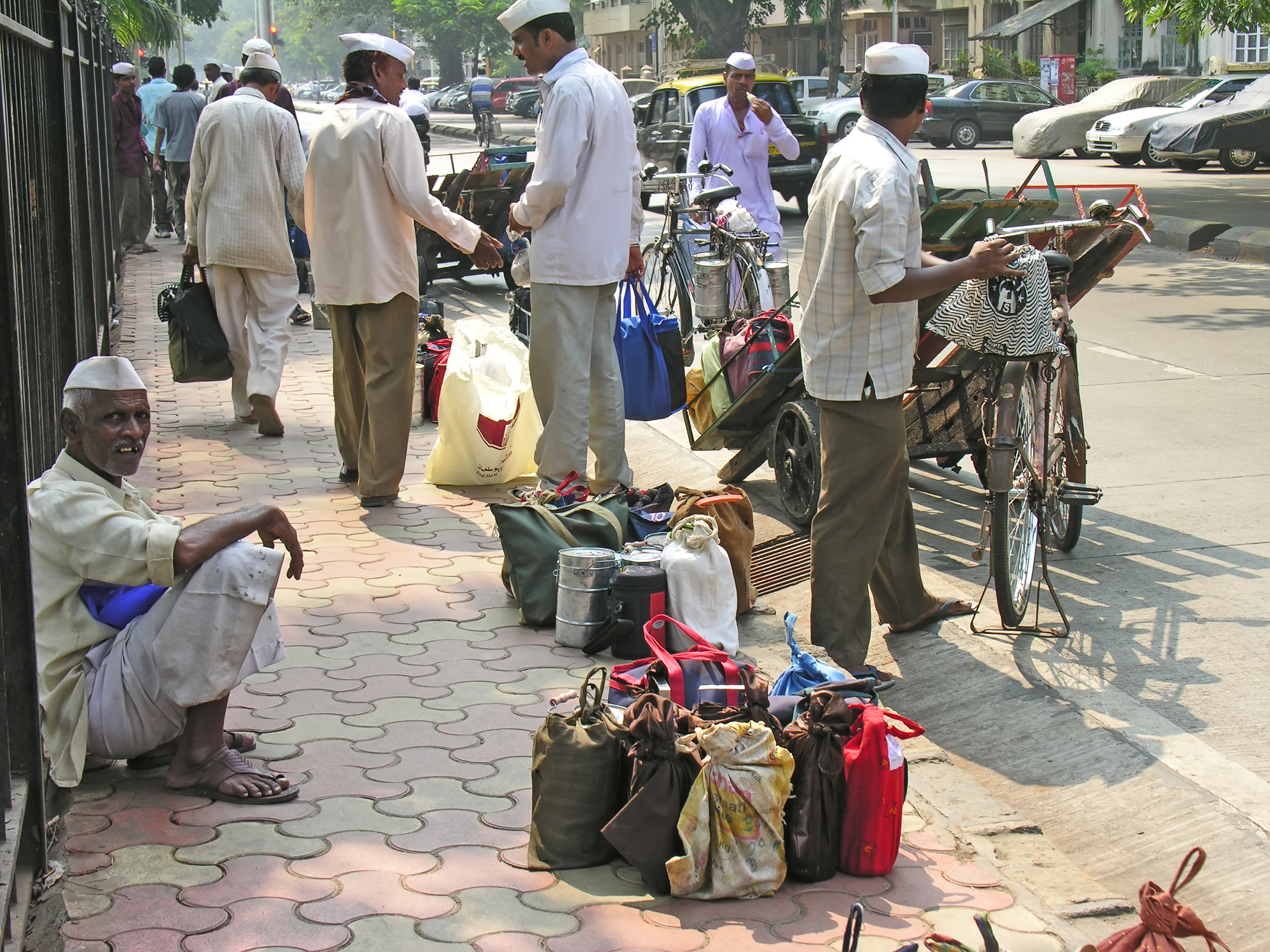
Dabbawalas with colored and numbered boxes

Lunch boxes are marked in several ways:

1. Abbreviations for collection points
2. Colour code for starting station
3. Number for destination station
4. Markings for handling dabbawala at destination, building and floor

A colour-coding system identifies the destination and recipient. Each dabbawala is required to contribute a minimum capital in kind, in the form of two bicycles, a wooden crate for the tiffins, white cotton kurta-pyjamas, and the white Gandhi cap (topi). Each month there is a division of the earnings of each unit. Fines are imposed for alcohol and tobacco use, being out of uniform, and absenteeism.

A collecting dabbawala, usually on bicycle, collects dabbas either from a worker's home or from the dabba makers. Because the average literacy of dabbawallahs is that of 8th grade, the dabbas (boxes) have some sort of distinguishing mark on them, such as a colour or group of symbols.

The dabbawala then takes them to a sorting place, where they and other collecting dabbawalas sort the lunch boxes into groups. The grouped boxes are put in the coaches of trains, with markings to identify the destination of the box (usually there is a designated car for the boxes). The markings include the railway station to unload the boxes and the destination building delivery address. Some modern infrastructure improvements such as the Navi Mumbai Metro are not used in the supply chain, as cabins do not have the capacity for hundreds of tiffins.

At each station, boxes are handed over to a local dabbawala, who delivers them. The empty boxes are collected after lunch or the next day and sent back to the respective houses. The dabbawalas also allow for delivery requests through SMS.

== Ethnicity ==
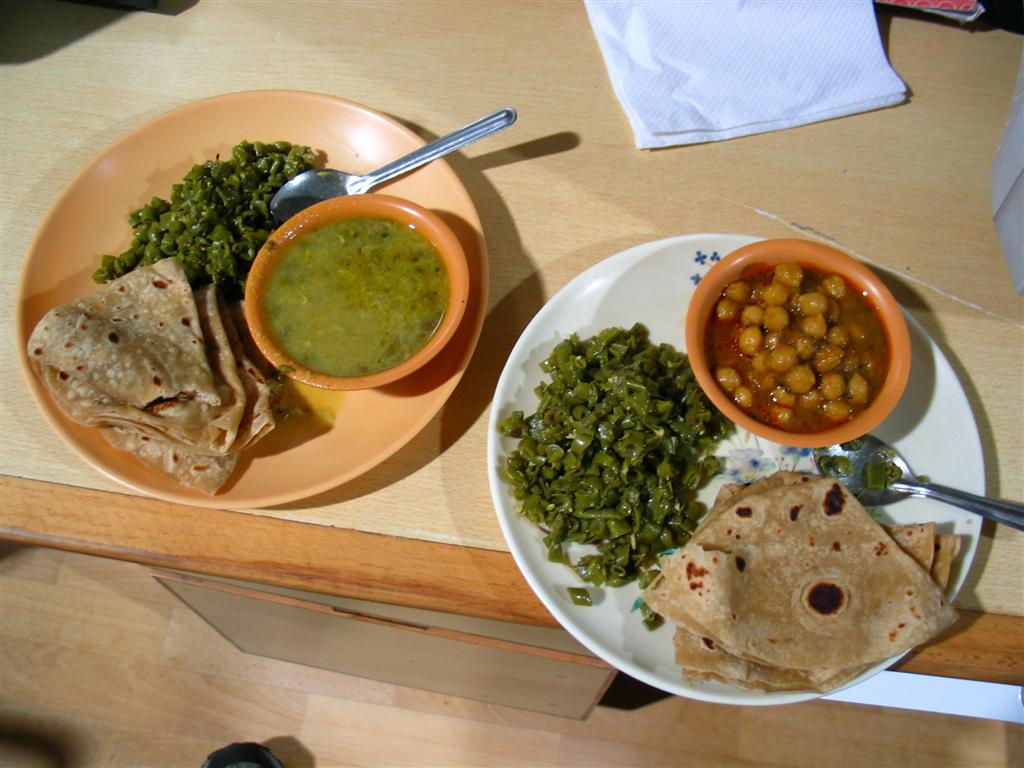
Two typical dabbawala lunches

Most dabbawalas are related to each other, belong to the Varkari sect of Maharashtra, and come from the same small village near Pune. Tiffin distribution is suspended for five days each March as the dabbawalas go home for the annual village festival.

Dabbawalas have traditionally been male, but in recent years a few women have joined the profession. A dabbawala can be either a foreman, mukadam, or a simple delivery man, gaddi. Typically, they begin between the ages of 15 and 20. While they take pride in their freedom and the fact that they work in a network of their relatives, the relatively low compensation provided for their physical exertion makes them discourage their own children from joining the profession.

In a typical day, a dabbawala picks up tiffins every morning and then sorts them once before they are loaded onto the morning train (at approximately 10 a.m.). The tiffins are sorted another time in the luggage compartment of the train. At the destination station, the tiffins are loaded into carts and deposited in stacks at the entrances of the various workplaces. Following lunch, the same procedure is carried out in the reverse order with the empty tiffins.

== Association ==
The earliest meetings of the Mumbai Tiffin Box Suppliers Association were held in the open air. They took up premises in 1943 and settled the headquarters at Dadar in 1962. Located on the first floor of a building, the premises consist of a large, simply furnished room.

The association was reportedly started after a dabbawalla was ill-treated by a customer, resulting in the dabbawallas deciding to form a "united front" while dealing with injustices or difficulties, such as funerals. The association also helps with managing legal issues, including conflicts between mukadams and gaddis. All conflicts are resolved in the presence of 20 mukadams, which are selected every six years.

The charitable Nutan Mumbai Tiffin Box Suppliers Trust consists of nine members who are elected every five years. Its main role is to collect funds for dharamshalas.

== Economic analysis ==
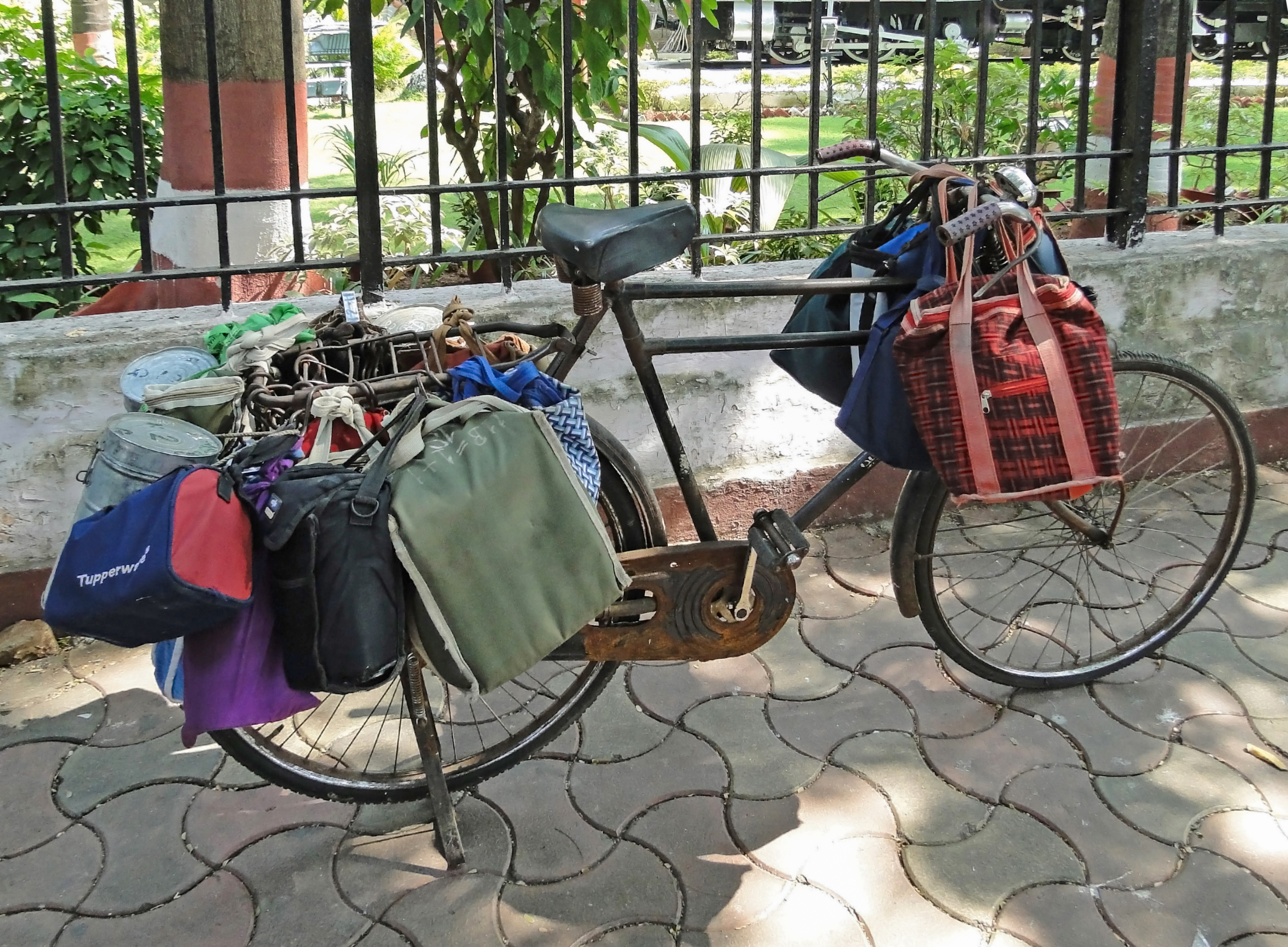
A typical dabbawala bicycle

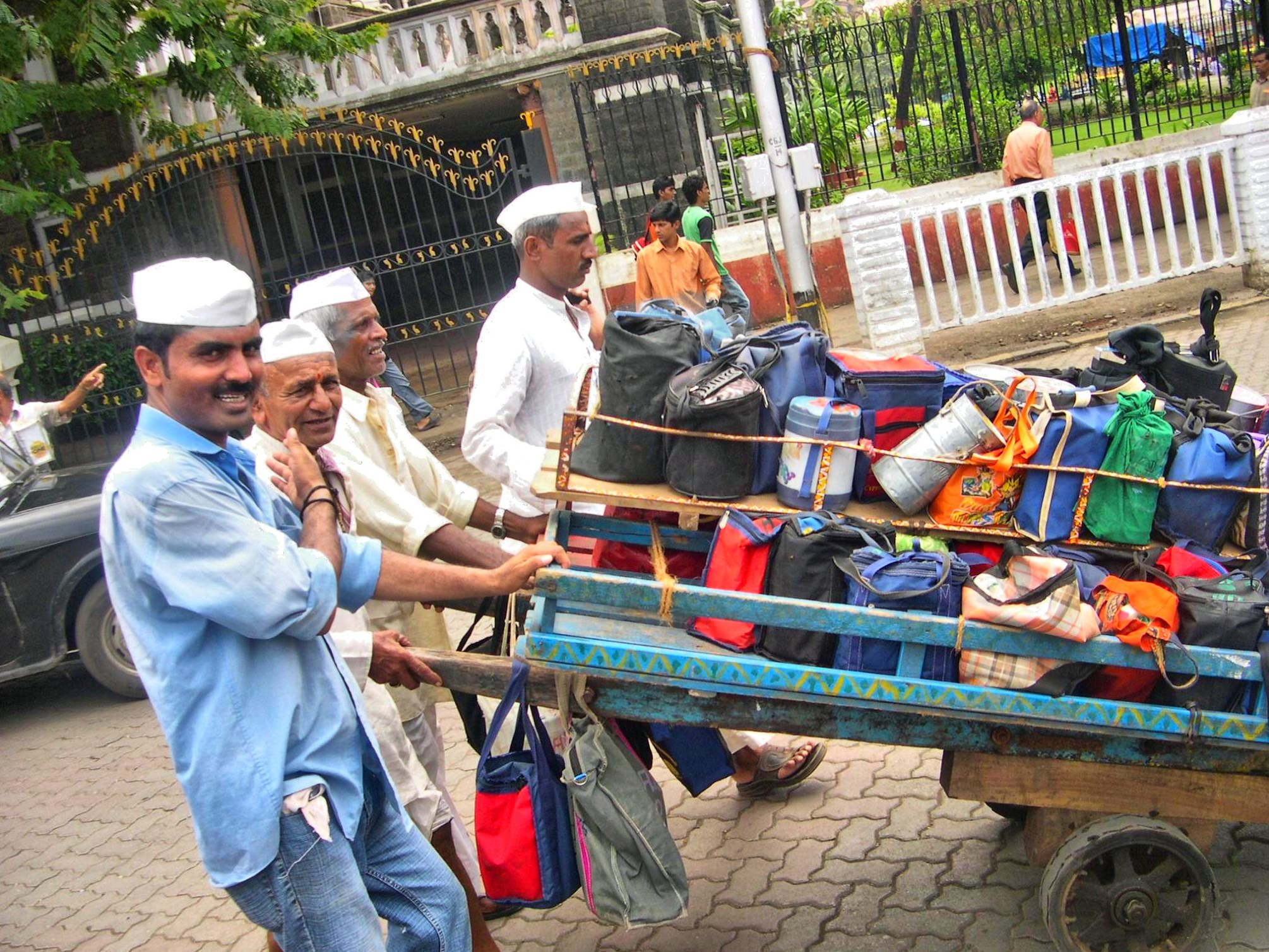
It was estimated in 2007 that the dabbawala industry was growing by 5–10% per annum.

Each dabbawala, regardless of role, is paid around 8,000 rupees per month (about US$131 in 2014). Between 175,000 and 200,000 lunch boxes are moved each day by 4,500 to 5,000 dabbawalas. Dabbawalas are self-employed. The union initiation fee is 30,000 rupees, which guarantees a 5,000-rupee monthly income and a job for life. The 150 rupee a month fee provides for delivery six days a week. (2002)

It is frequently claimed that dabbawalas make less than one mistake in every six million deliveries; however, this is only an estimation from Ragunath Medge, the president of the Mumbai Tiffinmen's Association in 1998, and is not from a rigorous study. Medge told Subrata Chakravarty, the lead author of the "Fast Food" article by Forbes where this claim first appeared, that dabbawalas make a mistake "almost never, maybe once every two months" and this statement was extrapolated by Subrata Chakravarty to be a rate of "one mistake in 8 million deliveries." Chakravarty recalled the affair in an interview and said:

Forbes never certified the dabbawalas as being a six-sigma organization. In fact, I never used the term at all. As you know, six-sigma is a process, not a statistic. But it is commonly associated with a statistic of 1.9 errors per billion operations, and that is what caused the confusion ... I was impressed by the efficiency and complexity of the process by which some 175,000 tiffin boxes were sorted, transported, delivered and returned each day by people who were mostly illiterate and unsophisticated. I asked the head of the organization how often they made a mistake. He said almost never, maybe once every two months. Any more than that would be unforgivable to customers. I did the math, which works out to one mistake in 8 million deliveries—or 16 million, since the tiffin carriers are returned home each day. That is the statistic I used. Apparently, at a conference in 2002, a reporter asked the president ... whether the tiffinwallahs were a six-sigma organization. He said he didn't know what that was. When told about the 1.9 error-per-billion statistics, I'm told he said: "Then we are. Just ask Forbes". The reporter, obviously without having read my story, wrote that Forbes had certified the tiffinwallahs as a six-sigma organization. That phrase was picked up and repeated by other reporters in other stories and now seems to have become part of the folklore.

The New York Times reported in 2007 that the 125-year-old dabbawala industry continues to grow at a rate of 5–10% per year.

== Studies ==
Various studies have focused on dabbawalas:

- In 2001, Pawan G. Agrawal carried out his PhD research in "A Study & Logistics & Supply Chain Management of Dabbawala in Mumbai". He presented his results on the efficiency of Dabbawallas in various fora.
- In 2005, the Indian Institute of Management (Ahmedabad) featured a case study on the Mumbai Dabbawallas from a management perspective of logistics.
- In 2010, Harvard Business School added the case study The Dabbawala System: On-Time Delivery, Every Time to their compendium for its high level of service with a low-cost and simple operating system.
- In 2014, Uma S. Krishnan completed her PhD research in "A Cross-Cultural Study of the Literacy Practices of The Dabbawalas: Towards a New Understanding of Non-mainstream Literacy and its Impact on Successful Business Practices."

== Notable events ==
- Dabbawallas were invited to the wedding of Prince Charles and Camilla Parker Bowles in 2005.
- As of 2010, the dabbawallas were chosen by Bharti Airtel to distribute advertising pamphlets, with a commission for every dabbawalla.
- On 21 March 2011, Prakash Baly Bachche carried three dabbawalla tiffin crates on his head at one time, which was entered as a Guinness World Record.
- In 2011, dabbawalas went on strike for the first time in 120 years to promote and attend a rally at Azad Maidan to support Anna Hazare as part of the 2011 Indian anti-corruption movement.
- Over the years, the dabbawallas have been visited by many prominent personalities like Charles, Prince of Wales, Richard Branson and then US Commerce Secretary, Gary Locke.

== In popular culture ==
The 2007 marathi film Mumbaicha Dabewala and 2013 Bollywood film The Lunchbox are based on the dabbawala service.

The Top Gear: India Special, a special episode of the British TV series Top Gear, had the presenters Jeremy Clarkson, Richard Hammond and James May attempting to outdo the dabbawalas in efficiency and accuracy, by delivering the lunches with their cars, rather than by train and bicycle.
