= Lotus T125 =

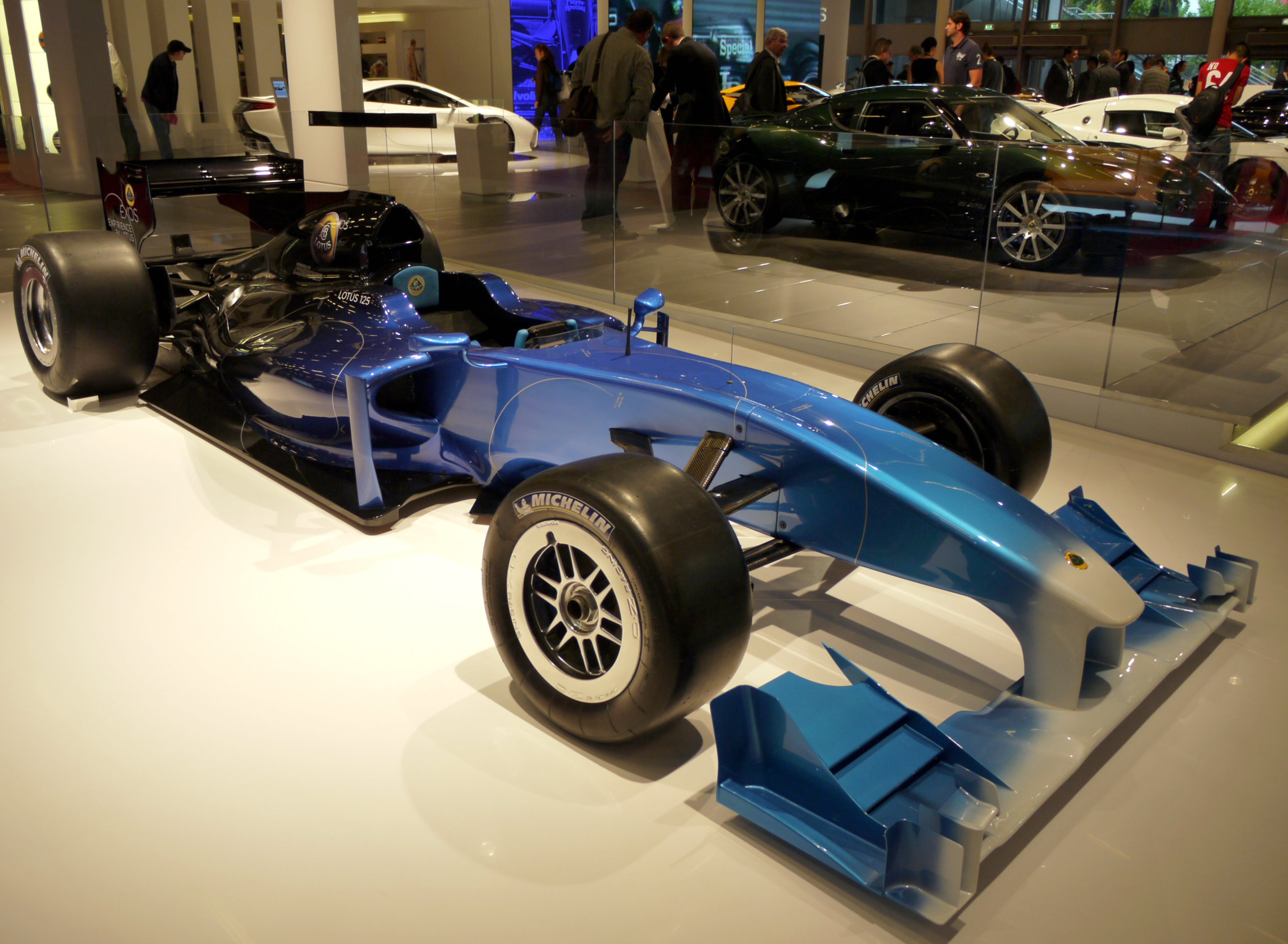

Overview
- Manufacturer: Lotus Cars
- Also called: Lotus Exos T125; Rodin FZED
- Assembly: United Kingdom: Hethel (Lotus Cars) Farnham, (Rodin Cars)

Body and chassis
- Class: Open-wheel race car
- Body style: Monoposto
- Layout: mid-mounted

Powertrain
- Engine: Cosworth GPV8
- Capacity: 3,800 cc (231.9 cu in)
- Power output: 640 hp @ 10,000 rpm
- Transmission: Ricardo 6-speed sequential transmission

Dimensions
- Wheelbase: 3,350 mm (132 in)
- Length: 4,990 mm (196 in)
- Height: 920 mm (36 in)
- Kerb weight: 650 kg (1,433 lb)

The Lotus T125, also known as the Lotus Exos, is a single seater open-wheel sports car produced by Lotus Cars. In 2019, Rodin Cars began building the T125 under the name Rodin FZED. With the official test driver being former Force India test driver James Rossiter

== Background ==
The T125 was part of Lotus Cars repositioning under new CEO, Dany Bahar, which included several new Lotus to be launched alongside the T125 halo car. The car was shown for the first time at Pebble Beach in 2010. Ahead of the 2010 Paris Motor Show, Bahar invited several potential buyers to the factory in Hethel, before flying the individuals first class to a private viewing of the T125 in the basement of the Louvre in Paris. The event was attended by Sir Stirling Moss and Takuma Sato.

Owners of the T125 would join the Exos Experience by Lotus. The private club offered expert engineers to support optimum performance of the cars, nutritionists to develop the drivers physique and a private concierge to facilitate track bookings and transportation around the globe. Events were planned for members at Paul Ricard Circuit in France, and the Portimão Circuit in Portugal.

The T125 had its public track debut in January 2011 at Vallelunga Circuit in Italy driven by Jean Alesi and James Rossiter.

=== Specification ===
The T125 is powered by a Cosworth 3.8 liter GP V8 engine producing 640bhp linked to a 6-speed semi automatic gearbox with paddle shifters. The vehicle is started by push-button, as opposed to a normal Formula One race car which is started by a team of mechanics using specialized equipment. The T125 is manufactured from a mix of carbon composite, Nomex and aluminum weighing 590kg.

Owners of the car could opt for several liveries including an Exos special in white and blue, a heritage design in green and gold, a John Player Special black livery or speed yellow inspired by Ayrton Senna's Camel Lotus of the 1980s.

=== Sales ===
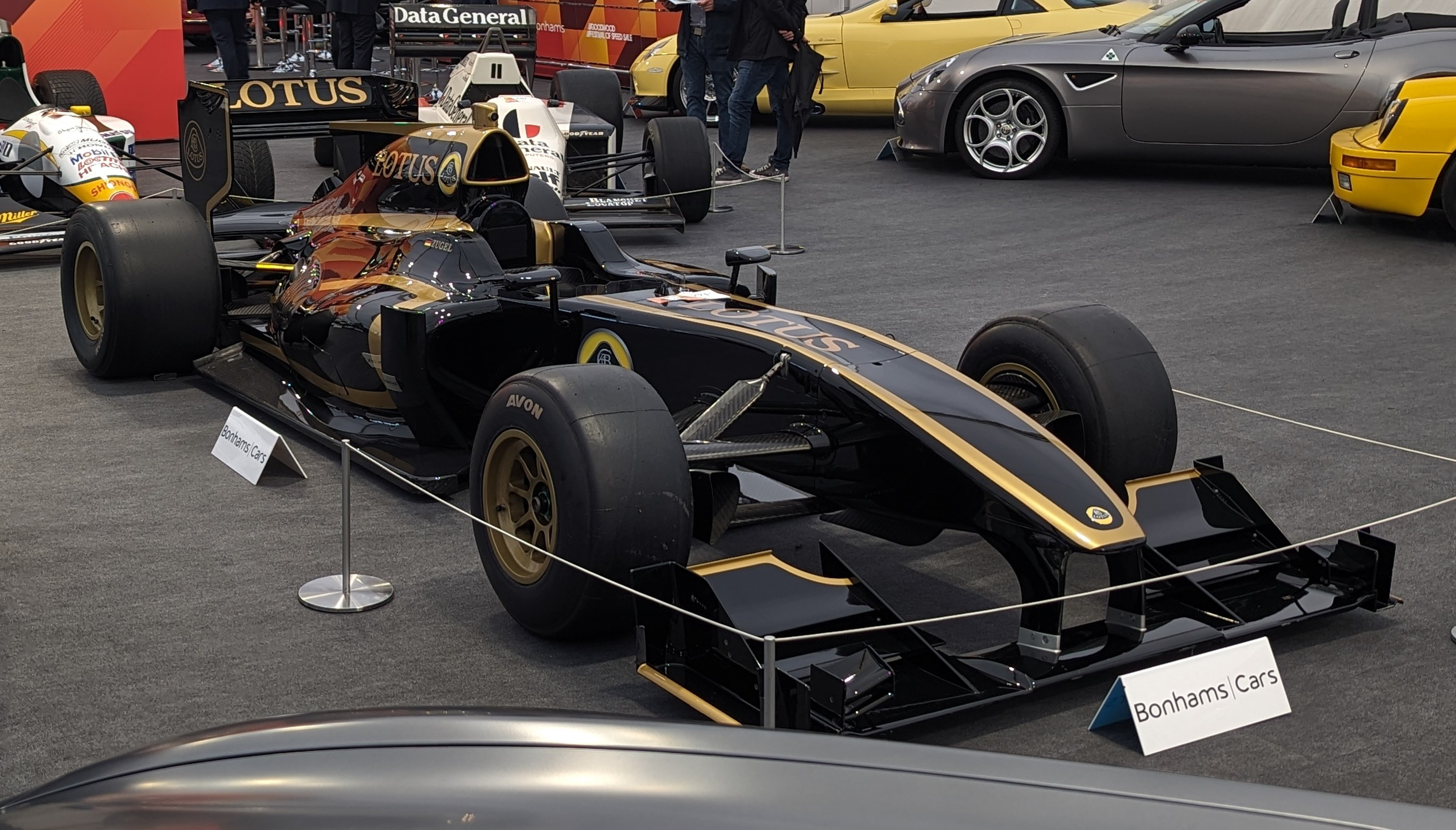
Chassis C003 for sale at Goodwood in 2023

Originally anticipated to be a run of 25 cars, only 6 chassis were built by Lotus. Only a handful of T125's have been sold on the open market. Chassis P002 used in Top Gear and tested by Romain Grosjean, was sold in 2025 for just under $174,000. Chassis C003 was delivered new to the United States, and displayed at Palm Beach International Raceway before being sold at auction in 2019 for $417,500. The same chassis was sold at Amelia Island in 2022 for $380,000 and at the Goodwood Festival of Speed in 2023 for £287,500. Chassis C018, delivered new to Germany in 2016, was sold at Sotheby's Monaco 2024 auction for €320,000.

== Rodin FZED ==
Rodin Cars of New Zealand acquired several T125 Chassis and began offering an enhanced version - known as the Rodin FZED - to the public for $650,000. In total, Rodin built 4 FZEDs from scratch and completed chassis C018 which Lotus had started before the project was abandoned.

=== Formula UK ===
In late 2016, Rodin Cars proposed a new one make racing series for the T125 to be called Formula UK. Backed by Chadwick Motorsport, the aim was to create a British version of the Japanese Super Formula series. The first season of Formula UK was due to be in December 2017, but it never gained momentum and was abandoned.

== In popular culture ==
The T125 appeared on Top Gear in July 2011, driven by Jeremy Clarkson. Clarkson was assisted in learning to drive the car by former Ferrari F1 driver, Jean Alesi.
