= Kyaraben =

Elaborately decorated Japanese box meals

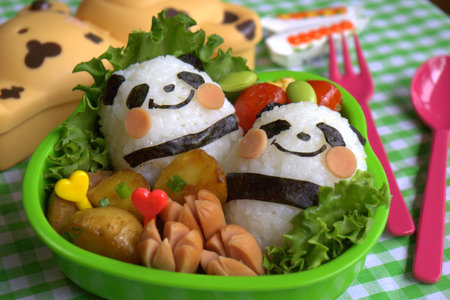
A kyaraben containing rice balls decorated to resemble pandas

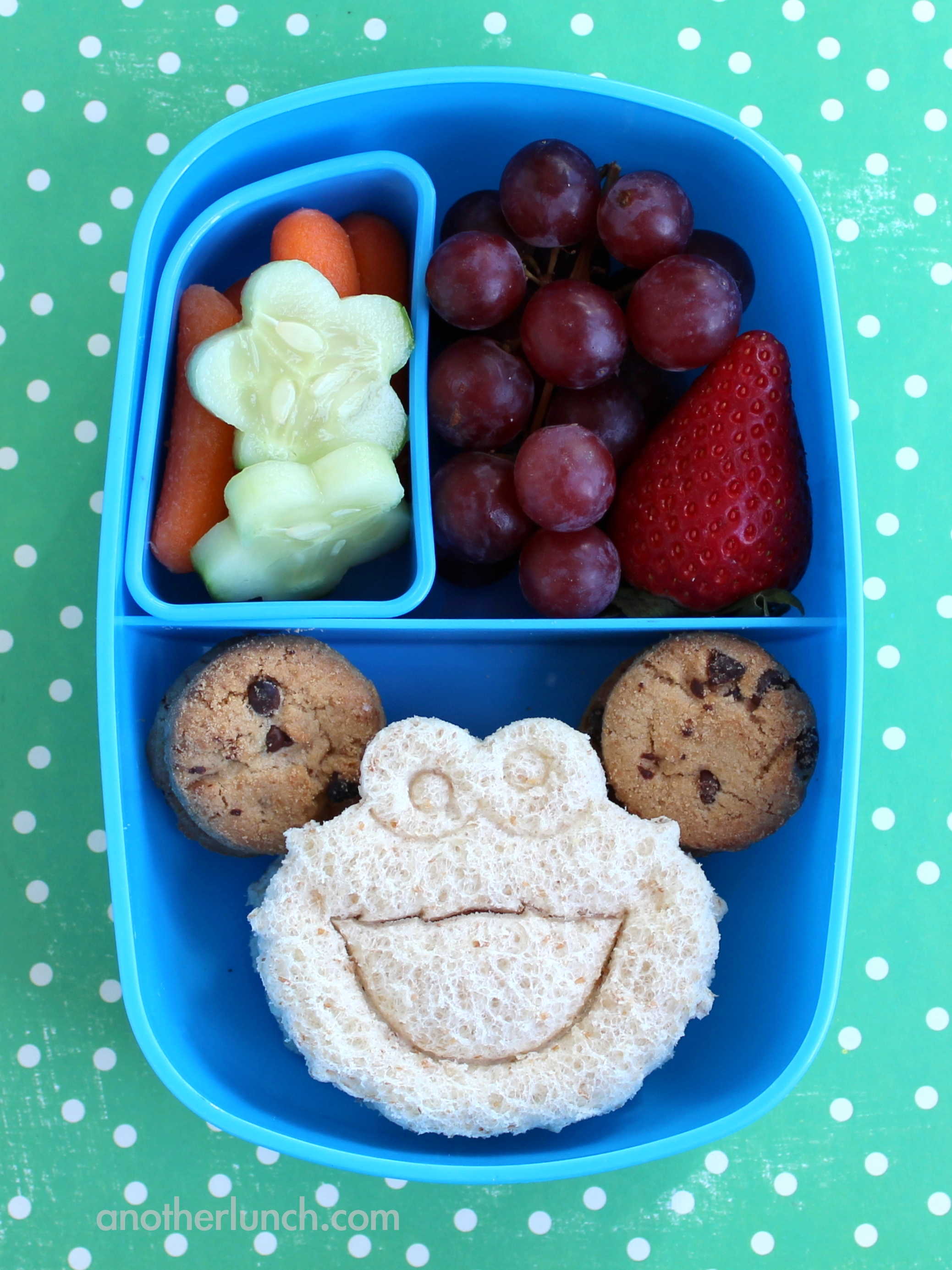
Cookie Monster preschool lunch in a bento box

Kyaraben or charaben (キャラ弁) is a shortened form of character bento (キラクター弁当, kyarakutā bentō). Derived from the traditional bento box of Japan, kyaraben became a fun way to make meals for children beginning in the 1990s. It is a style of elaborately arranged bento (Japanese boxed lunch), which features food decorated to look like animals, plants, traditions, characters from popular media, and more. Pandas and bears are two popular animals people make into kyaraben. Characters from children's media, such as Pikachu from the anime Pokémon and Totoro from the Studio Ghibli animated movie My Neighbor Totoro, are often arranged in kyaraben. Even western cartoon characters are depicted, and kyaraben is enjoyed by westerners as well as Japanese. Japanese homemakers often spend time devising their families' meals, including their boxed lunches. Kyaraben is especially popular among mothers.

Originally, a decorated bento was intended to interest children in their food and to encourage a wider range of eating habits. It has now evolved into a cultural symbol, to the point where national contests are held.

== History ==
The 17th century marked the birth of the bentō in Japan when farmers began to use wooden containers to take their food to work. These containers allowed meals to become portable for the working class, where food such as rice and vegetables could be stored. In the 18th century, bentos became popular portable meal choices for special occasions. For example, it has become a tradition to bring bentos to view the cherry blossoms for the Japanese tradition hanami.

As time passed, Japanese bento boxes became more elaborate and were used to transport more food for other special occasions, such as when people watched plays. Rice, fish cakes, and side dishes were popular choices of food to add to a bento, and have remained popular bento foods in the 21st century. During the late 1800s, people ate bento on the newly established trains. During the Shōwa era, a new type of bento emerged: The Shokado. The Shokado bento could be used to create everyday meals. Put simply, bento boxes are used for portable meals, such as lunches at work or school, as well as special occasions.

The 1990s is when the kyaraben bento emerged. Kyaraben is a famous type of Japanese bento where people use food to create famous characters from popular culture, including characters from the hit children's anime Pokémon and the cute characters from Sanrio, such as Hello Kitty. Kyaraben, also known as character bento, is a cute and fun type of bento parents make for their children. It is popular with women and mothers, who often enjoy sharing their creations on blogs and social media platforms.

== How to make ==
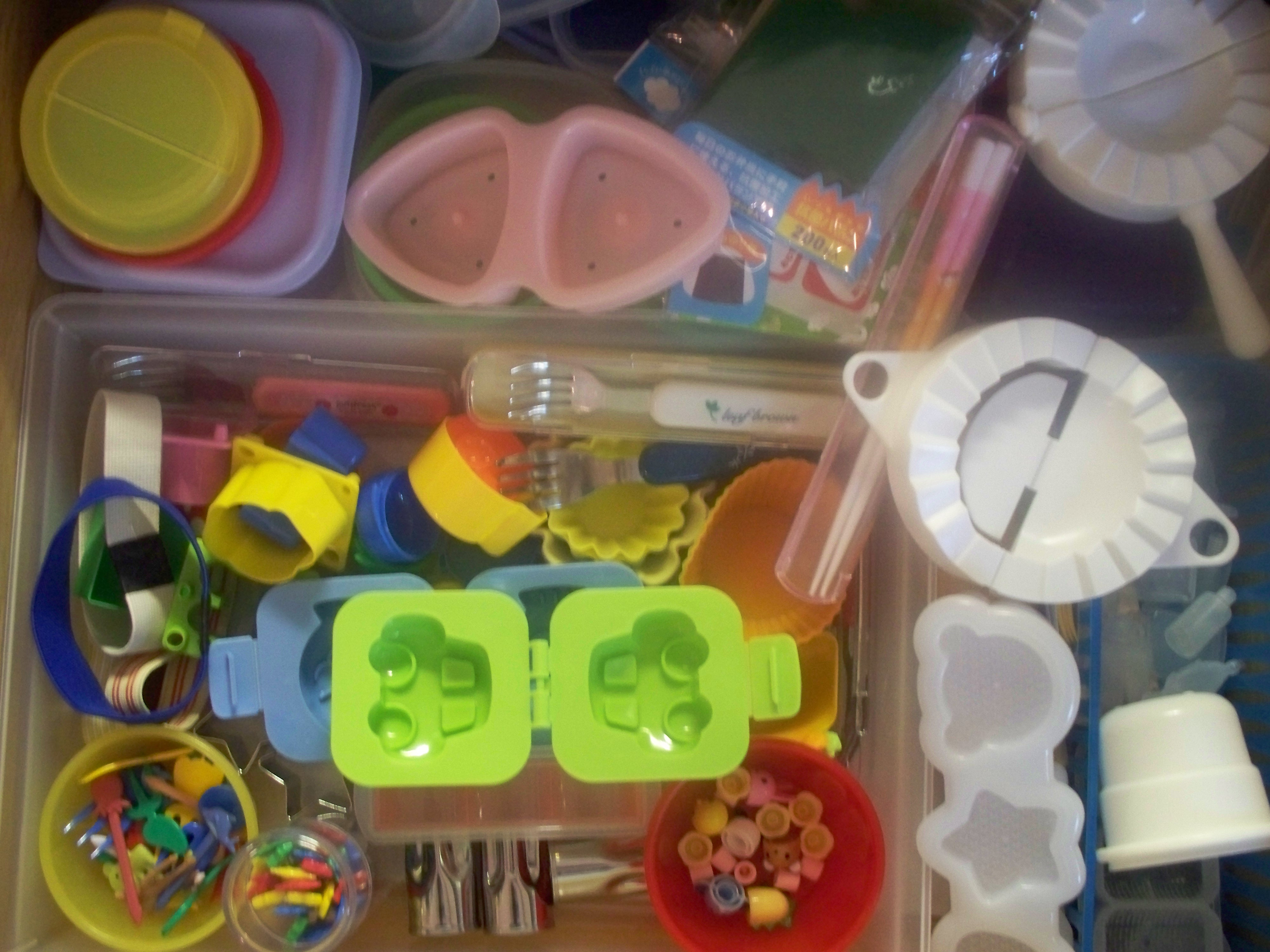
Bento-making tools

To make kyaraben, different types of food, such as seaweed and carrots, are cut into shapes and placed on rice balls to make characters. A variety of tools are needed to cut, punch, and shape food into different shapes and characters. Scissors and nori punches can punch out pieces of food, for example. Tweezers are helpful for picking up, moving, and placing the little bits of food together to create the character. Other recommended kyaraben-making tools include molds, food cutters, stamps, slicers, and bento picks decorated with cute characters, food, or objects for a fun eating experience.

== Importance to family ==
Kyaraben is important to families, especially mothers and children. Japanese mothers use it as a means to express their creativity and culture while making food fun for their children. Many of these women share their kyaraben creations on their own personal blogs, where they can connect with other women.

Children enjoy kyaraben because their food is decorated as their favorite animals or cartoon characters. This cute fun prompts socialization and helps children make friends.

== Importance to Japanese culture ==
Kyaraben is important to Japanese culture because it is a way for mothers to express their creativity and encourage their children to eat certain foods. People can decorate their character bentos to symbolize traditions and seasons.

Kyaraben is important to Japanese culture because of the diverse and artistic array of bento boxes, as well as its ability to harbor all five senses and all five different flavors, including umami.

== Role in popular culture and the global world ==
Kyaraben lunchboxes are a major plot element in Bento Monogatari, a 2010 short film by Belgian director Pieter Dirkx. This film is about a woman interested in popular culture, who prepares bento for her husband in an attempt to mend their marriage. Kyaraben is influenced by popular culture because people decorate their bento with characters from cartoons, anime, manga, and video games.

Kyaraben is gaining worldwide popularity, such as in countries like France and Italy, and a 2014 contest held by the government helped introduce foreigners to Japanese food.

Japanese artist Mari Miyazawa has gained international recognition for combining kyaraben with stop-motion animation using food, most notably in her long-running NHK series Konigiri-kun, which features a rice-ball character based on her bento art, and has given talks and workshops on the subject in the United Kingdom and Croatia.

== See also ==
- Ekiben
- Makunouchi
