= Hrous =

Tunisian chili paste

Hrous, or hrouss, is a Tunisian spicy chili pepper paste condiment.

Two types exist: The first one, a simple paste prepared from fresh chili peppers with a few spices., is most prevalent in the North-East, while the second type is the hrouss specific to the Gabes region, prepared with equal portions of salt-pickled onions and dried chili pepper powder.

== Etymology ==
The name of the condiment comes from the Arabic verb harasa (Arabic: هرس) meaning "to crush" or "mash", hrous means literally "what is mashed".

The two types of Tunisian hrous differ from the Tunisian harissa, because harissa is prepared using dry peppers (instead of fresh ones) and some spices but never includes onions (unlike the hrous from Gabes).

== Nord-Eastern and commercial large-scale produced hrous ==
This first sort of hrous consists of chopped fresh spicy peppers (either all red or a mix of red and green peppers), to which are added pureed garlic, ground coriander seeds, ground carraway seeds and some salt. It can be eaten immediately.

This hrous, sometimes called Nebli (i.e., from the city of Nabeul), to differentiate it from the Gabes recipe, can be prepared at any time of the year in the family kitchen but can also be bought by weight in local delis or in glass jars or cans as it is produced industrially on a large scale by several companies^{,}. This hrous is used to spice the lablabi but also rice, pasta and couscous dishes as well as soups with meat, poultry, fish or shellfish^{,}.

== Preparation of the Gabes hrous ==
In summer, red onions are cut in squares or thin strips and kneaded with salt (to which a small amount of turmeric is sometimes added) before being firmly packed in a jar. The mix is regularly shaken (without opening the jar) until September, when red peppers become abundant in Tunisia. The fresh red peppers are quickly rinsed, their inner seeds are discarded, and the peppers are dried, traditionally by exposing them to the sun. Once dried, the peppers are crushed or more commonly today, taken to the small shops where they can be ground on demand.

The hrous is then prepared by mixing an equal volume of the dried powdered red chili peppers and a volume of the onions and salt (with the juice that they may have released). Both are kneaded together to give a cohesive wet-sand or paste-like texture. Olive oil is added to the mix which is kneaded again, then firmly packed in containers to which some olive oil is added on top to ensure long term room-temperature storage of the hrous. The paste should be allowed to rest for at least a week, preferentially at least a month of maturing before using it,

Some families add to the mix various spices such as cinnamon, ground coriander seeds or powdered dried rose buttons but these additional spices restrict the use of the condiment paste to some specific types of dishes.

The hrous from Gabes can be bought in some food stores all over Tunisia but most of it is produced within the home environment in the region around Gabes, where it is a required component of local dishes. The hrous from Gabe is used in soups, meat, poultry and fish dishes (for example stuffed squid) as well as various types of couscous.
