= Taiwan Railway Bento =

Type of ekiben served on Taiwan Railway

Taiwan Railway Bento (TR Bento)
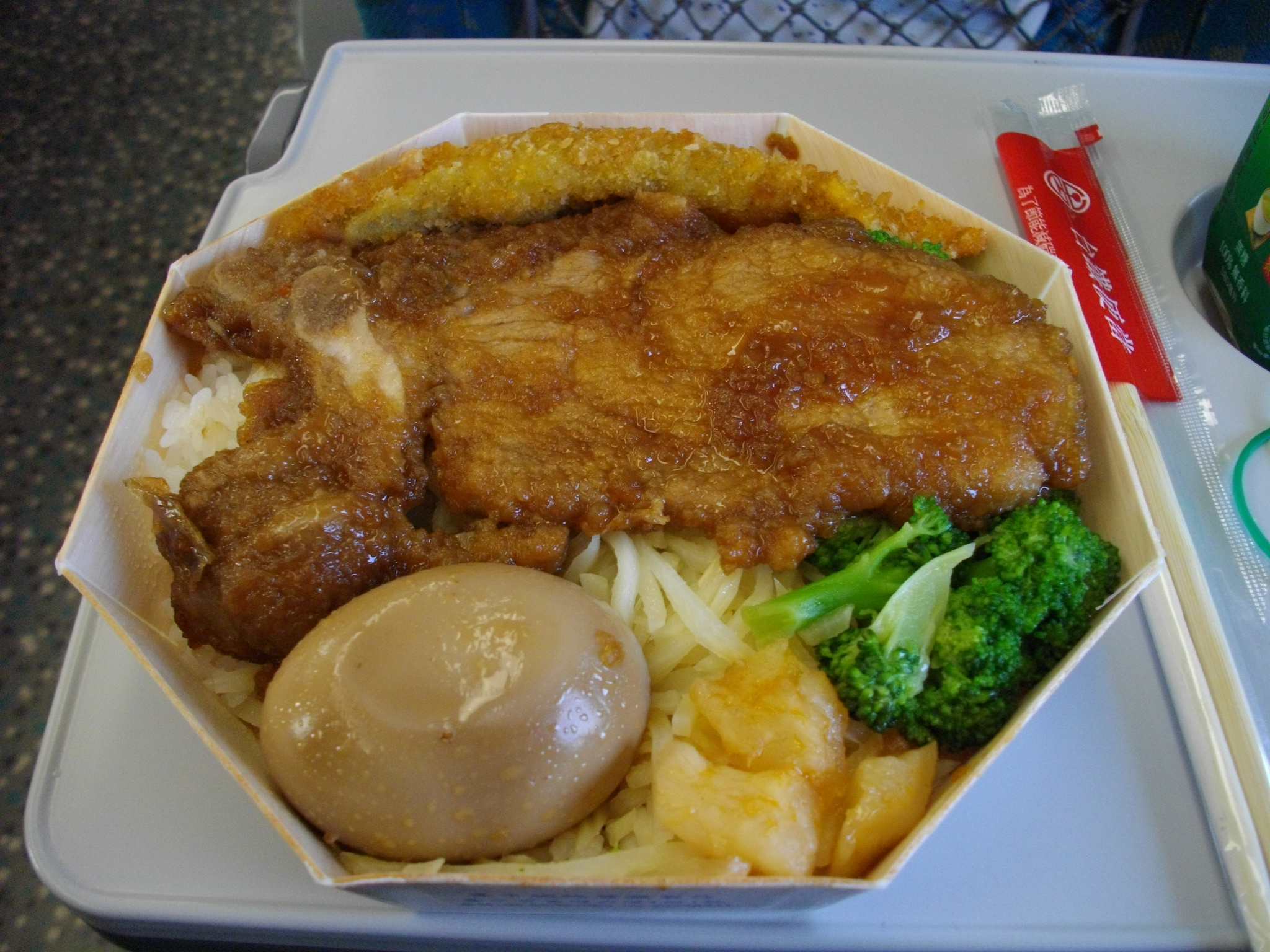
- A regular Taiwan Railway Bento
- Traditional Chinese: 臺鐵便當 or 台鐵便當
- Simplified Chinese: 台铁便当
Transcriptions
Standard Mandarin
- Hanyu Pinyin: Tái tiě biàndang
Hakka
- Romanization: Thòi-thiet-phien-tông
Southern Min
- Hokkien POJ: Tâi thih piān tong

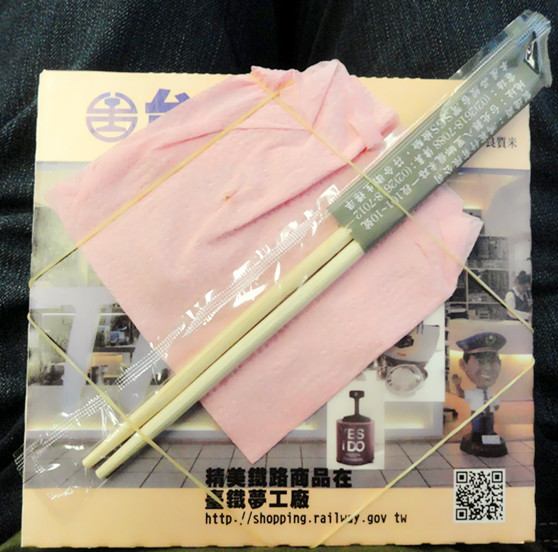
The exterior of an 80-NTD pork chop railway mealbox

Taiwan Railway Bento (Chinese: 台鐵便當; pinyin: Táitiě Biàndāng) are a type of ekiben (bento boxed meals) manufactured and distributed on Taiwan Railway at major railway stations and in train cars. It is estimated that, with five million boxed meals sold each year, the annual revenue from bento distribution is 370 million NTD (approx. US$10 million).

== History ==
During the Japanese era, train passengers either dined at a dining car or opted for an ekiben. However, ekiben boxes were only available at stations, not in train cars.

Under the Chinese Nationalists' rule from 1945 onwards, a variety of private catering services sprang up as railway transportation gained popularity. These services were then integrated by the Taiwan Railways Administration in 1960, gradually shaping the major source of revenues of the administration other than transport itself.

On 9 Jun 2000, the pork chop bento, which had been discontinued for 32 years, reappeared in public on the Railways Festival. The originally-estimated one thousand boxes to be sold turned out to be a sales of over 90 thousand due to their popularity.

On 26 Feb 2015, Keikyu Corporation, a Japanese rail operator, sold Taiwan Railway Mealboxes as a promotional event.

== Ingredients and distribution ==
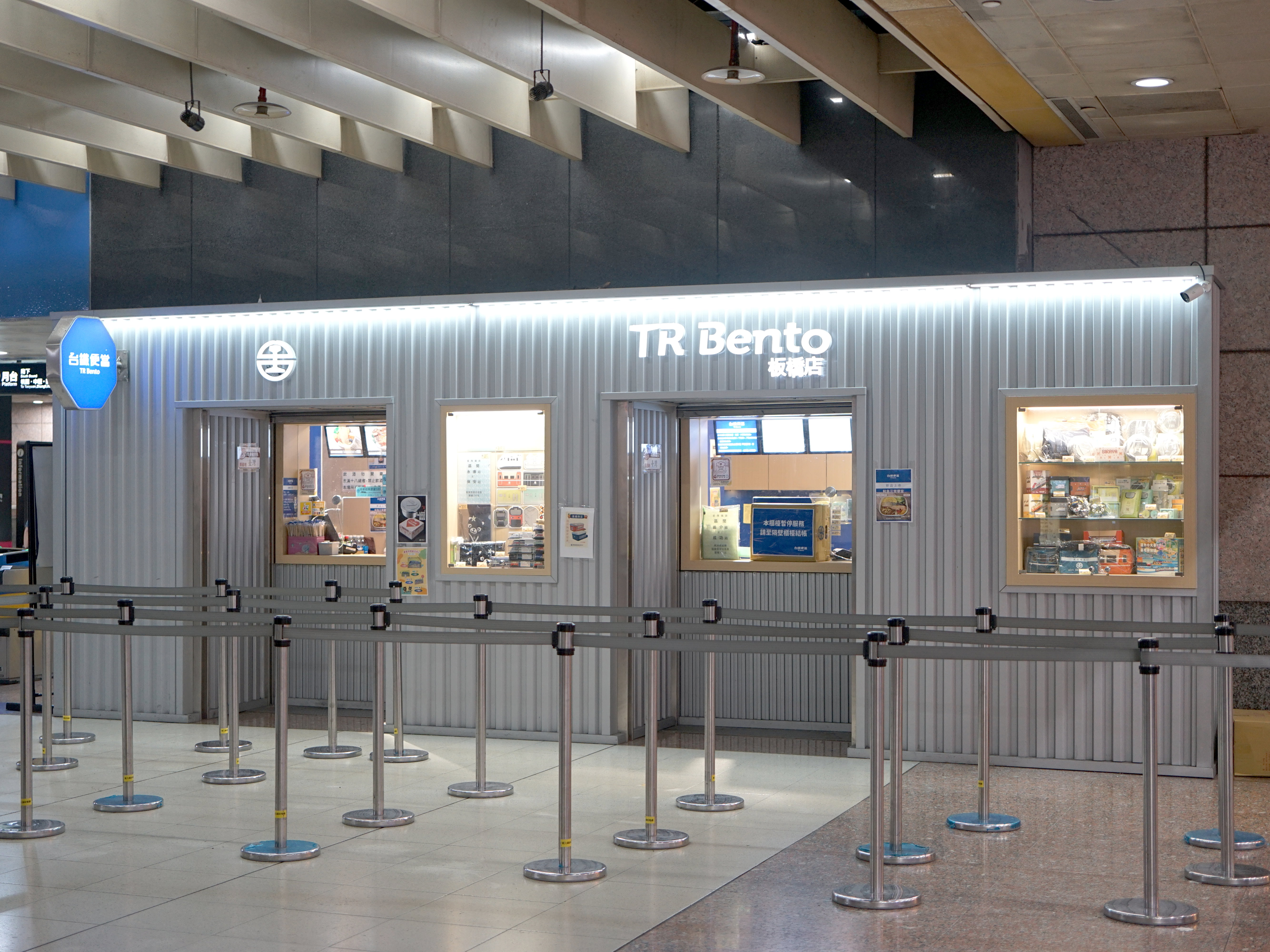
A distribution spot at Banqiao station

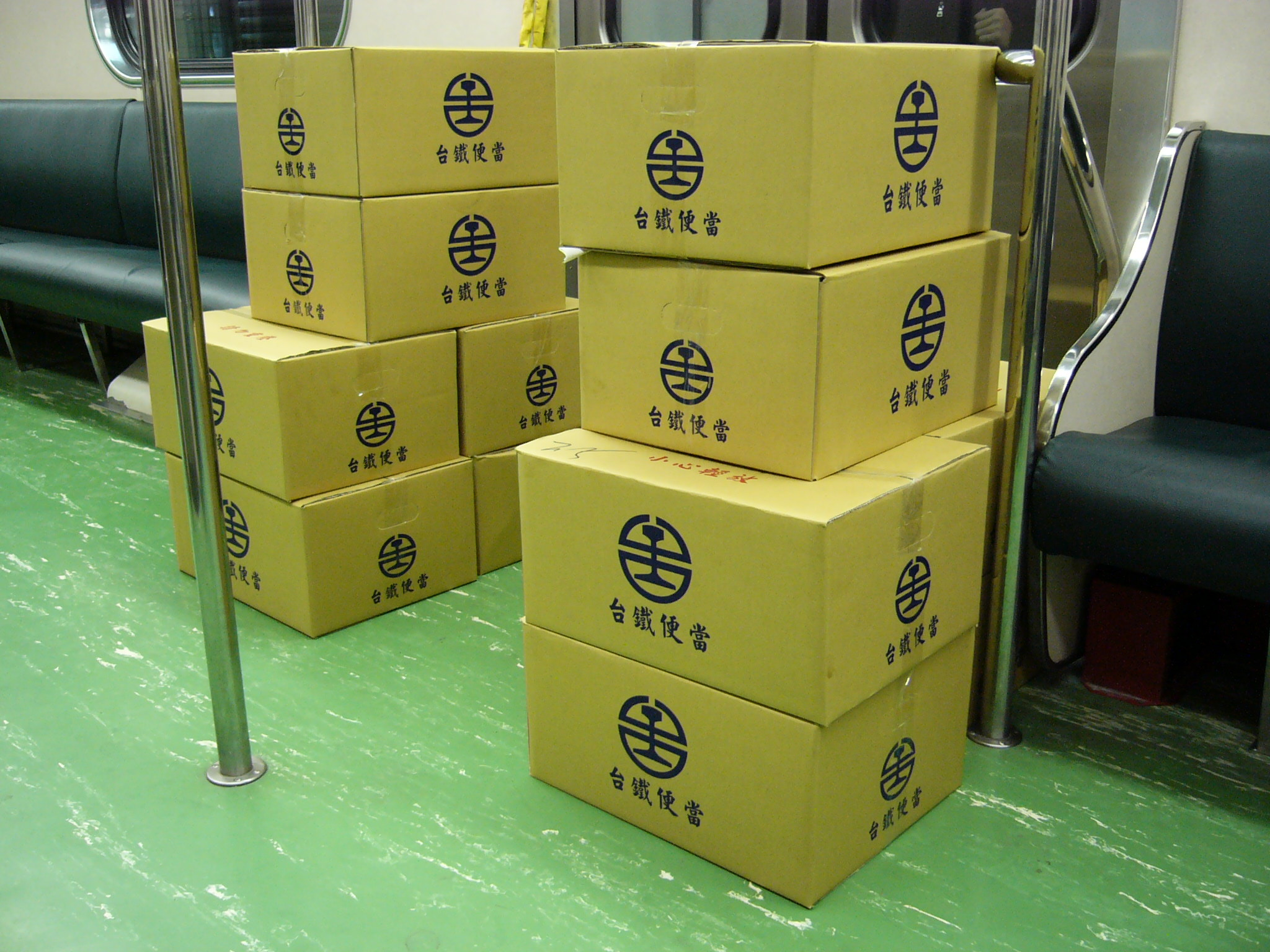
Twelve packing boxes of ekibens on an EMU 600 Local Train

Although Taiwan Railway Bentos are primarily known for their pork chop and rice, they also contain a variety of side dishes, including braised eggs, dried tofu, and pieces of dried white radish.

Taiwan Railway has established five catering zones at Songshan, Taipei, Taichung, Kaohsiung, and Hualien railway stations, where staff members of the TRA hand over mealboxes to car attendants for on-board distribution. During meal times (11:00-13:00 and 17:00–19:00), car attendants walk down the aisle of the train with a trolley, asking if there are passengers who would like a bento in Mandarin and Hokkien.

The containers were originally made of stainless steel, which were returned and washed after the contents had been consumed. However, due to exceedingly high costs and low return rates (passengers bringing the steel boxes home without permission), the administration now uses disposable paper boxes.

== Railroad Bento Festival ==
The first Formosa Railroad Bento Festival was set to take place from July 17 to 20, 2015.

== See also ==
- Taiwanese cuisine
- List of pork dishes
- Bento
- Rail transport in Taiwan
- Taiwan Railways Administration
- Transportation in Taiwan

== Bibliography ==
- 劉文駿; 王威傑; 楊森豪 (2003). 百年台灣鐵道 (in Chinese). 果實. ISBN 986-7796-11-X.
- 戴寶村; 蔡承豪 (2009). 縱貫環島‧臺灣鐵道 (in Chinese). 國立臺灣博物館. ISBN 978-986-02-1091-0.
- 洪致文 (2011). 台灣鐵道文化志 (in Chinese). 遠足文化. ISBN 978-986-6731-70-9.
