= Ekiben =

Bento sold at train stations in Japan

Ekibento
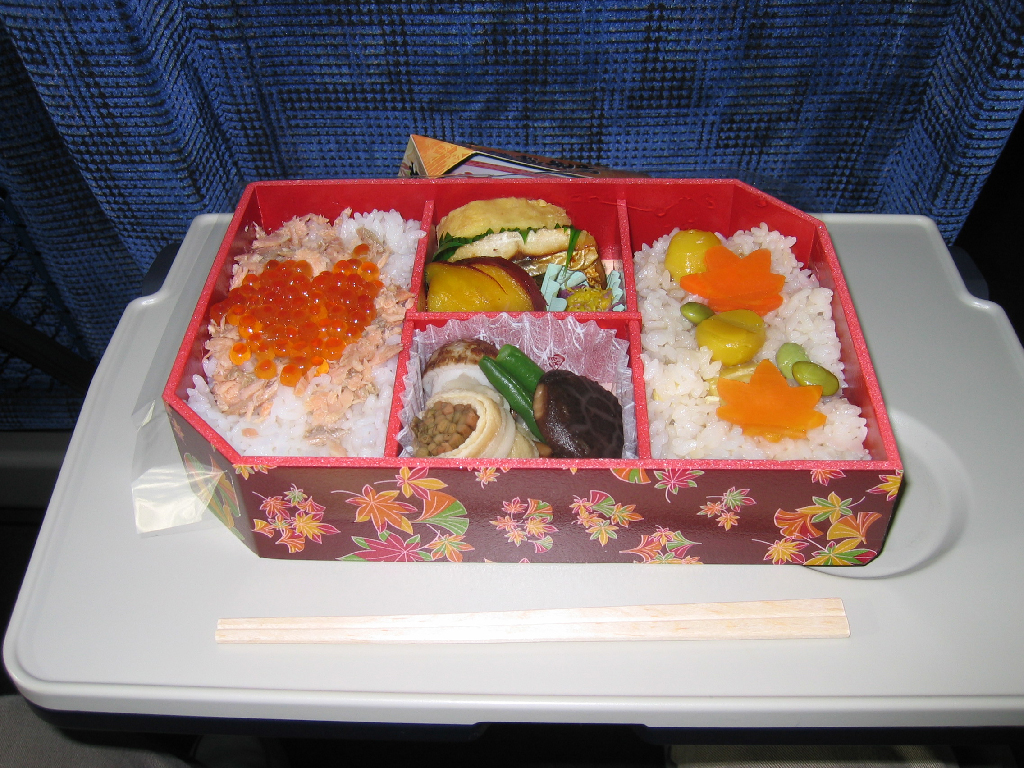
- A typical 1000-yen ekiben from Tokyo Station
- Type: Boxed meal
- Associated cuisine: Japanese

Ekiben (駅弁; railway bento) are a type of bento boxed meals, sold on trains and at train stations in Japan. They come with disposable chopsticks (when necessary) or spoons. Ekiben containers can be made from plastic, wood, or ceramic. Many train stations have become famous for their ekiben made from local food specialties (tokusanhin).

Ekiben were first sold in railway stations in the late 19th century, and developed at a time when meals on trains were necessary during a long train journey. The popularity of ekiben reached a peak in the 1980s, but declined as air travel became more affordable and trains became faster. However, numerous types of ekiben can still be purchased at stands in the station, on the platform, or on the train itself, some of which may be presented in unique containers that can serve as souvenirs or collectibles. Despite undergoing a decline in popularity in the 1990s and 2000s, ekiben remains popular among travelers, and gained popularity on the Shinkansen ever since the dining car service that replaced it was discontinued when Japan's asset price bubble burst in the early 1990s, leading to the Lost Decades.

== History ==
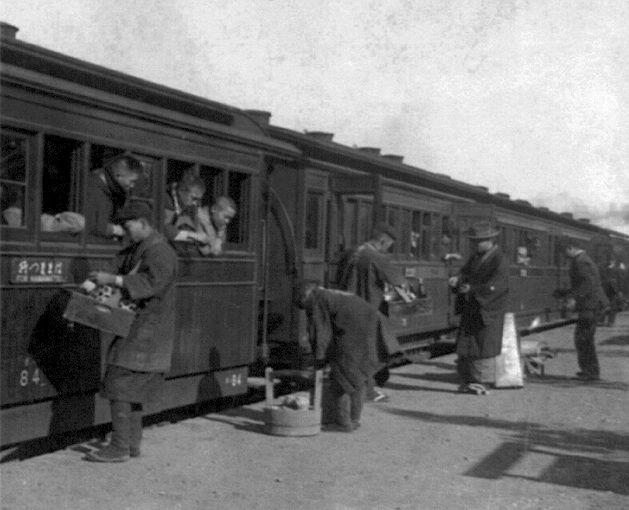
Ekiben vendors serving train passengers in 1902

The word ekiben comes from "eki", meaning railway station, and "ben", which is short for bento (box meal). Before the introduction of rail travel, travellers would prepare their own meal or buy meals kept in wooden bento boxes sold in tea houses. During the intermission of kabuki theatre performances, makunouchi-bento ("between-acts box lunches") were also sold. These would evolve into ekiben with the coming of railways. The first sale of ekiben is generally believed to have been at the Utsunomiya Station in 1885 which opened when the Nihon Tetsudo line linked the station to Ueno Station in Tokyo. In the beginning, the ekiben offered were simple fare; the ekiben offered at Utsunomiya Station were simply onigiri (rice balls) wrapped in young bamboo leaves. The idea of selling ekiben quickly spread to railway stations around the country, and in 1888, the first standard ekiben with rice and a few side dishes were sold at Himeji Station.

At the beginning of the 20th century, many stations began to offer ekiben that served meals prepared from local specialties, and ekiben then evolved into a form of meal distinct from other bento boxes. These may be developed specially and are unique to each region, and often found only at the local railway stations. A well-known example is ikameshi, squid stuffed with rice, served at the Mori Station in Hokkaido. It was first produced as an ekiben meal but has since become a noted regional dish. In many places, ekiben have become souvenirs of local specialty for tourists with unique containers and attractive packaging.

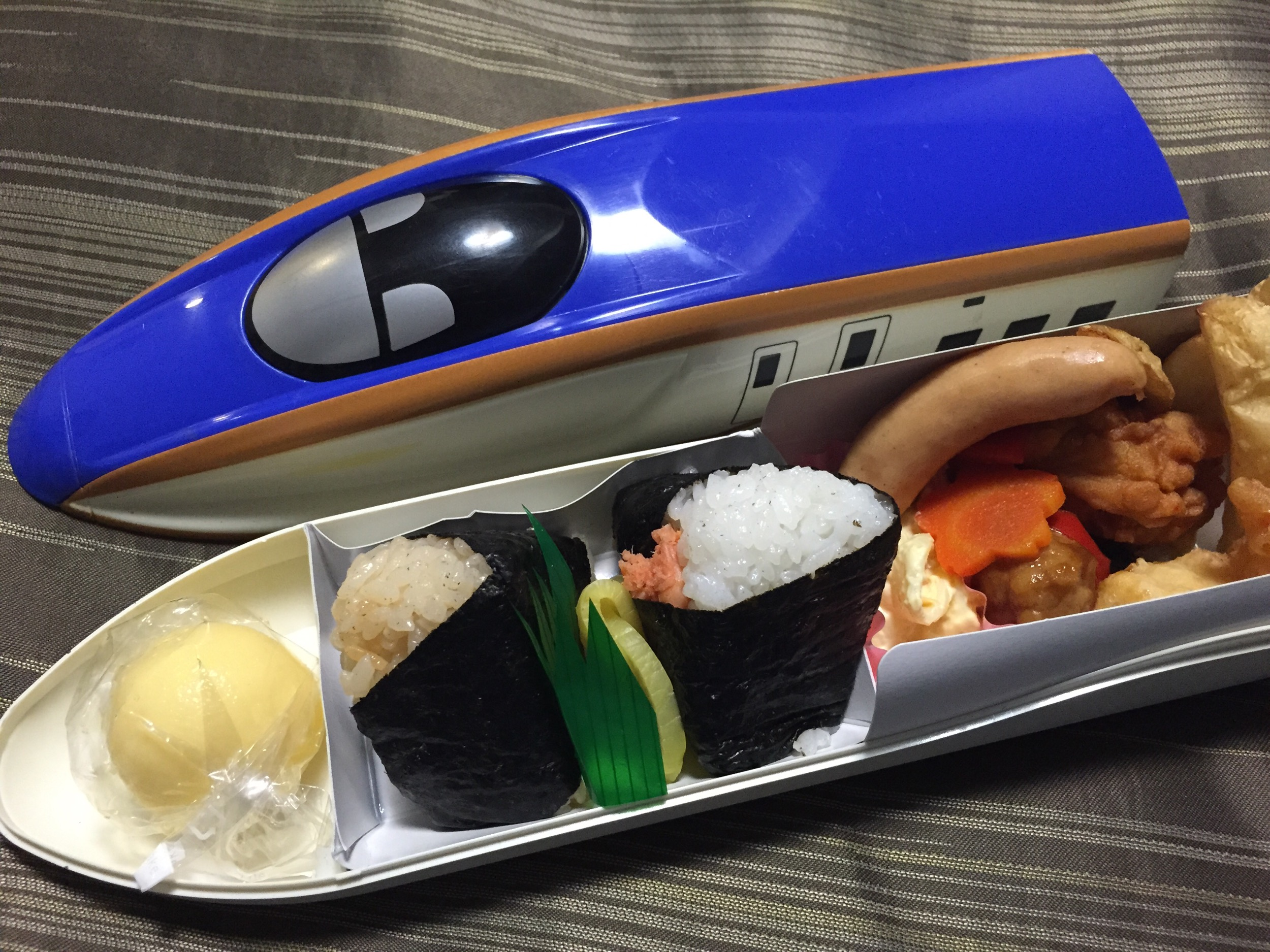
Ekiben served in a decorative box designed after the E7 Series Shinkansen

Rail travel in Japan boomed after the Second World War, and with it the popularity of ekiben. Sales of ekiben was further spurred on in the 1970s by Ekiben Hitoritabi, a drama based on a manga about a person who travelled round Japan to taste the ekiben in different parts of the country. At its height in the mid-1980s, it was estimated that twelve million boxes were consumed daily. This "Golden Age" of ekiben, however, ended in the 1980s when air travel became popular and the introduction of faster trains became more widespread. Prior to the 1980s, air travel was expensive and travelers tended to use trains which were then much slower, therefore ekiben were necessary during their long train journeys. Faster trains such as the Shinkansen also eliminated many stops along a railway journey, which contributed to its decline, and some stations no longer offer ekiben. From 1987 to 2008, there was a 50% decline in the number of ekiben makers. However, the popularity of the ekiben increased when the dining car was discontinued in the 1990s, eventually gaining popularity on the Shinkansen aside from remaining popular on the slower but cheaper commuter trains.

Ekiben are now also available outside of railway station in department stores and airports. Annual ekiben fairs are held at various department stores, the first of which was held in 1966. The largest of these are the ones at the Keio Department Store in Shinjuku Station, Tokyo, and Hanshin Department Store in Osaka. Japanese railfans who have a particular enthusiasm for ekiben are known as ekiben-tetsu.

== Types ==
There many types of different ekiben available. The standard ekiben available throughout Japan is known as makunouchi-bento, which typically features rice, grilled fish, fish cakes, pickles, and other standard elements. There are also regional varieties of ekiben that incorporate elements of the local cuisine. For example, masuzushi is a variety of ekiben from Toyama Prefecture that features trout oshizushi (pressed sushi) wrapped in bamboo leaves.

A similar style of meal is also popular in Taiwan, known as Taiwan Railway Bento.

== Gallery ==
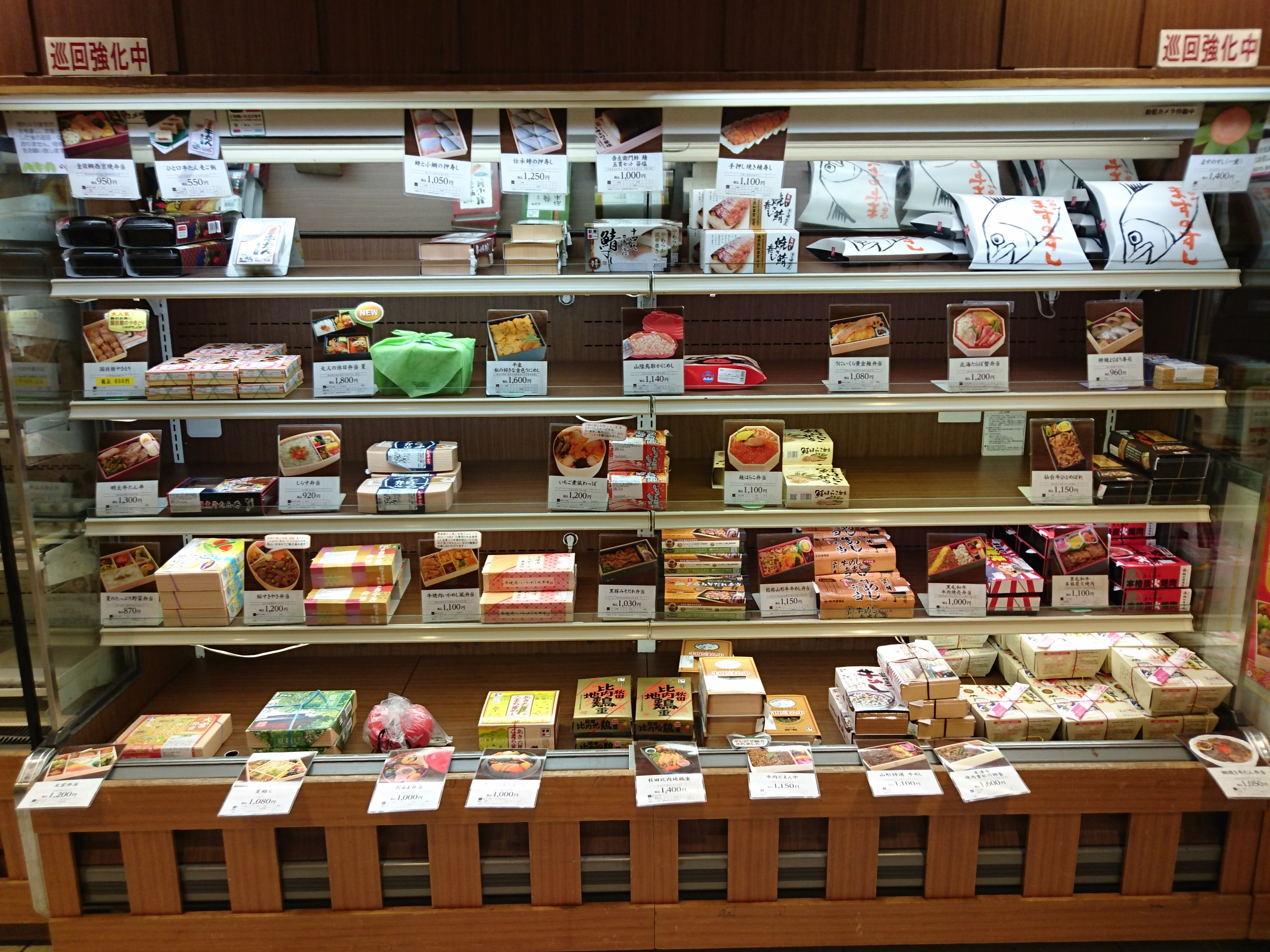
A variety of ekiben on sale at a railway station

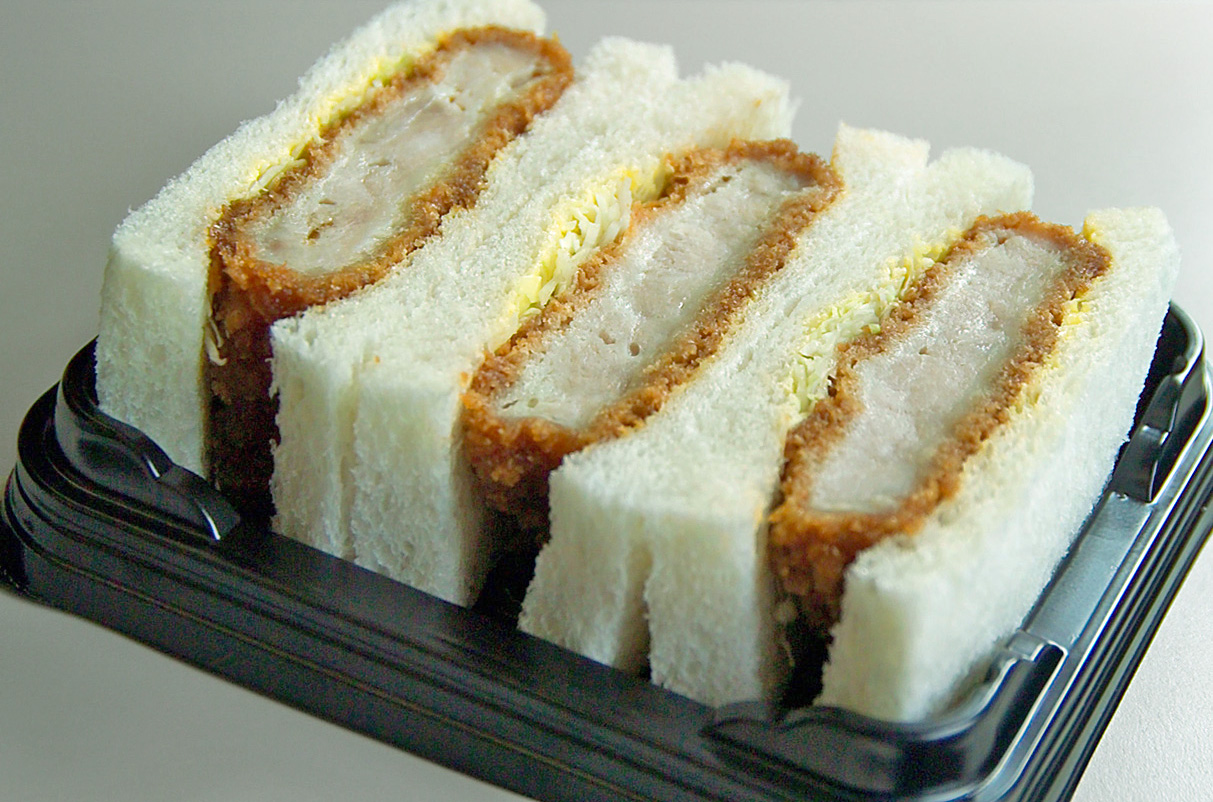
Katsu-sando served as an ekiben aboard a Shinkansen service

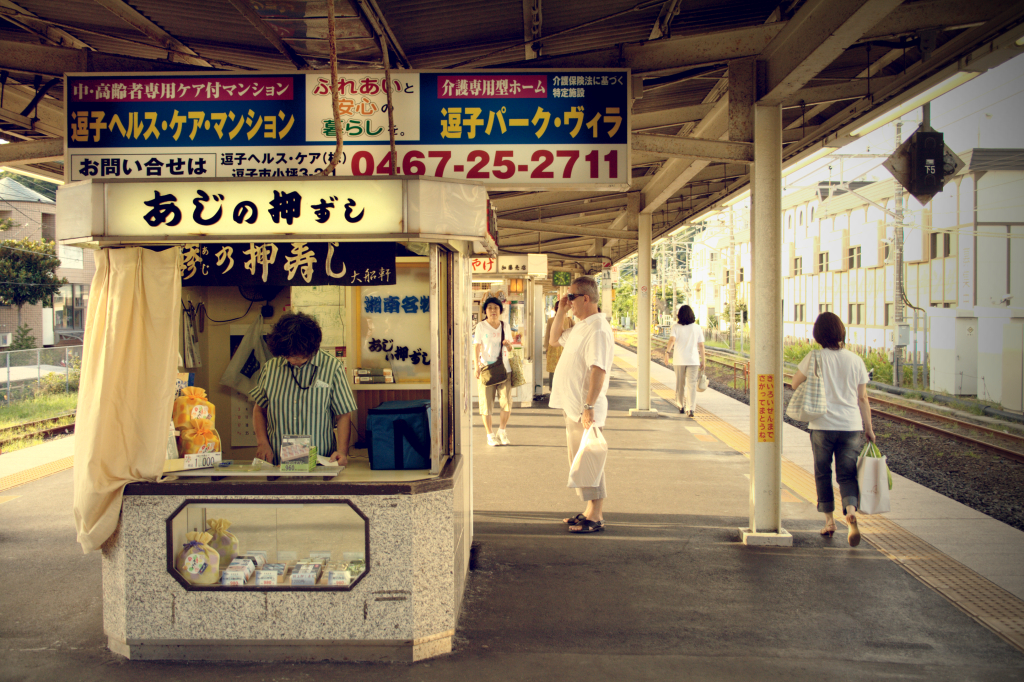
Ekiben shop on a platform at Kamakura Station

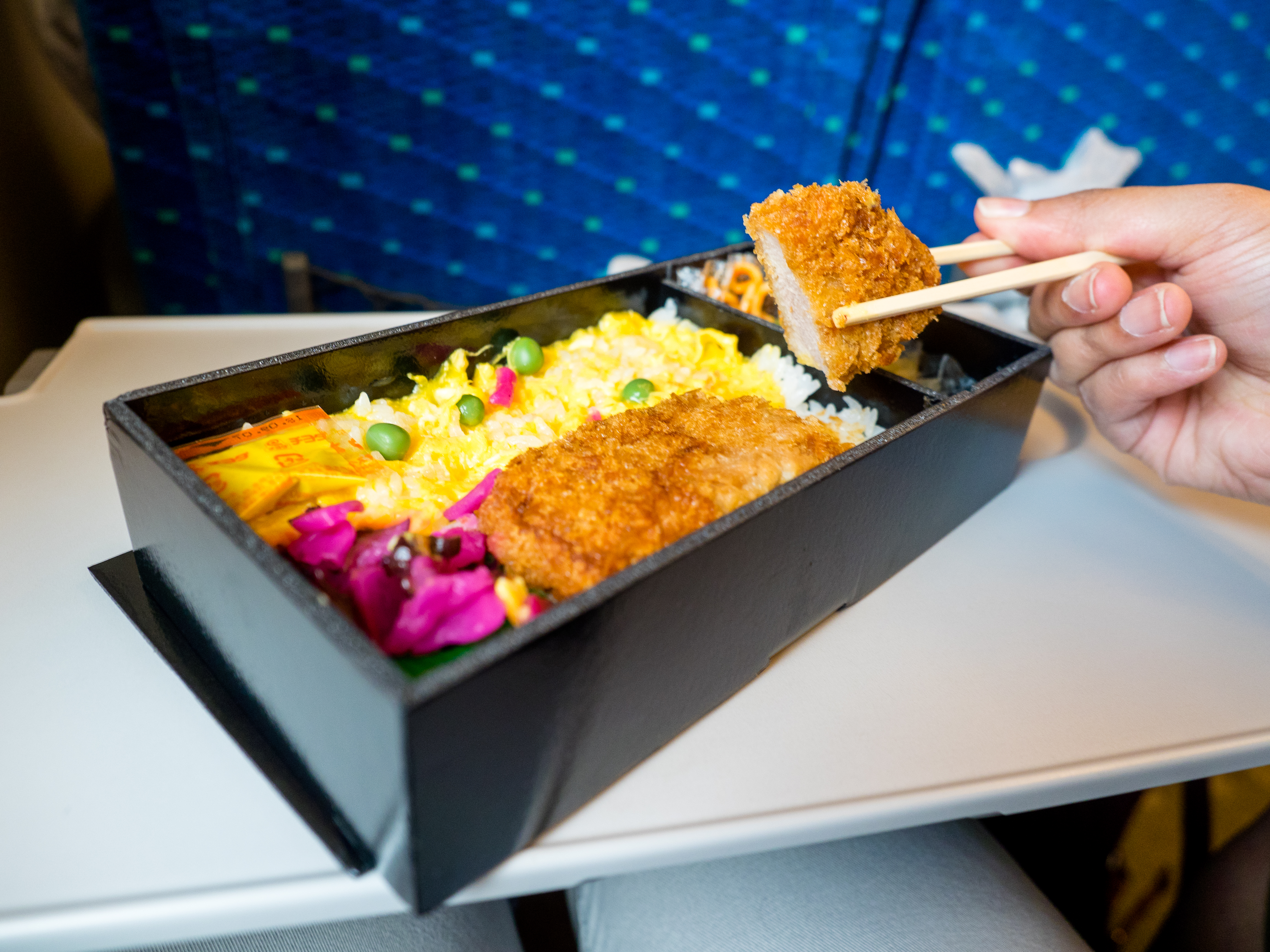
A bento box sold at Hiroshima Station

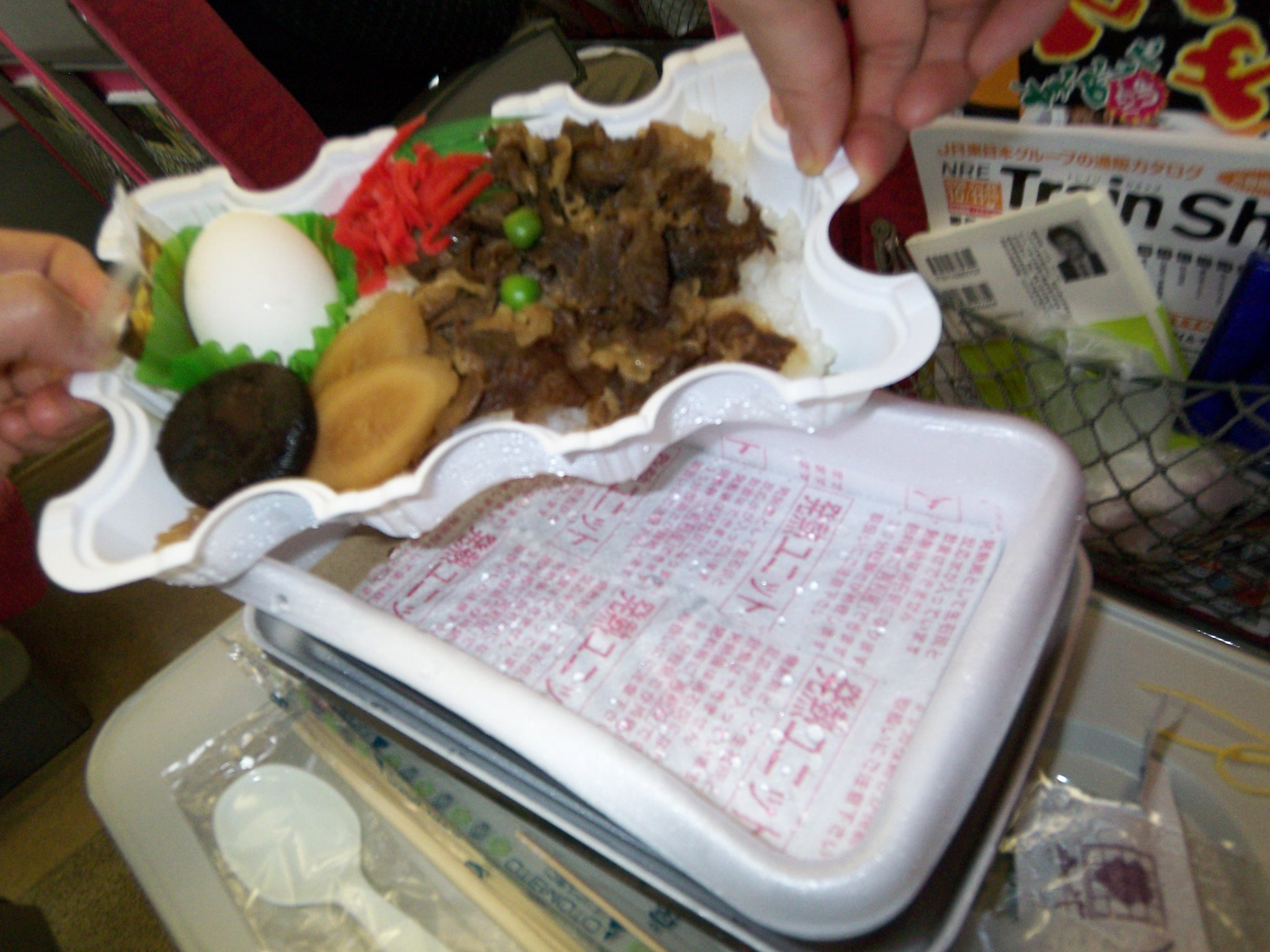
Sukiyaki bento sold at Yonezawa Station, with the heating pack used to heat the contents visible

== See also ==
- Kyaraben: elaborately arranged bento
- Ikameshi: a regional dish composed of squid cooked with rice inside
- Kamameshi: dish of rice, meat, and vegetables cooked in a pot
