= Ikameshi =

Squid rice

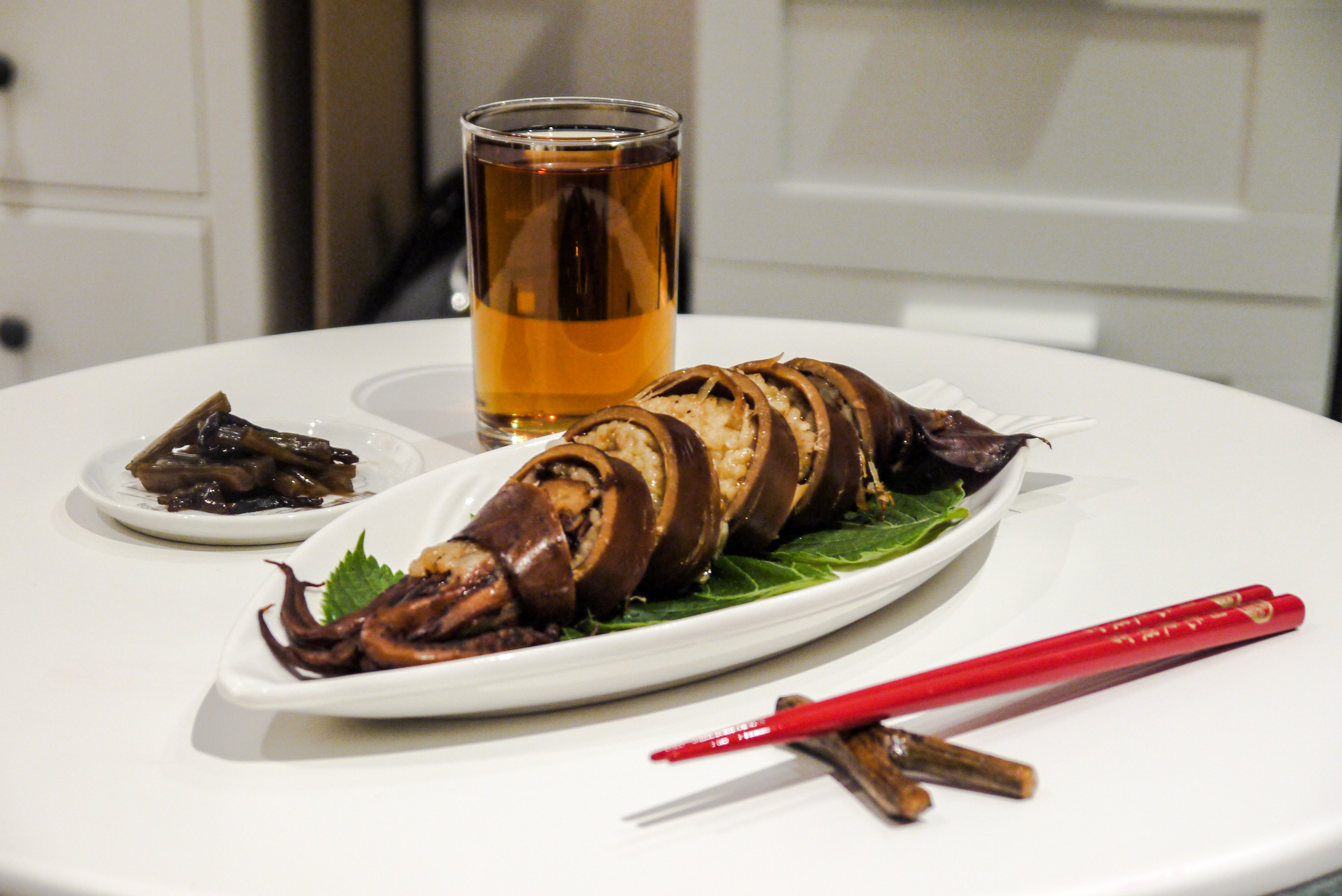
- Preserved Hokkaido ikameshi served in London.
- Alternative names: squid rice
- Place of origin: Japan
- Region or state: Oshima area of Hokkaidō
- Main ingredients: squid, dashi, rice

Ikameshi (烏賊飯; literally squid rice) is a Japanese dish of rice-filled squid. It is a regional dish from the Oshima area of Hokkaidō.

== Preparation ==
Ikameshi is prepared by removing tentacles from and gutting the squid, which is then stuffed with washed rice and cooked in dashi. Toothpicks and other such items may be used to keep the rice in place. The rice itself is usually a blend of both glutinous and non-glutinous rice. Other ingredients sometimes used as stuffing include minced squid tentacles, bamboo shoots, carrots and aburaage.

== History ==
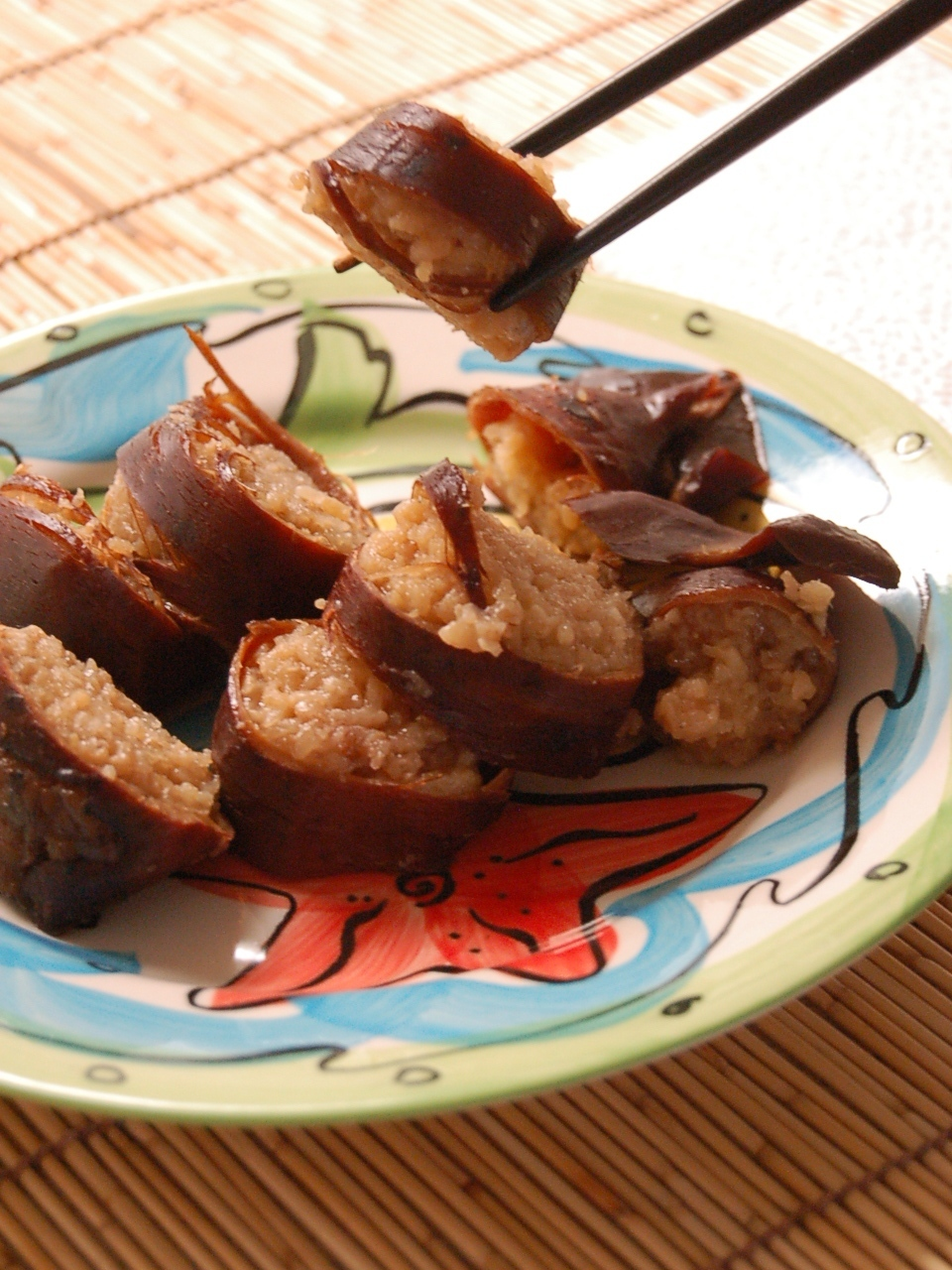
Ikameshi

In 1941 during World War II when food rations had a shortage of rice, Mori Station ekiben vendor Abeshoten (now Ikameshi Abeshoten) decided to use the plentiful Japanese flying squid that were being caught at the time as a way to ration the supply of rice.

After the war, in 1966, Keio Department Store held their first annual "Famous Novel Ekiben and National Delicacies Competition" (元祖有名駅弁と全国うまいもの大会, Ganso Yūmē Ekiben to Zenkoku Umaimono Taikai), for which Abeshoten entered their ikameshi dish. By the second competition, sales of ikameshi reached the number one ranking and became a regular entry in subsequent years. This gradually made it known nationally as a Mori delicacy and a Hokkaidō delicacy in general.

In recent years, other manufacturers of ikameshi other than Abeshoten have cropped up, and it is now possible to easily obtain it packaged and preserved by such means as special events and mail-order. Even in Honshū, it is sold at many stations where squid are caught nearby.

== See also ==
- List of seafood dishes
- Stuffed squid
