= Masuzushi =

Type of sushi from Toyama

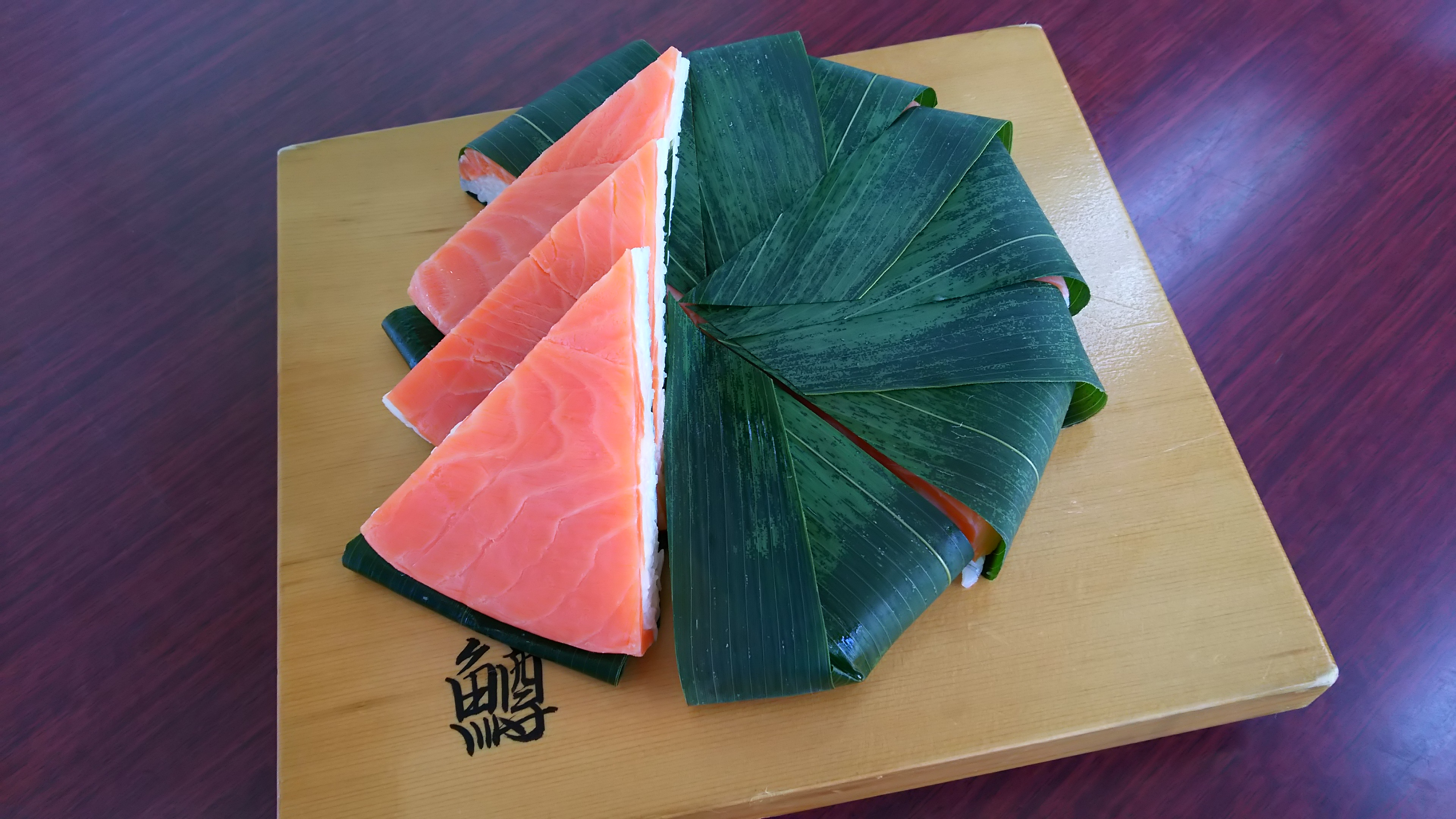
- Masuzushi, pressed sushi with trout
- Course: Main
- Main ingredients: Rice, umeboshi, fish, meat, tsukemono

Masuzushi (鱒寿司, literally 'trout sushi') is a kind of Japanese ekiben boxed meal sold on trains and train stations in Japan. It is a type of oshizushi (pressed sushi) and a well-known souvenir of Toyama.

Masuzushi is made of vinegared trout sashimi on top of vinegared rice and wrapped in bamboo leaves. Once the fish and rice is wrapped in bamboo leaves, a weight (often a heavy stone) is kept on top for several hours in order to compress and complete the dish. It is traditionally kept in a round bentwood box known as a mage-wappa, which is then sealed by two bamboo sticks. There are also masuzushi which consist of two layers of fish and rice.

== History ==
Masuzushi originated in the Edo period, with its preparation and storage technique remaining relatively the same as when it was first made.

Masuzushi was originally prepared by samurai Yoshimura Shinpachi for Maeda Toshioki, third lord of Toyama. It was then presented to Tokugawa Yoshimune.

It was during the Taishō era that masuzushi was first marketed as ekiben at the opening of the Hokuriku Railroad, popularizing it in other areas of Japan.

Masuzushi is most often eaten on special occasions such as Obon and New Year's in Japan.

== Gallery ==
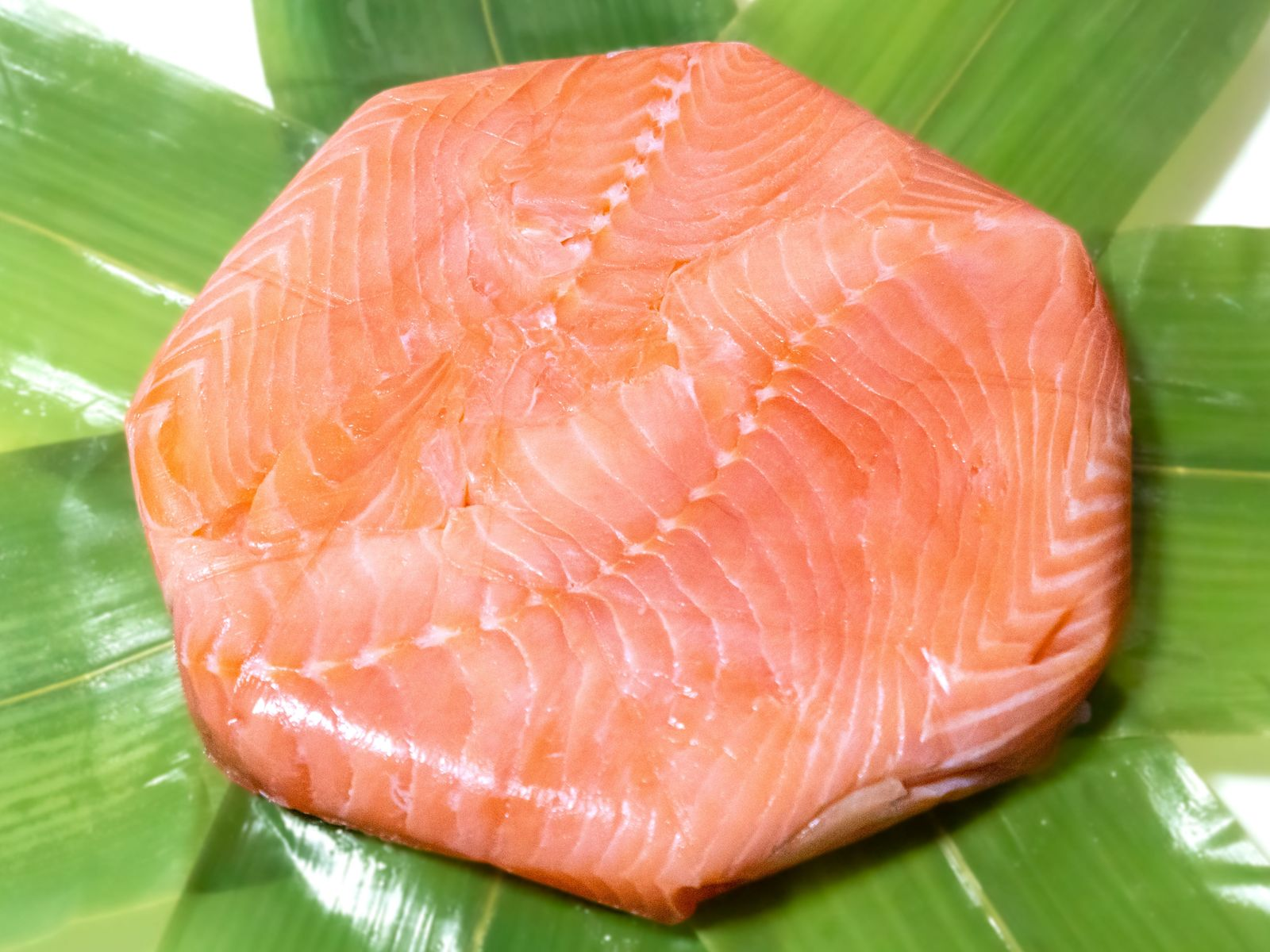

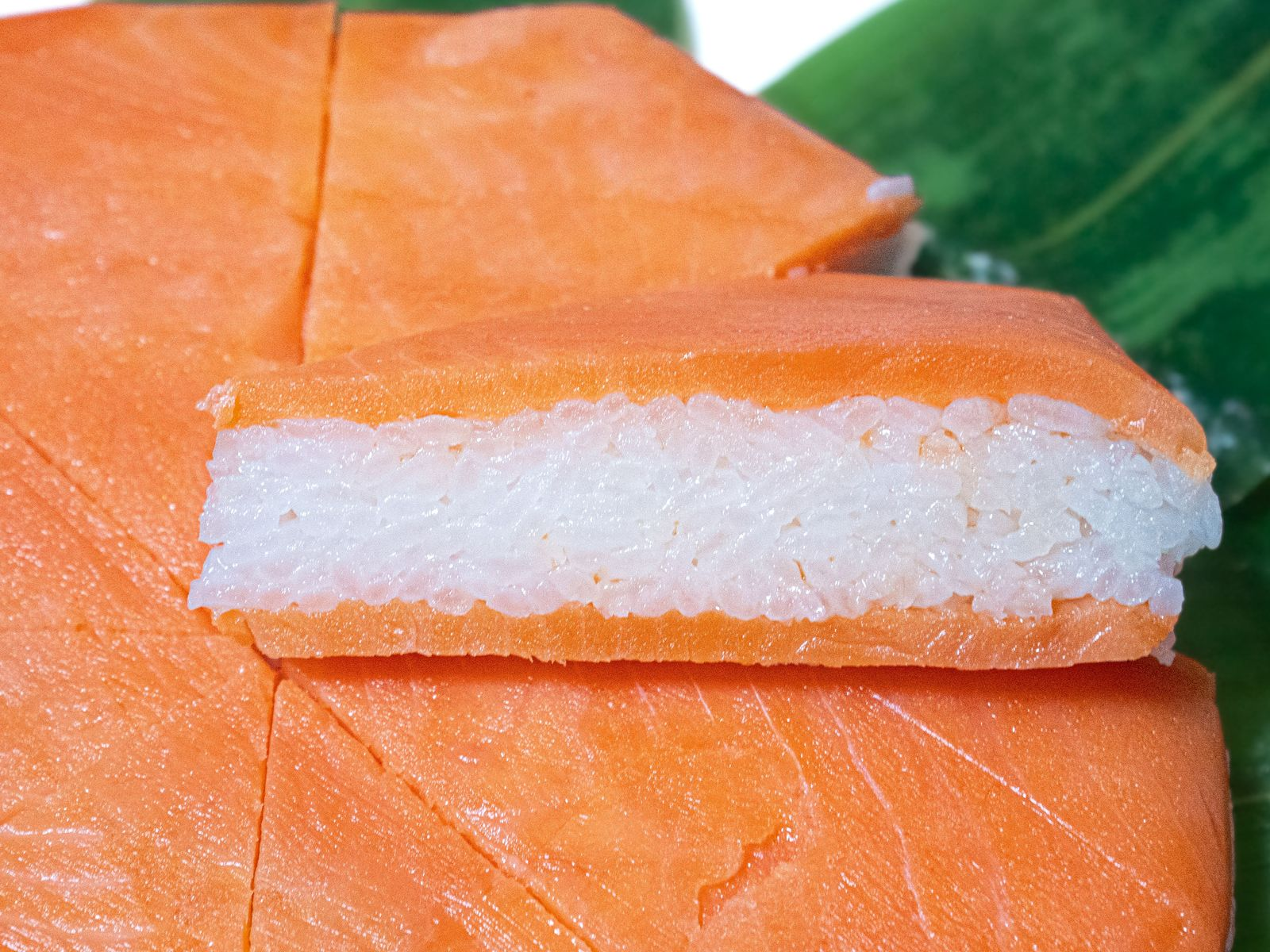

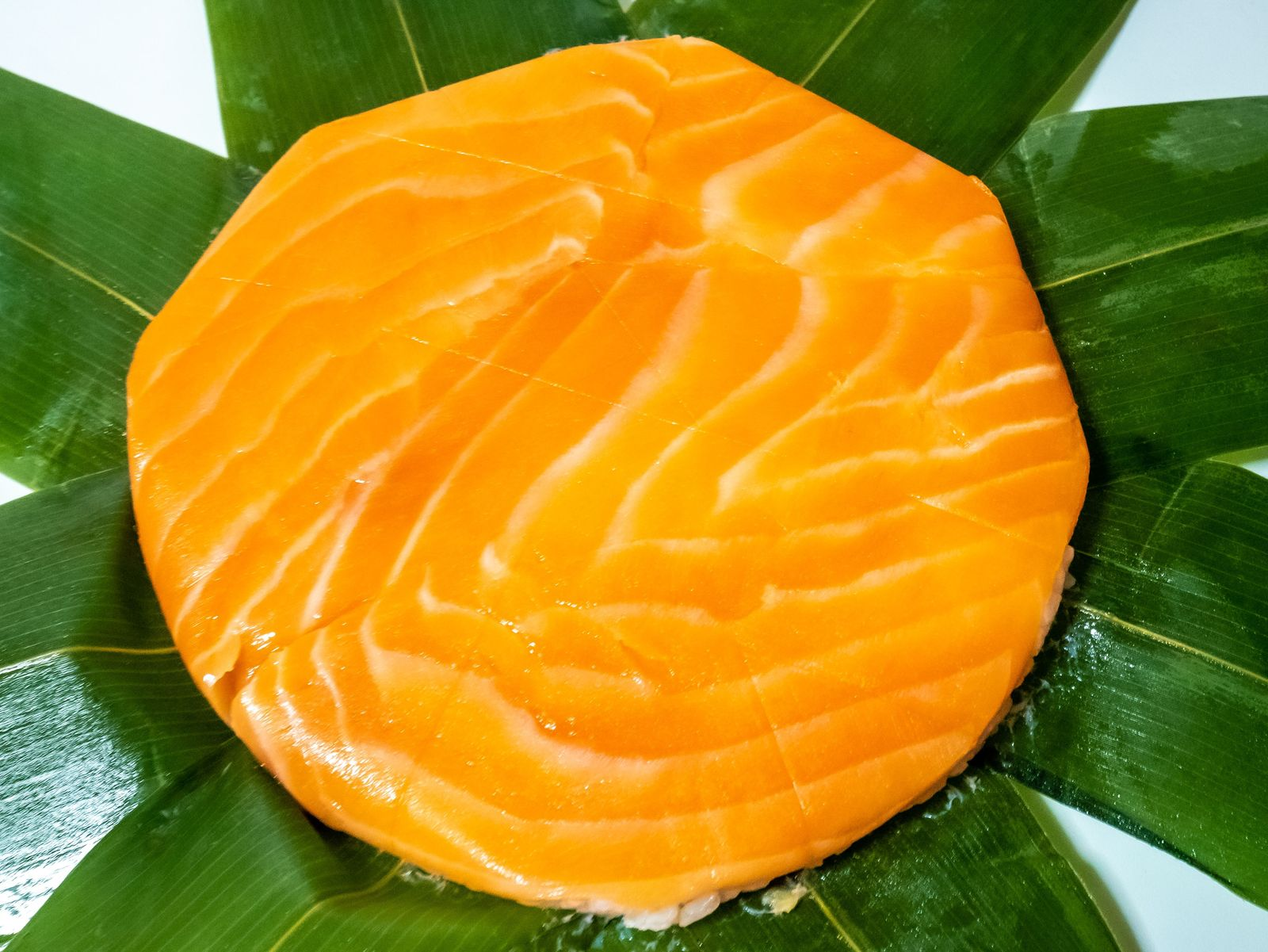

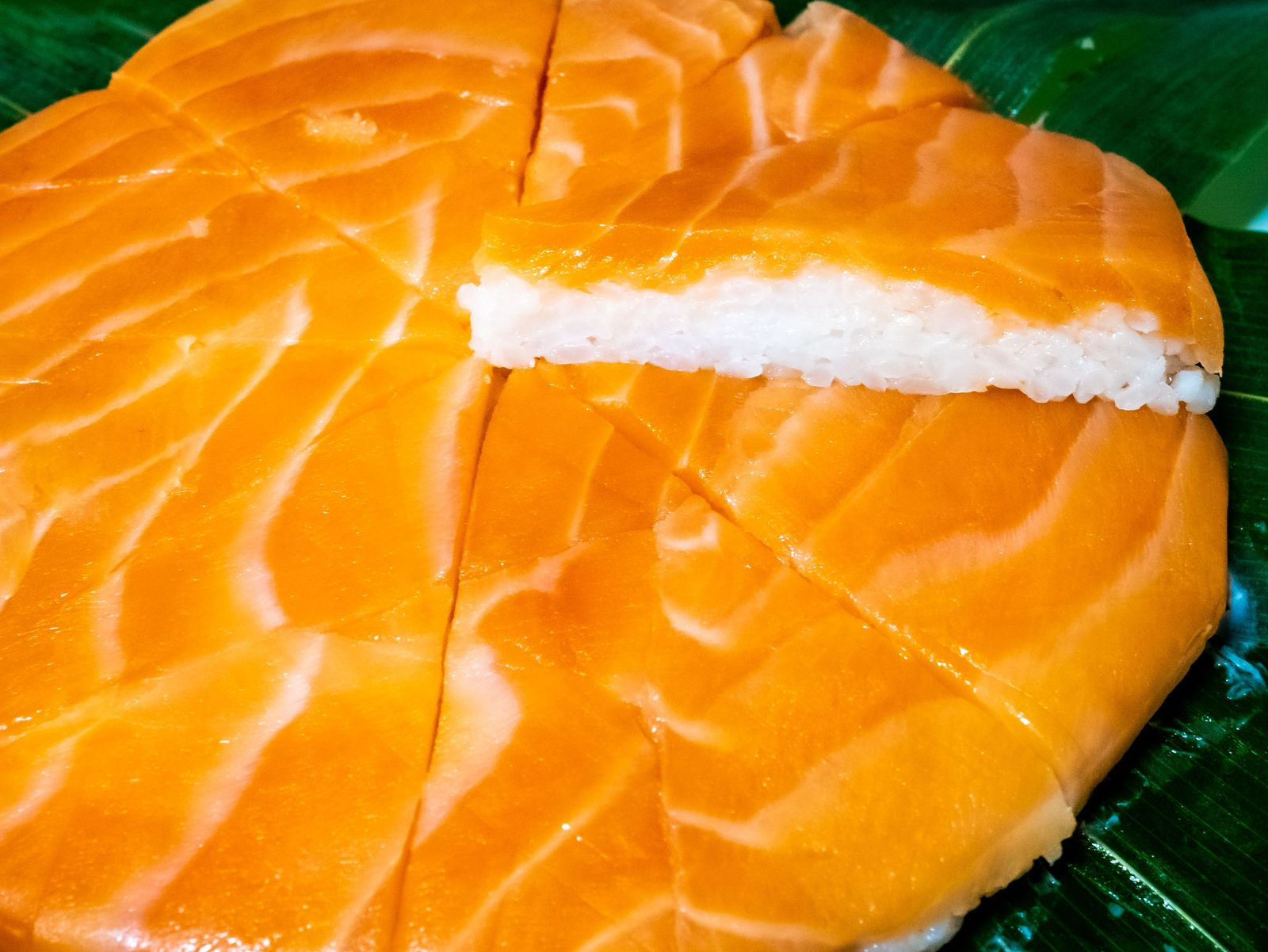

== See also ==
- Japanese regional cuisine
- Toyama Station
- Ekiben
