= Makunouchi =

Type of bento box for Japanese meal

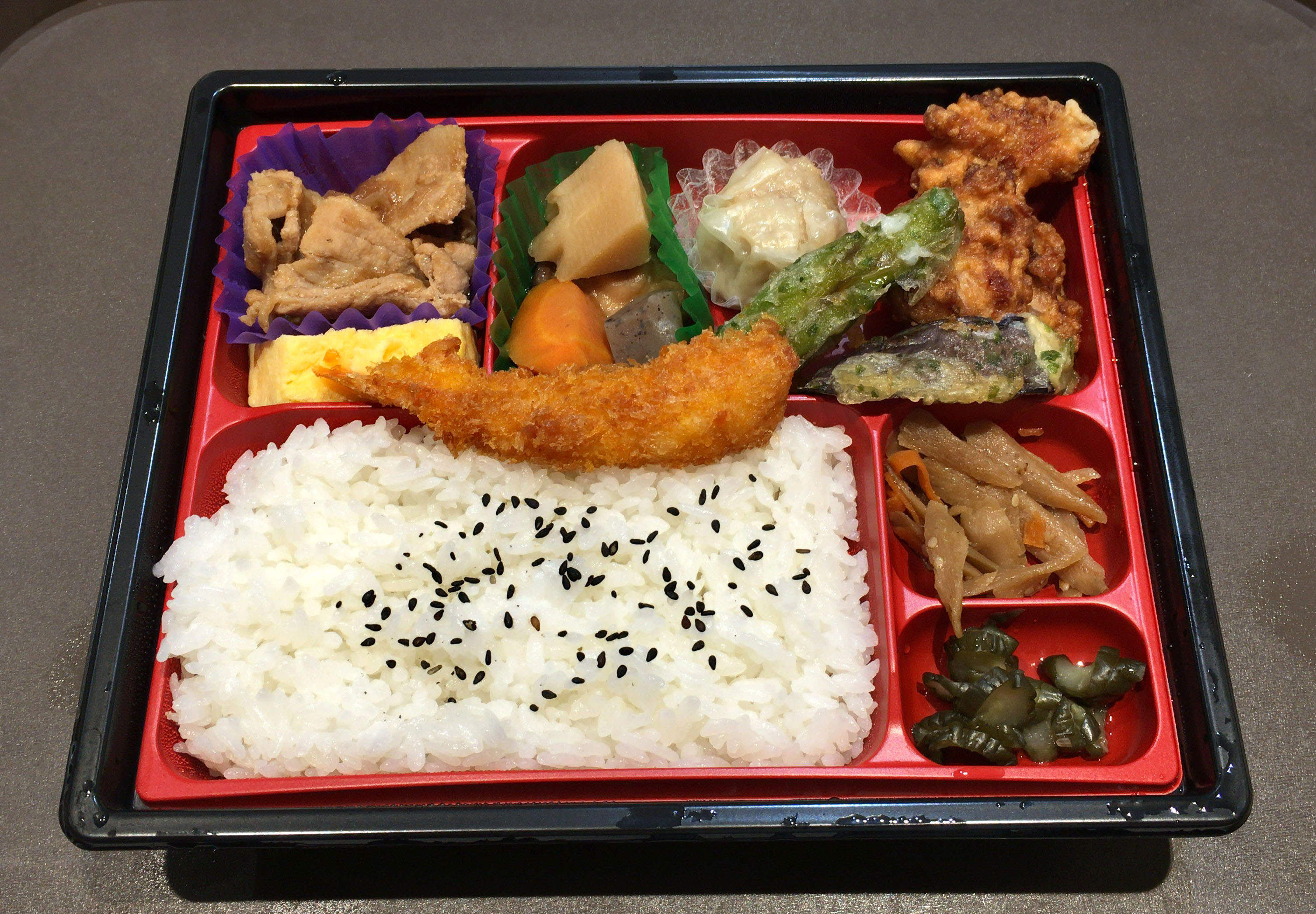
- A makunouchi bento
- Course: Main
- Main ingredients: Rice, umeboshi, fish, meat, tsukemono

Makunouchi (幕の内; lit. "between acts") is a popular type of Japanese bento which consists of mostly rice along with fish, meat, pickles, eggs, vegetables, and an umeboshi (a salt pickled plum). There are also other kinds of food such as a chestnut-rice, sweetfish sushi, and meat-and-rice-casserole forms.

== Etymology ==
The term makunouchi bentō, dates back to the Edo period (1603 to 1867), when they were sold to theater-goers during the intermissions (幕間, makuai) of Noh and kabuki theater performances.

From the Meiji period onward, makunouchi has become a common convention for bento boxes called ekiben sold at train stations. Convenience stores also sell a bento under the makunouchi name. Though the selection and number of items in a makunouchi bento vary between stores, it often contains more items and costs more than other bento.

== Gallery ==
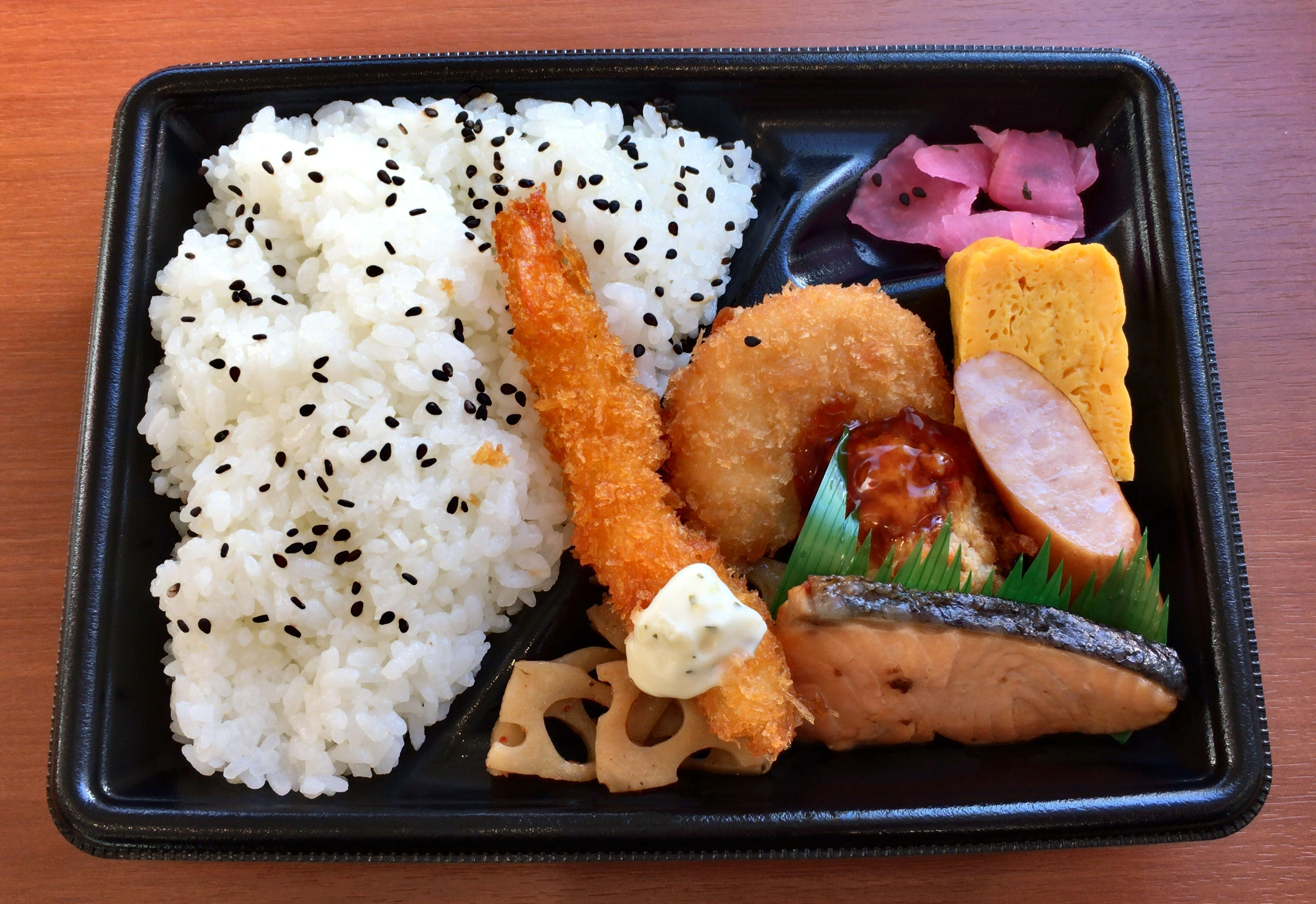
With ebi furai

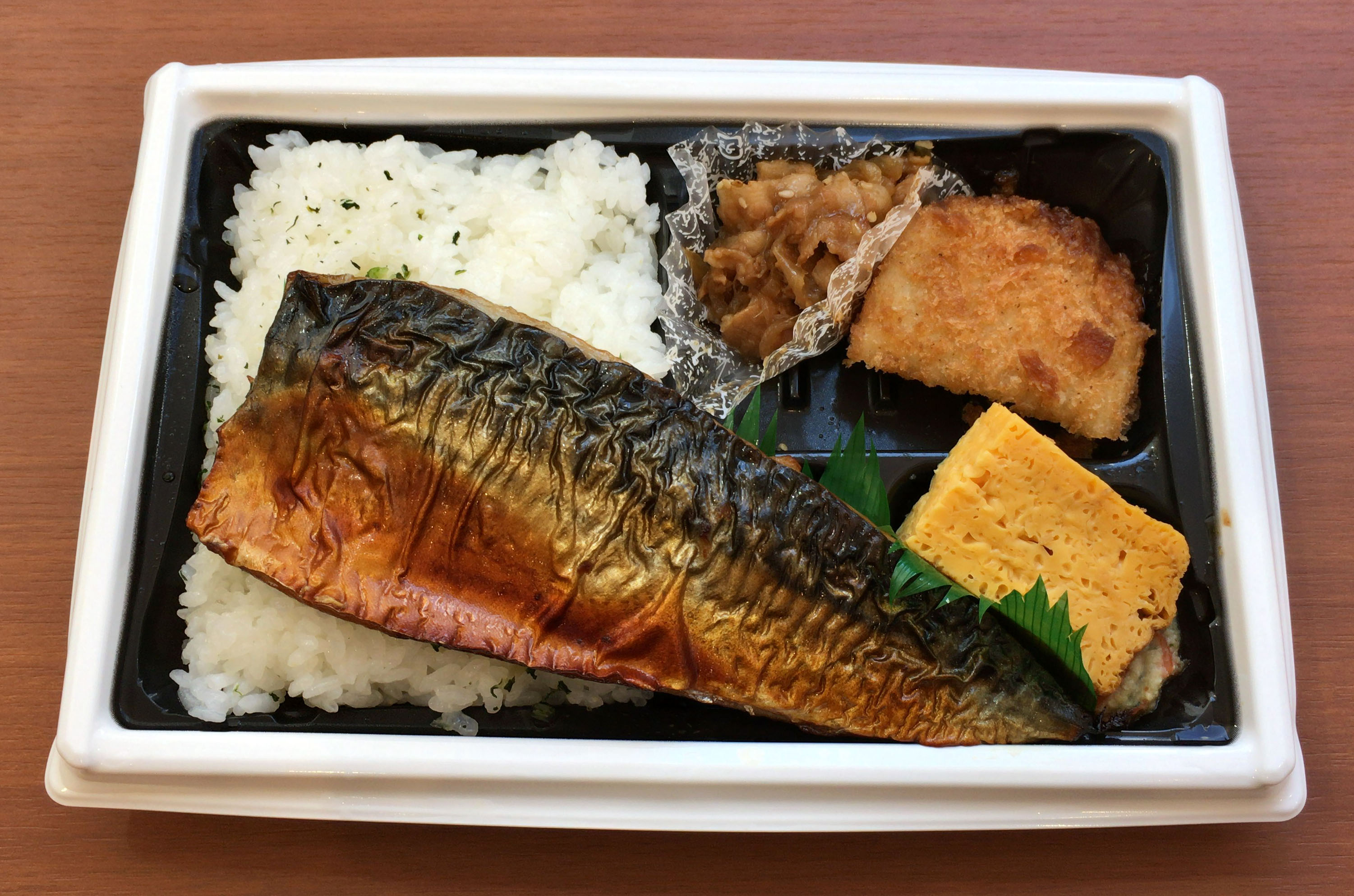
With grilled saba

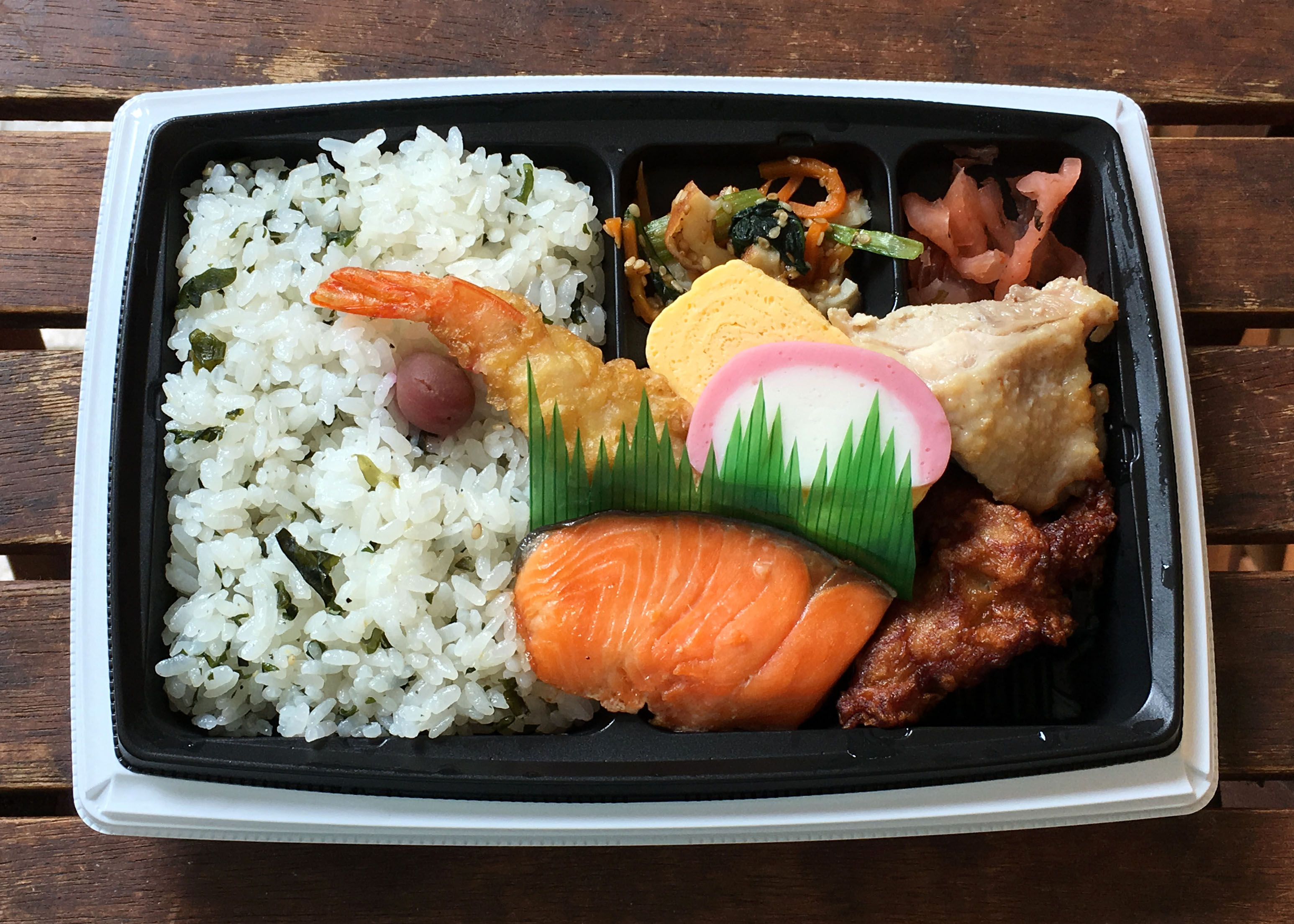
With salmon and karaage

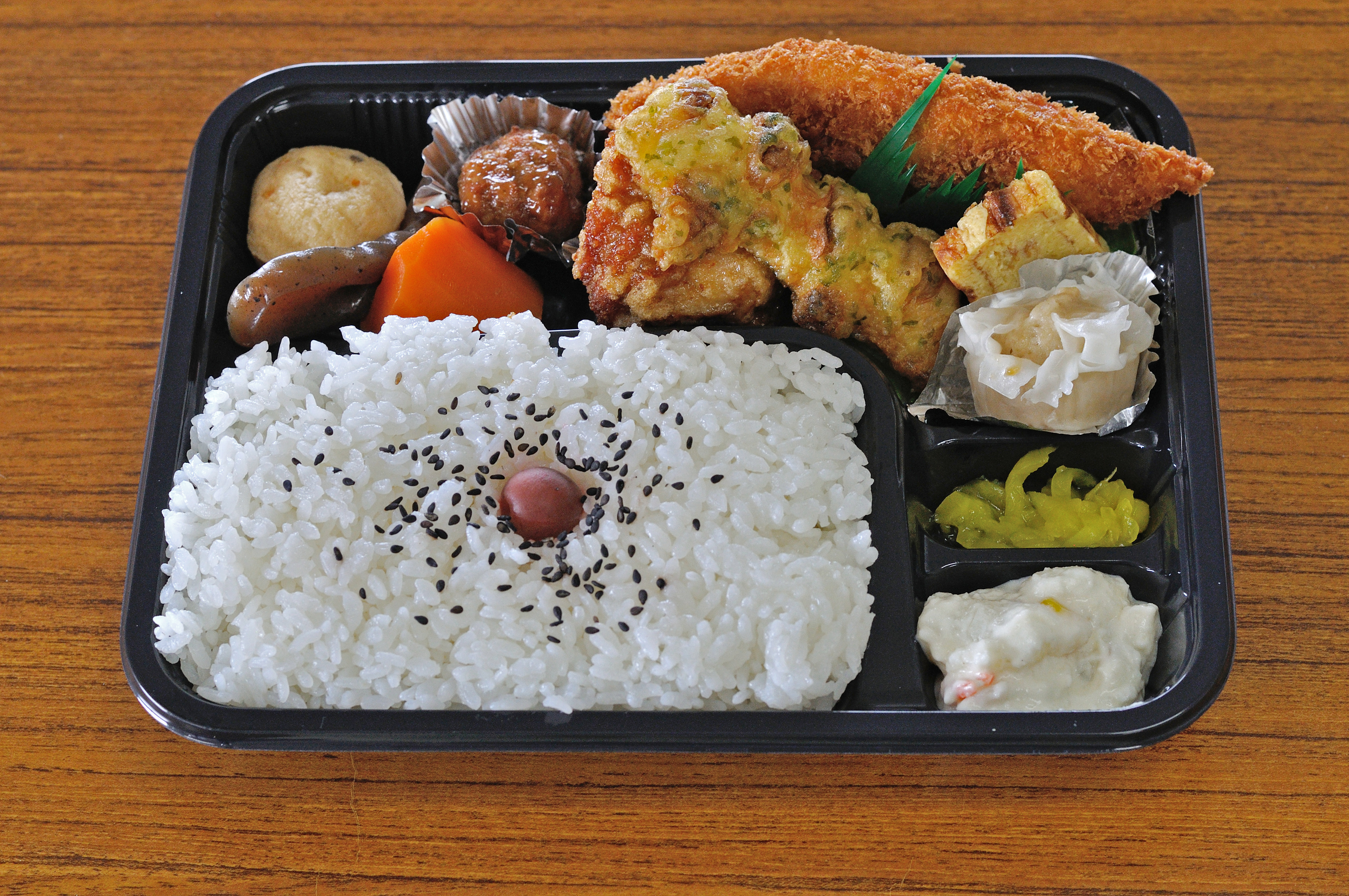
With umeboshi (center)

== See also ==
- Ekiben
- Kyaraben
- TV dinner, American equivalent
