= Bento Monogatari =

- Directed by: Pieter Dirkx
- Written by: Pieter Dirkx
- Starring: Bea Duchateau; Dirk Lavrysen; Bram Van Outryve
- Cinematography: Benjamin Lauwers
- Edited by: Pieter Dirkx
- Music by: Pieter Dirkx; Eli Dirkx
- Release date: November 17, 2010
- Running time: 27 minutes
- Country: Belgium
- Languages: Dutch; Japanese; English

Bento Monogatari (often translated as 'Lunchbox Story') is a 2010 short film by Pieter Dirkx. It was selected for the 2011 Cannes Film Festival in the Cinéfondation section. The film was the director's graduation project at the Hogeschool Sint-Lukas Brussels film school.

== Plot ==
A woman tries to put some new life into her failed marriage by delving into the world of Japanese pop-culture. Every morning, she prepares a cute Japanese lunchbox (bento) for her husband, Frank, who works in the waste collection center. Frank is more interested in his beautiful, young, male colleague and secretly throws his lunchbox away before anyone sees it.

== Cast ==
- Bea Duchateau as Yvonne
- Dirk Lavrysen as Frank
- Bram Van Outryve as Gunther
- Sae Nozawa as PEN

== See also ==
- Cinéfondation
- Cannes Film Festival
