= Mari Miyazawa =

Japanese bento artist and animator

Mari Miyazawa (宮澤真理, Miyazawa Mari) is a Japanese bento artist (food artist) and stop-motion animator based in Japan.

== Career ==
Miyazawa graduated from the Department of Fine Arts, College of Art, Nihon University in 1983, and worked in computer game graphics production until 2000. She began creating decorative "picture bento" (oekaki-bento) around 2002 and gained a wide online following through her website, e-obento.com. She later expanded her work beyond bento to lunch plates and confectionery and began producing stop-motion animation using food ingredients. She studied in the animation course at the Graduate School of Film and New Media, Tokyo University of the Arts, which she entered in 2012 and completed in March 2014. She is a member of the Japan Animation Association.

In February 2008, Miyazawa served as a judge and gave a bento-decorating demonstration at the Philippines' first bento contest, held in Manila.

== Animation ==
Miyazawa's graduation work at Tokyo University of the Arts was Decorations (2014), a stop-motion film created using real confectionery. The film received a Jury Selection in the Animation Division of the 18th Japan Media Arts Festival, and won awards including the Children's Jury 1st Prize at the 31st Chicago International Children's Film Festival, the Grand Prix at the 32nd Blue Wing Awards (Aoi Tsubasa Taishō), the Short Animation Grand Prix at the 8th TOHO Cinemas Student Film Festival, and the Best Animated Short Film award at the 2015 TIFF Kids International Film Festival in Toronto.

Starting in 2014, her stop-motion series Konigiri-kun (こにぎりくん), featuring a rice-ball character based on her bento art, began airing on NHK Educational TV. The series received international recognition, including the Grand Prix in the Preschool animation category for "Konigiri-Kun Music Box" at the 2018 Ottawa International Animation Festival. Individual entries in the series have also been recognized at festivals in Japan and abroad: "Konigiri-kun Undokai" (also known as "Konigiri-kun Kitchen Sports Day") received an Honorable Mention in the Preschool category at the Ottawa International Animation Festival in 2017, and "Konigiri-kun Concert" received a Special Mention in the same category in 2021. Her 2021 film "Konigiri-Kun Parasol" was selected for the Young Audiences competition at the 2022 Ottawa International Animation Festival, and was screened in the Elements+3 section of the Official Competition at the 2022 Giffoni Film Festival. In Japan, the entry "Konigiri-kun: Tsunagatteru?" won the Japanese Works Short Film Grand Prize at the 32nd Kineko International Film Festival in 2025.

Her 2019 stop-motion short Waltz (14 minutes) won the International Jury Japan Short Film Grand Prix at the 28th Kineko International Film Festival. Another short, Twins in Bakery, depicts a mysterious incident on a delivery route that becomes the secret behind a popular bakery's success. Her bento-themed animation work as a whole was also recognized with a Cool Japan Award in the "Character Bento" category in 2015.

== Lectures and workshops ==
In June 2016, as a related event of the Zagreb International Animation Festival (Animafest Zagreb), Miyazawa gave a talk and screening of her work at the Academy of Fine Arts, University of Zagreb, alongside fellow Japanese animators. During the same festival she also led a character-bento workshop, in which Aardman Animations' Peter Lord participated.

In May 2019, Miyazawa was invited by the Japan Foundation to give a talk titled "A Visual Feast – The Culinary Microcosm of the Japanese Lunch Box" at the Royal Society in London. As part of the same programme, she screened her work in the Trailblazers strand and led "Beautiful Bento" character-bento workshops for children and adults at the Flatpack Film Festival in Birmingham.

In November 2020, as a guest artist for the Miyazaki Prefectural Art Museum's "Traveling Museum: Waku Waku Art 2020", Miyazawa led animation workshops in Nobeoka and Misato, Miyazaki, and exhibited and screened her work in the museum's lobby.

In December 2023, she served as an instructor for a masterclass, "Making of My Film," at the MORC Stop Motion Animation Festival.

In October 2024, she gave a lecture in the "Comprehensive Expression Studies" course at the Faculty of Arts, Hiroshima City University.

She has also given ongoing character-bento demonstrations and talks at department stores in Japan, including Daimaru Fukuoka Tenjin, Daimaru Shinsaibashi, and Hankyu Umeda.

== Publications ==
Miyazawa has authored a series of picture books featuring her Konigiri-kun character, published by Froebel-kan, including Konigiri-kun no Okaimono (March 2018). She has also published several bento and recipe books in Japan.

== Filmography ==
- Decorations (2014) – Jury Selection at the 18th Japan Media Arts Festival; Children's Jury 1st Prize at the 31st Chicago International Children's Film Festival; Grand Prix at the 32nd Blue Wing Awards (Aoi Tsubasa Taishō); Short Animation Grand Prix at the 8th TOHO Cinemas Student Film Festival; Best Animated Short Film award at TIFF Kids International Film Festival (2015)
- Konigiri-kun (こにぎりくん) series (2014–present)
  - "Konigiri-kun Undokai" (2017) – Honorable Mention in the Preschool category at Ottawa International Animation Festival
  - "Konigiri-Kun Music Box" (2018) – Grand Prix in the Preschool category at Ottawa International Animation Festival
  - "Konigiri-kun Concert" (2021) – Special Mention in the Preschool category at Ottawa International Animation Festival
  - "Konigiri-Kun Parasol" (2021) – Selected for Young Audiences competition at Ottawa International Animation Festival; screened at Giffoni Film Festival
  - "Konigiri-kun: Tsunagatteru?" – Japanese Works Short Film Grand Prize at the 32nd Kineko International Film Festival (2025)
- Waltz (2019) – International Jury Japan Short Film Grand Prix at Kineko International Film Festival
- Twins in Bakery – screened by THEATRE for ALL
