= Pieter Dirkx =

Belgian film director and painter

- Born: 24 February 1984 (age 42); Antwerp, Belgium
- Occupations: Film director Screenwriter; Composer
- Years active: 2009 - present

Pieter Dirkx (born 24 February 1984) is a Belgian film director and painter. His short film Bento Monogatari premiered in the Cinéfondation program at the 2011 Cannes Film Festival. Dirkx was nominated for the Cinefondation Award at the same festival that year. He is also known for his production of The Geometry of Beetles (2009).

== Biography ==
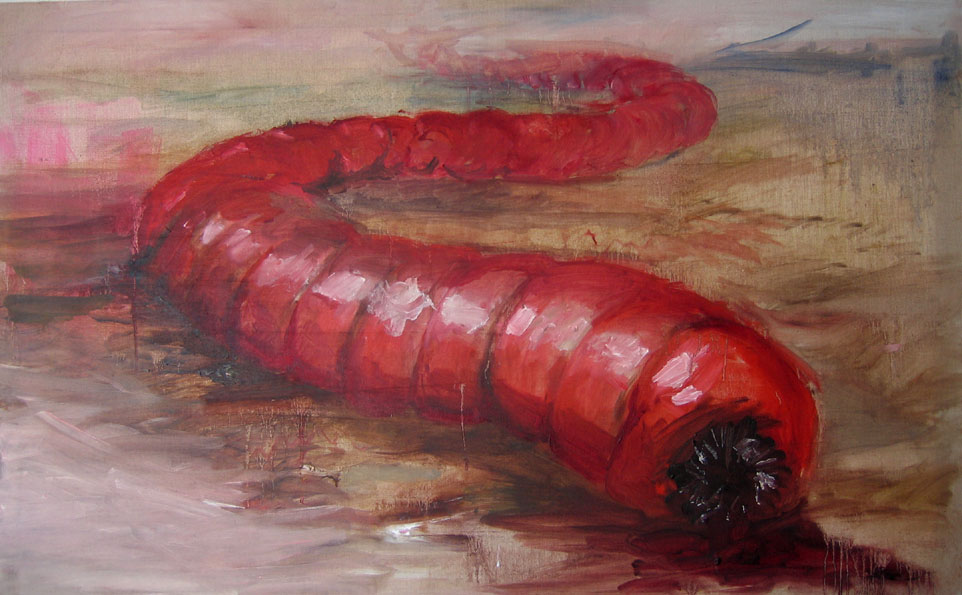
An interpretation of the Mongolian Death Worm by Dirkx.

Pieter Dirkx first studied painting at the Royal Academy of Fine Arts in Antwerp before starting film studies at Sint-Lukas Brussels. His first short in film school was ‘The Geometry of Beetles’, about a lonely man who considers his framed insects to be his only friends.

For his graduation project, Dirkx made ‘Bento Monogatari‘. It tells the story of Yvonne, a woman whose marriage has lost its spark. She attempts to regain her husband's attention by dragging him into the world of Japanese pop culture.

The film was first screened at ‘Het Grote Ongeduld!’, a showcase for Belgian film school graduates, where it won the CANVAS award (Belgian cultural television station) and the SCAM/SACD Audience Award. ‘Bento Monogatari’ was eventually selected for the Cannes Film Festival 2011 in the Cinéfondation programme. Other festival selections include the Hamburg Short Film Festival, Montreal World Film Festival, Brussels Film Festival, and Emir Kusturica's Küstendorf Film and Music Festival.

In 2011, Pieter Dirkx directed the music video for Clap Your Hands Say Yeah's single "Maniac".

== Short films ==
- The Geometry of Beetles (2009)
- Bento Monogatari (2010)

== Music videos ==
- Clap Your Hands Say Yeah - "Maniac" (2011)
- Deerhoof - "Breakup Songs" (2013)
