= Stuffed squid =

Food popular in Southern Europe and Northern Africa

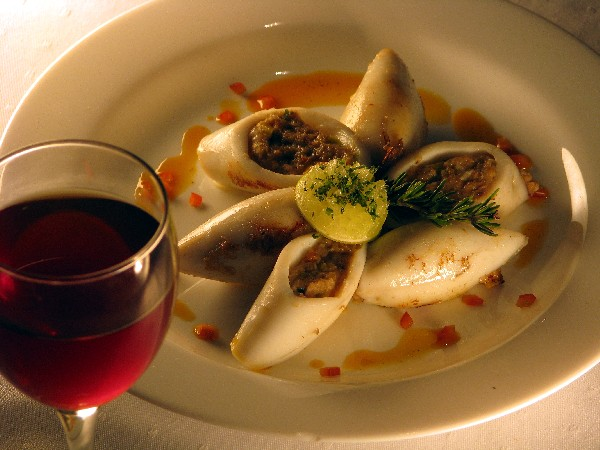
- Place of origin: Stuffed squid and red wine from The Flute in Mumbai
- Region or state: Greece, Italy, Portugal, Spain, Tunisia, Turkey
- Main ingredients: Squid

Stuffed squid (Note: Greek: Γεμιστό καλαμάρι/Καλαμάρι γεμιστό (yemisto kalamari/kalimari yemisto) Italian: Calamari ripieni Portuguese: Lula recheada Spanish: Calamares rellenos Tunisian: كلامار محشي (kalamar mihshi) Turkish: Kalamar dolması) is a generic name for meals made of olive oil, Spanish onion, garlic, rice, tomatoes, salt, black pepper, mint leaves, parsley, squid and tomato juice. It is mostly popular in Greece, Italy, Portugal, Spain, Algeria, Tunisia, and Turkey.

Tunisian stuffed squid recipes are frequent, and diverse along the Coastal East of the country. They are eaten as a main course, either alone in a spicy harissa and tomato sauce or as part of a couscous dish.

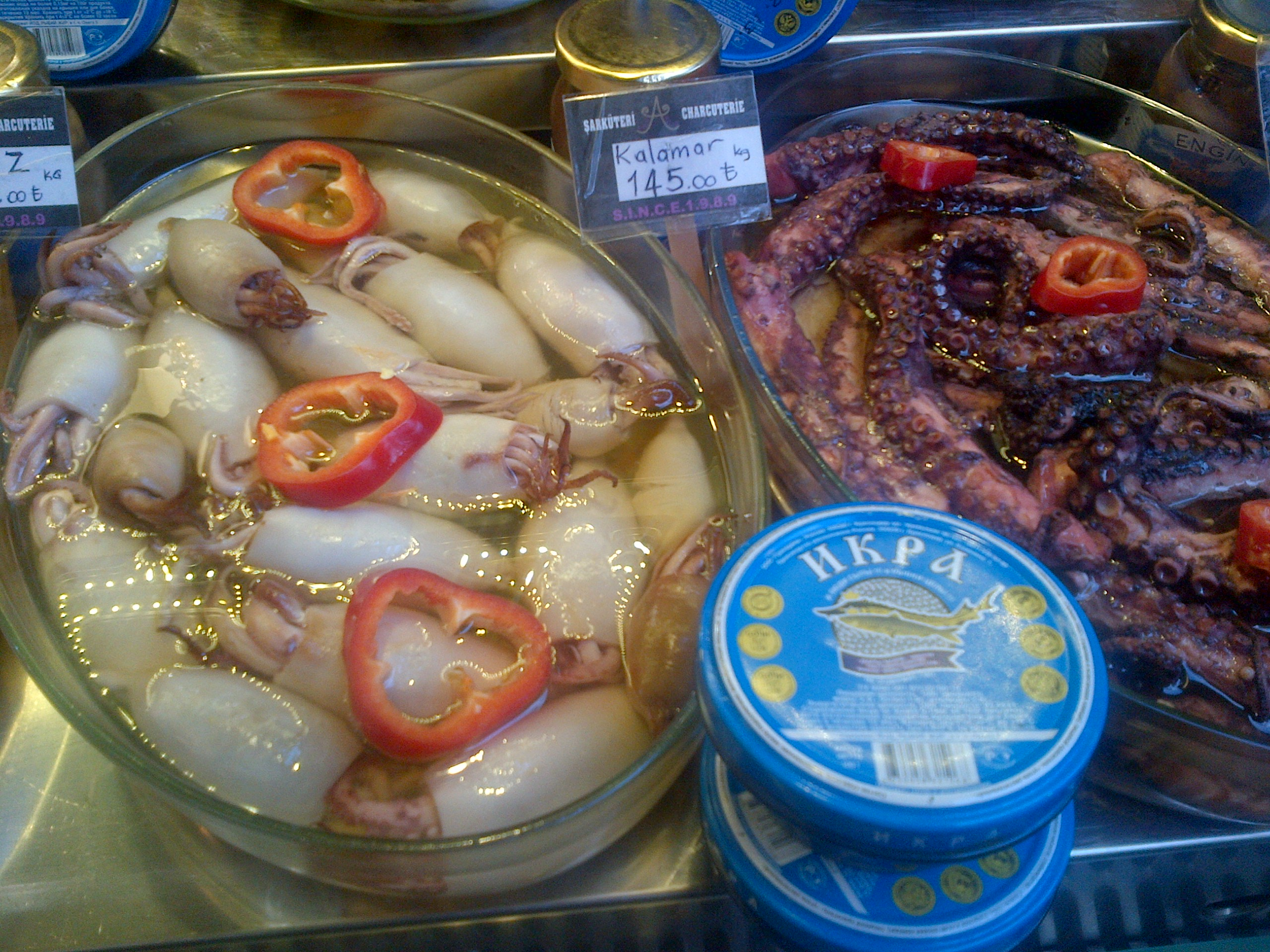
"Kalamar dolma", chipirones rellenos a la turca.

In the Central Sahel region (Sousse, Monastir and Mahdia), the stuffing main ingredients are greens such as chard or spinach, often mixed with generous quantities of fresh parsley and chopped onions. To the greens are added a small quantity of either rice, bulgur, barley semolina or precooked chickpeas and a protein element which can be either hard-boiled eggs and the squids' tentacles finely chopped, or a mix of the tentacles, sheep liver and other sheep offal, and raw eggs to gather together the stuffing. The stuffing is flavored with harissa or spicy dry paprika and other spices such as garlic, dry mint or powdered fennel or a coriander and caraway mixture.

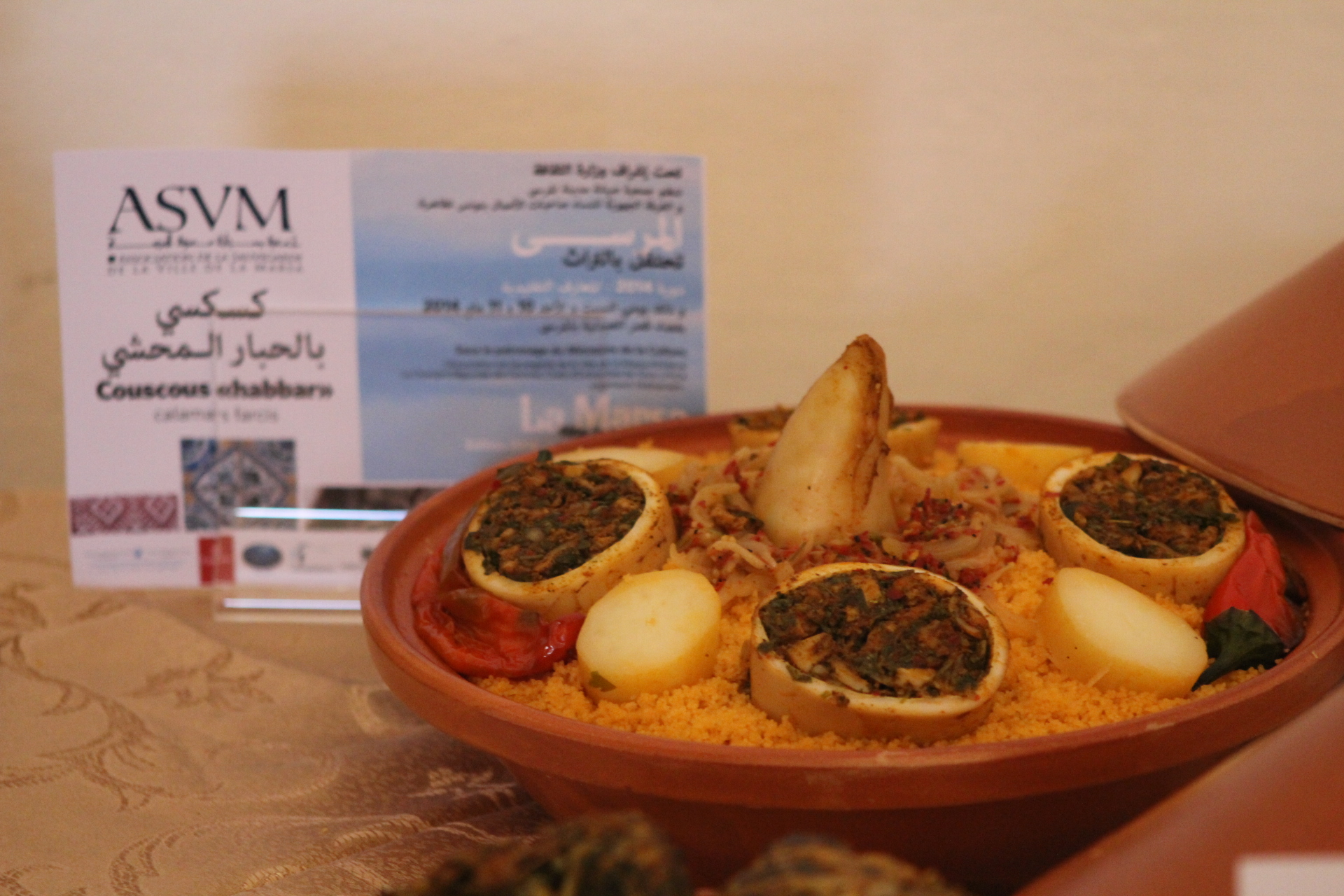
Tunisian couscous with stuffed calamari

In the southern part of the Tunisian coast, in the Gabès region, the stuffing tends to use less or no greens, but uses as main ingredients the chopped tentacles and pre-cooked chickpeas, to which are added carrots, onions, garlic, coriander and carraway seeds and instead of harissa, the regionally ubiquitous hrous (pickled onion and red pepper paste).

In Italy, in particular in Sardinia and Apulia, the stuffing is with tentacles, bread crumbs, garlic, and parsley.

== See also ==
- Ikameshi - In Hokkaido's food.
