= Top Gear challenges =

Segment of the Top Gear television programme

Top Gear challenges is a segment of the Top Gear television programme where the presenters are tasked by the producers, or each other, to prove or accomplish various tasks related to vehicles.

== Novelty/stunt challenges ==
The novelty challenges and short stunt films in the programme are typically based on absurd premises, such as jumping a bus over motorcycles (instead of the more typical scenario of a motorcycle jumping over buses), or a nun driving a monster truck. These features became less prominent over the course of the programme (they were much more regular during the first four series); they were superseded in later series by the "How hard can it be?" and Cheap car challenges, which are much larger in scope.

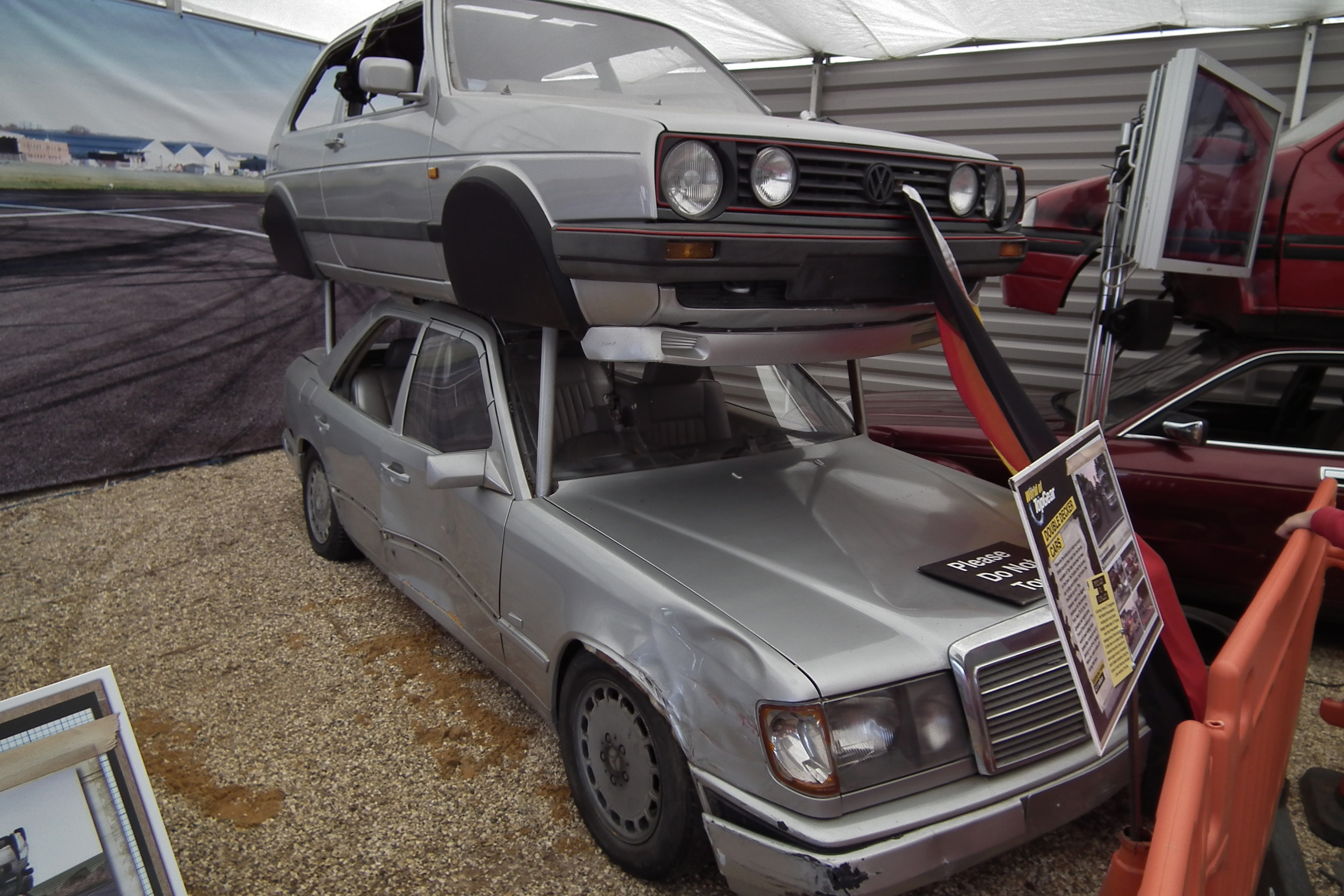

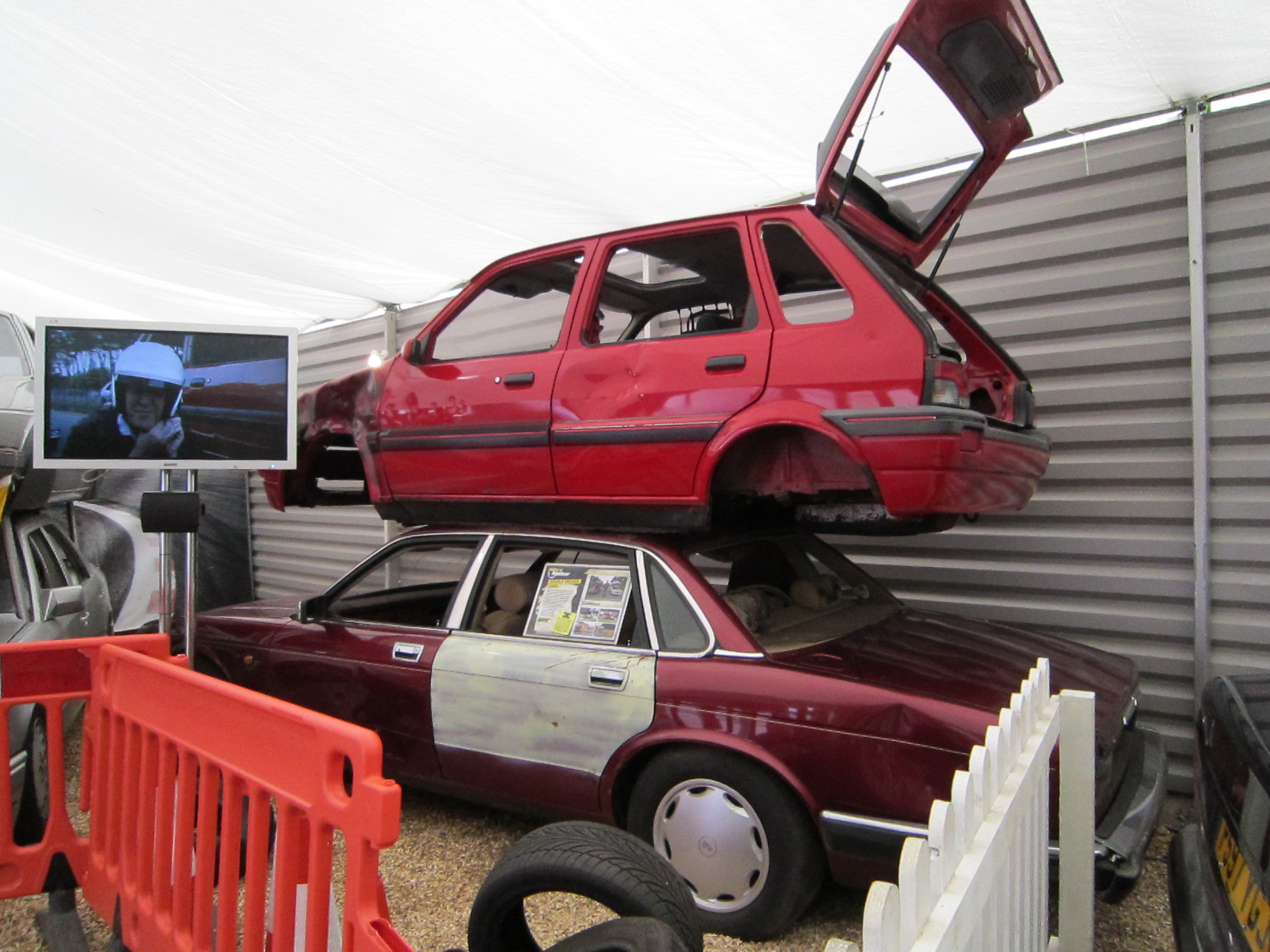
The modified double-decker cars used in the Top Gear vs Germany challenges

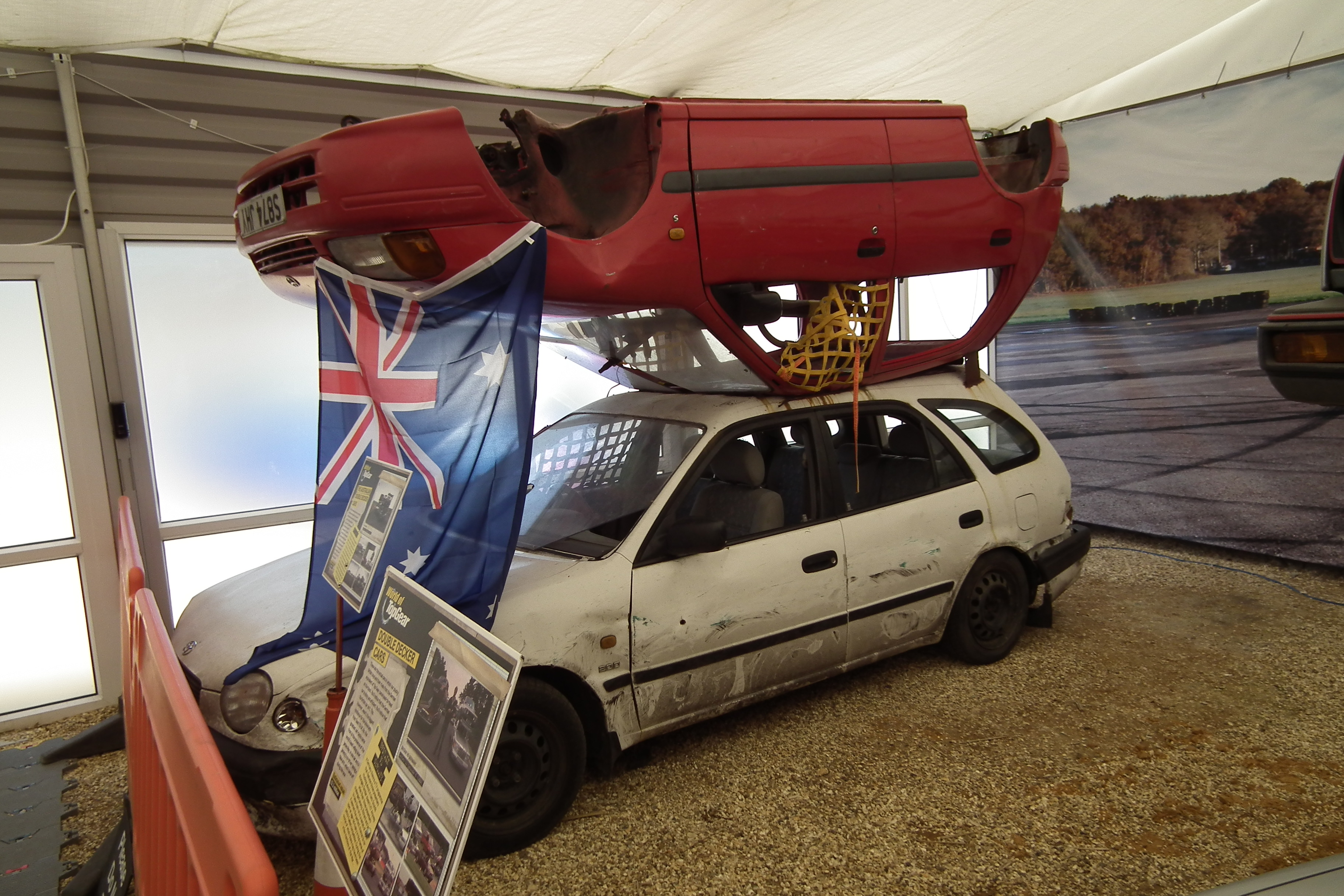
The modified double-decker Toyotas used by the Top Gear Australia presenters in The Ashes special

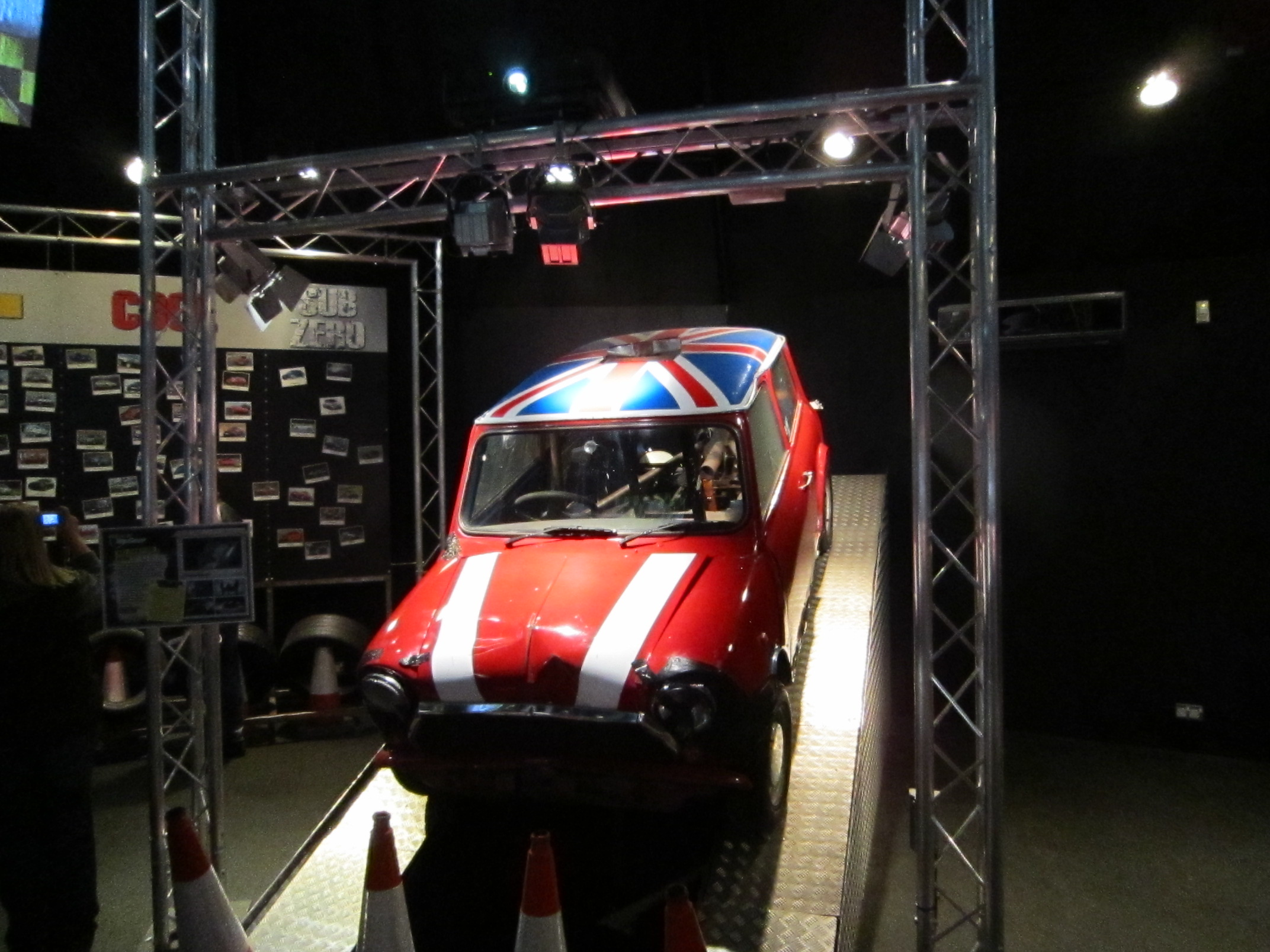
The 1986 Mini used in the ski-jump challenge

- How fast do you have to drive to be undetected by a speed camera? Series One, Episode One
- How many motorcycles can a double-decker bus jump over? Series One, Episode Two
- Can Grannies do doughnuts? Series One, Episode Three
- Can you make an 'average' car into a 007/Bond car, for less than £300? Series One, Episode Five
- Can Grannies do handbrake turns? Series One, Episode Six
- What is Britain's fastest faith? Series One, Episode Seven & Ten
- Who is Britain's fastest white van man? Series One, Episode Eight
- Lotus give a Lada Riva a £100,000 makeover Series One, Episode Eight
- How much faster will a car go if you strip it to save weight? Series One, Episode Nine
- What to do with the worst car of all time, the 1985 Nissan Sunny? Series Two, Episode One
- What is Britain's fastest political party? Series Two, Episode Two
- What country makes the fastest supercar? Series Two, Episode Three
- Can Ford's World Rally Championship pit team dismantle and rebuild a rally car faster than four women can get ready for a night out? Series Two, Episode Five
- May oversees an attempt at the land-speed record for a caravan Series Two, Episode Six
- A "race for the universe": Sci-Fi characters race around the Top Gear track Series Two, Episode Eight
- Can The Stig achieve 100 mph on the 200m runway of HMS Invincible? Series Three, Episode One
- How many caravans can a 1987 Volvo 240 jump over? Series Three, Episode Two
- What is the best wig for driving fast in an open top convertible? Series Three, Episode Five
- Which professor can do the best burn-out? Series Three, Episode Seven
- Can a car beat a train to the South of France? Series Four, Episode One
- Can a nun drive a monster truck? Series Four, Episode Two
- Hammond and May play darts using real cars Series Four, Episode Four
- Can a Ford Sportka beat a racing pigeon? Series Four, Episode Four
- Hammond makes fun of motorists that block yellow boxes Series Four, Episode Eight
- Is the jet from a 747 enough to blow a car over? Series Four, Episode Eight
- Can you parachute into a moving car? Series Four, Episode Nine
- Olympic Games for cars: Long Jump Series Four, Episode Ten
- How many bouncy castles can an ice cream van jump? Series Five, Episode One
- Hammond and May play conkers with caravans Series Five, Episode Four
- Historic People Carrier Racing Championship Series Five, Episode Five
- Can a stretch limo jump over a wedding party? Series Six, Episode Four
- Hammond oversees an attempt at the world record for the number of complete sideways rolls in a car Series Six, Episode Nine
- Hammond and May play with life-size radio control cars made from real cars Series Seven, Episode Two
- The Team try to get a 1986 Mini to beat a skier down a ski slope at Lillehammer Winter Olympic Special
- Hammond oversees an attempt by the Stig at the nonexistent indoor world speed record Series Eight, Episode Six
- Motorhome Racing Series Ten, Episode Six
- Hammond converts a G-Wiz into a full-sized remote-controlled car Series Ten, Episode Ten
- May oversees an attempt by Top Gear Stuntman at the nonexistent world record for car jumping in reverse Series Eleven, Episode One
- May oversees an attempt by Top Gear Stuntman to replicate a corkscrew car jump, as featured in The Man with the Golden Gun Series Eleven, Episode Two
- The Top Gear team (Britain) take on the hosts of D MOTOR (Germany) in a series of car challenges to decide the best motoring country Series Eleven, Episode Six
- Bus Racing Series Twelve, Episode Five
- Hammond oversees an attempt by Top Gear Stuntman to beat rival show Fifth Gear's distance record for jumping a car while towing a caravan Series Twelve, Episode Seven
- Clarkson plays British Bulldog with the British Army Series Thirteen, Episode Four
- Airport vehicle racing Series Fourteen, Episode Four
- Clarkson drives a 1994 Reliant Robin from Sheffield to Rotherham (constantly flipping over) Series Fifteen, Episode One
- Top Gear UK vs Top Gear Australia Series Sixteen, Episode Two
- World Taxi Racing Championship Series Twenty, Episode Two

== Challenge reviews ==
A common theme on Top Gear combines standard road tests and opinions with an unusual circumstance, or with a challenge to demonstrate a notable vehicle characteristic.

- Drive until you get bored/Test: enjoyable travel. Jeremy Clarkson claimed that Jaguars "ease the burden of travel" and devised a test for the Jaguar XJ to see how far he could drive one before he got bored. He ran out of country before he got bored. Series Two, Episode Four
- Lap of the M25/Test: fuel economy. Clarkson drove a lap of the M25 in a diesel Volkswagen Lupo, while another driver used the petrol version to see which would achieve greater fuel efficiency. Clarkson was allowed to spend money he saved over the petrol version on a gift at South Mimms services. He chose a small gold model of a cockerel, which reappeared in later series as "The Golden Cock"—the award given to the presenter who had made the most embarrassing mistake of the year. Series Three, Episode One
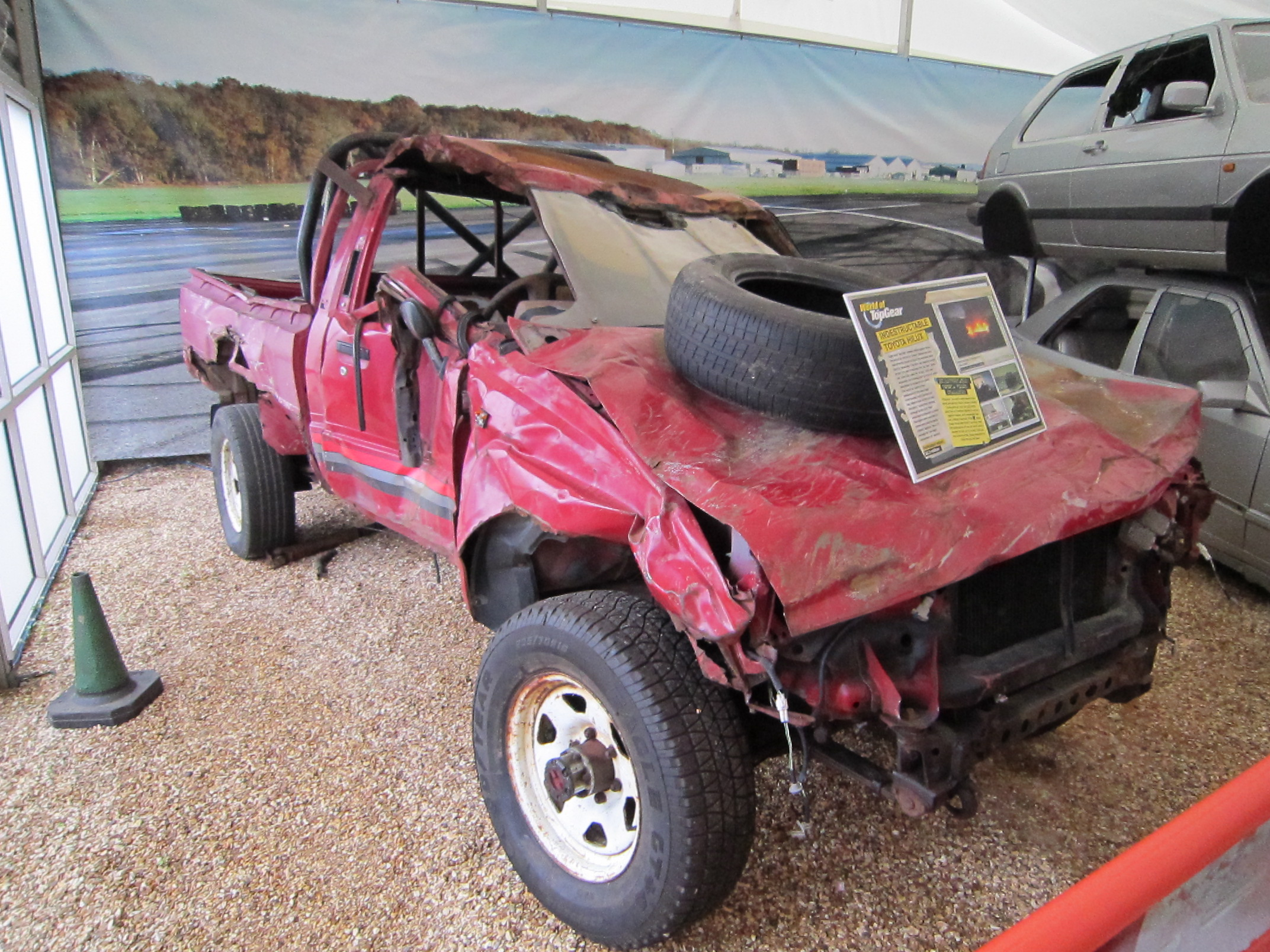
- The severely damaged Toyota Hilux used in the destruction test
  Toyota Hilux destruction/Test: toughness. Clarkson and James May used various methods in an attempt to destroy a 1988 Toyota Hilux, which included driving it into a tree that belonged to Churchill Parish, Somerset. The villagers presumed that the damage had been accidental or vandalism until the Top Gear episode was broadcast. After the BBC was contacted, the director of Top Gear admitted guilt and the broadcaster paid compensation. Other tests on the Hilux included leaving it in the ocean, slamming it with a wrecking ball, setting the cabin on fire and finally having it hoisted to the roof of a tower block that was subsequently blown up. The heavily damaged (but still driveable) Hilux used to stand on a plinth in the Top Gear studio from 2004 to 2016. Series Three, Episodes Five & Six
- Helicopter gunship evasion/Test: handling. Clarkson tried to avoid being caught in missile lock from a Westland WAH-64D Apache attack helicopter while driving a Lotus Exige. Series Four, Episode One
- London to Edinburgh and back again on a single tank of fuel/Test: fuel economy. Clarkson attempted to drive a 4.0 V8 diesel Audi A8 800 miles (1,300 km) on a single tank of fuel. Series Four, Episode Four
- Minicab road testing/Test: toughness and practicality. Richard Hammond and May worked as minicab drivers in order to subject a Renault Scenic and Ford C-MAX to a year's worth of hard abuse in one evening. Series Four, Episode Seven
- Off-road up a mountain/Test: off-road ability. Clarkson tried to drive a Land Rover Discovery from the beach to the top of Cnoc an Fhreiceadain in Scotland, completely off-road. It was heavily criticised by environmentalists for the damage done by the vehicle's tyres. Clarkson left the mountain by helicopter with the Discovery's keys in his pocket, which caused a delay in its removal from the hill. Series Five, Episode Three
- 24 hours in a car/Test: comfort. Hammond and May spent 24 hours in a Smart Forfour to assess the marketing claim that the car is "designed like a lounge." Series Five, Episode Four
- Tank evasion/Test: off-road ability. Clarkson investigated whether a Challenger 2 tank could lock its main cannon on to a Range Rover Sport. Series Six, Episode One
- Car Football/Test: toughness and handling. Hammond and May, along with a selection of professional drivers, played a football match using Toyota Aygos. Series Six, Episode One
- Sniper evasion/Test: handling. Clarkson drove around a deserted village (British Army training facility at STANTA, Norfolk) in a Mercedes-Benz SLK55 AMG and a 2005 Porsche Boxster S, trying to evade snipers of the Irish Guards. Series Six, Episode Five
- Road Test Russian Roulette/Test: random road testing. Hammond and May worked as ScooterMen in order to road test as many randomly selected cars as possible. They did not know what they would be road-testing and they had to do it in the presence of the cars' owners. Series Six, Episode Nine
- Supercars/Superbridge/Test: illustrate the point of supercars. The trio took three supercars (a Ford GT, a Ferrari F430 Spider and a Pagani Zonda S) on a road trip to the recently opened Millau Viaduct via Paris. Series Seven, Episode Three
- Car Ice Hockey/Test: toughness and handling. Hammond and May, along with a selection of professional drivers, played an ice hockey match using Suzuki Swifts, while Clarkson acted as referee. Winter Olympics Special
- Horse racing camera platform/Test: smooth ride. Clarkson reviewed the Citroën C6 and put it to work as a mobile camera platform covering a horse race. Series Eight, Episode Five
- Car Football 2/Test: toughness and handling. Hammond and May, along with a selection of professional drivers, staged another football match using a Toyota Aygos against a new contender, the Volkswagen Fox. Series Eight, Episode Five
- VIP chauffeur/Test: luxury. In Japan, May road tested the Mitsuoka Orochi and Galue, and used the Galue to chauffeur a Sumo wrestler and his manager to a tournament as a way to test if the car is "Japan's Rolls-Royce." Series Eleven, Episode Six
- Best Hot Hatchback for doing various things in/Test: Fun and practicality. In order to determine which hot hatchback was the best, the trio were told to bring one to the Italian city of Lucca. Clarkson brought a Citroën DS3 Racing, May a 2010 Renaultsport Clio Cup and Hammond a 2011 Fiat 500 Abarth. Series Seventeen, Episode Two
- GT car on a WRC stage/Test: 4WD system. May takes a Bentley Continental GT to a Welsh stage of the World Rally Championship and acts as Kris Meeke's co-driver. Series Nineteen, Episode One
- Car and tablecloth/Test: Speed. The Stig tries to use a Nissan GT-R to pull a tablecloth off a table without smashing any of the ornaments and cutlery. Series Twenty-One, Episode Four

== How hard can it be? ==
A recurring feature in the programme involves the hosts undertaking a number of bizarre challenges involving cars. The segments involving the challenges are usually preceded by Clarkson, though sometimes Hammond or May, asking the audience and viewers: "How hard can it be?"

=== Lap the Nürburgring in less than 10 minutes... in a diesel ===
Series Five, Episode Five

Clarkson took a diesel Jaguar S-Type to the Nürburgring with the aim of completing a lap in less than 10 minutes. Clarkson was being coached by Sabine Schmitz, a noted German racer. After consecutive unsuccessful tries, Clarkson managed to lap the Nürburgring in 9 minutes and 59 seconds, with Clarkson celebrating enthusiastically and showing the results proudly to his coach. Schmitz was still unimpressed, proclaiming that she could do that time in a van, and then lapped the Jaguar 47 seconds faster than Clarkson's time.

=== Lap the Nürburgring in less than 9 minutes and 59 seconds... in a van ===
Series Six, Episode Seven

To celebrate the Ford Transit's 40th birthday, Hammond went to the Nürburgring to see if Clarkson's mentor from the previous Nürburgring challenge, Sabine Schmitz, could live up to her claim and do a lap in a diesel 2005 Ford Transit van in less than 9 minutes and 59 seconds. Despite minor aerodynamic modifications and weight-saving made to the van, including removal of the passenger seat, spare tyre, tools, windscreen wipers, and Hammond himself, and using a Dodge Viper driving in front allowing the Transit to slipstream behind it, Schmitz was unable to do a lap time of less than 10 minutes, achieving a lap time of 10 minutes and 8 seconds.

=== Convertible people carrier ===
Series Eight, Episode One

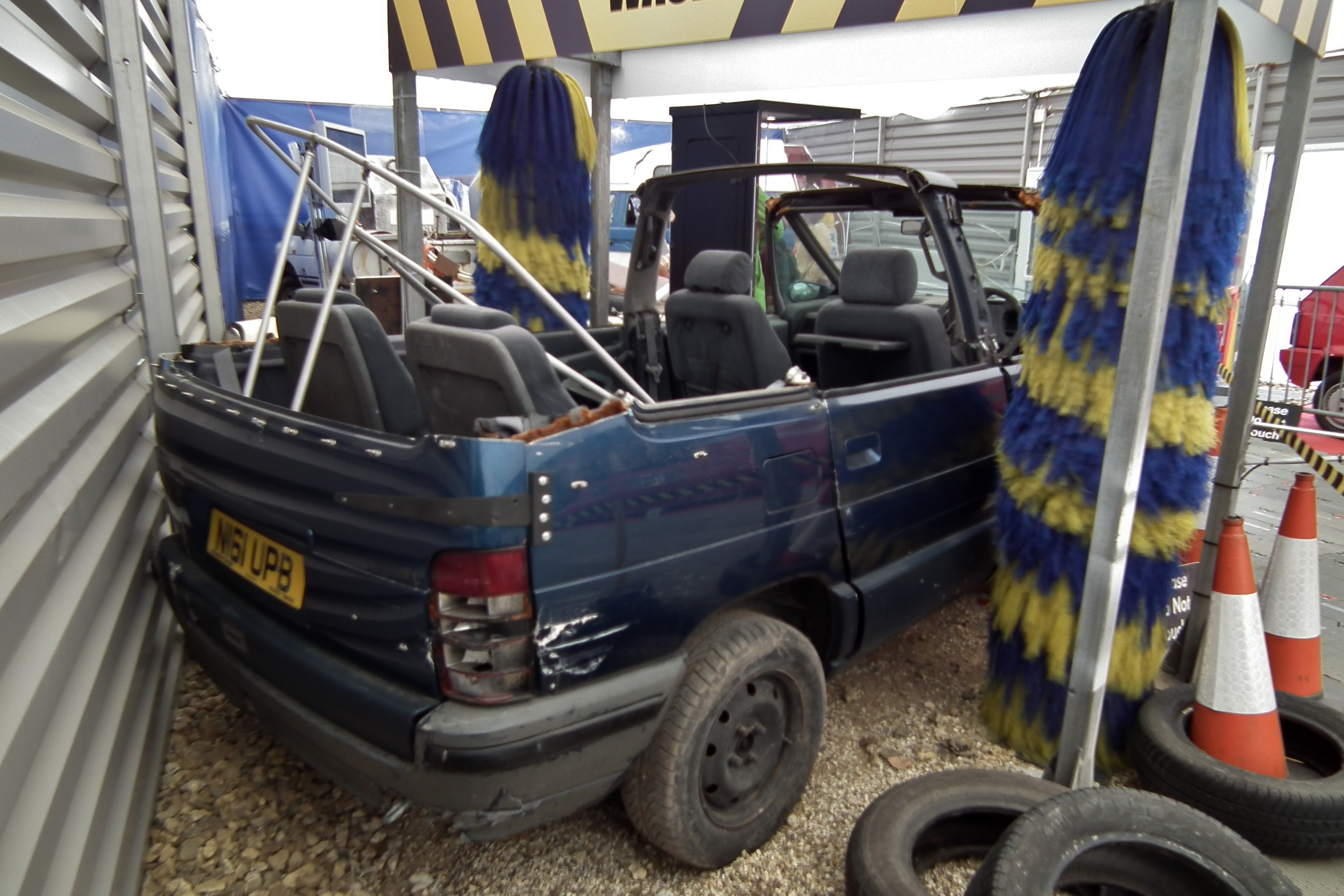
The modified convertible Renault Espace used in the challenge

The presenters were tasked with building a convertible people carrier. They succeeded in removing the roof from a 1996 Renault Espace and replaced it with a canvas fold-down top. The resulting vehicle was able to travel at 100 mph without losing its roof, and was driven through an animal park without incident. However, a trip through a car wash resulted in the brand-new million-pound wash facility catching fire.

=== Present a drive time radio show ===
Series Eight, Episode Two

The presenters tried to host a drive time radio show on BBC Southern Counties Radio in Brighton, but ended up with many complaints from the listeners. This was mainly because Clarkson's travel bulletins focussed on hounding motorists he could see dawdling on CCTV, rather than issuing the location of problem areas caused by such people and how to avoid them.

=== Amphibious vehicles ===
Series Eight, Episode Three

The presenters were set the challenge of building amphibious cars and using them to reach and cross a two-mile-wide reservoir. Hammond transformed a 1983 Volkswagen camper van into a narrowboat-style "damper van;" Clarkson attached an outboard motor to a modified 1989 Toyota Hilux pick-up truck, which he dubbed the "Toybota". May fitted a 1962 Triumph Herald with a mast and sails. This caused clearance problems on the road and he had to take an alternative route when on land due to a "low bridge." Hammond's dampervan was very heavy and slow on the road and quickly sank after entering the water. The Herald and Hilux performed well in the water, but the Herald was slow due to the sails. Clarkson drove the Hilux at high speeds in the water and was making good progress, but he rolled it over while trying to enter the pier. May was eventually voted the winner by the studio audience. Winner: May (Note: After the show, Clarkson and May insisted that their own cars were best; Clarkson said the Toybota was best because it would have reached the finish if it didn't roll over at the last moment in a good time, but James hit back, saying that it wasn't a race, and the Toybota rolled over anyway.)

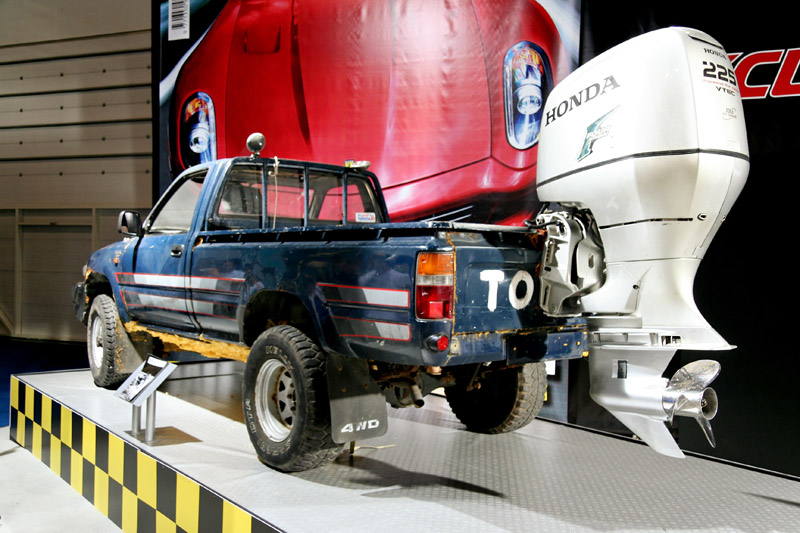
Clarkson's Toybota pickup

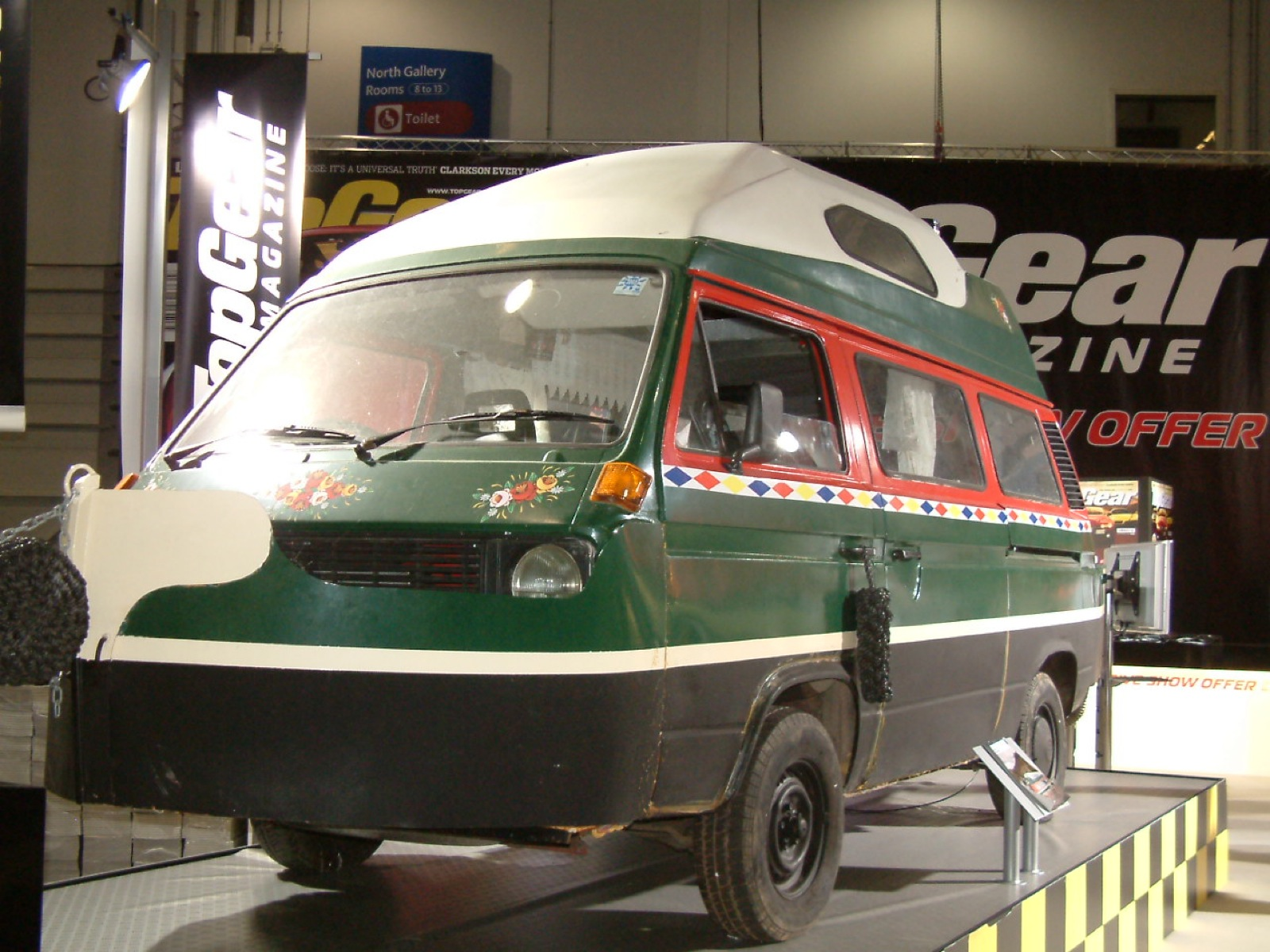
Hammond's Dampervan

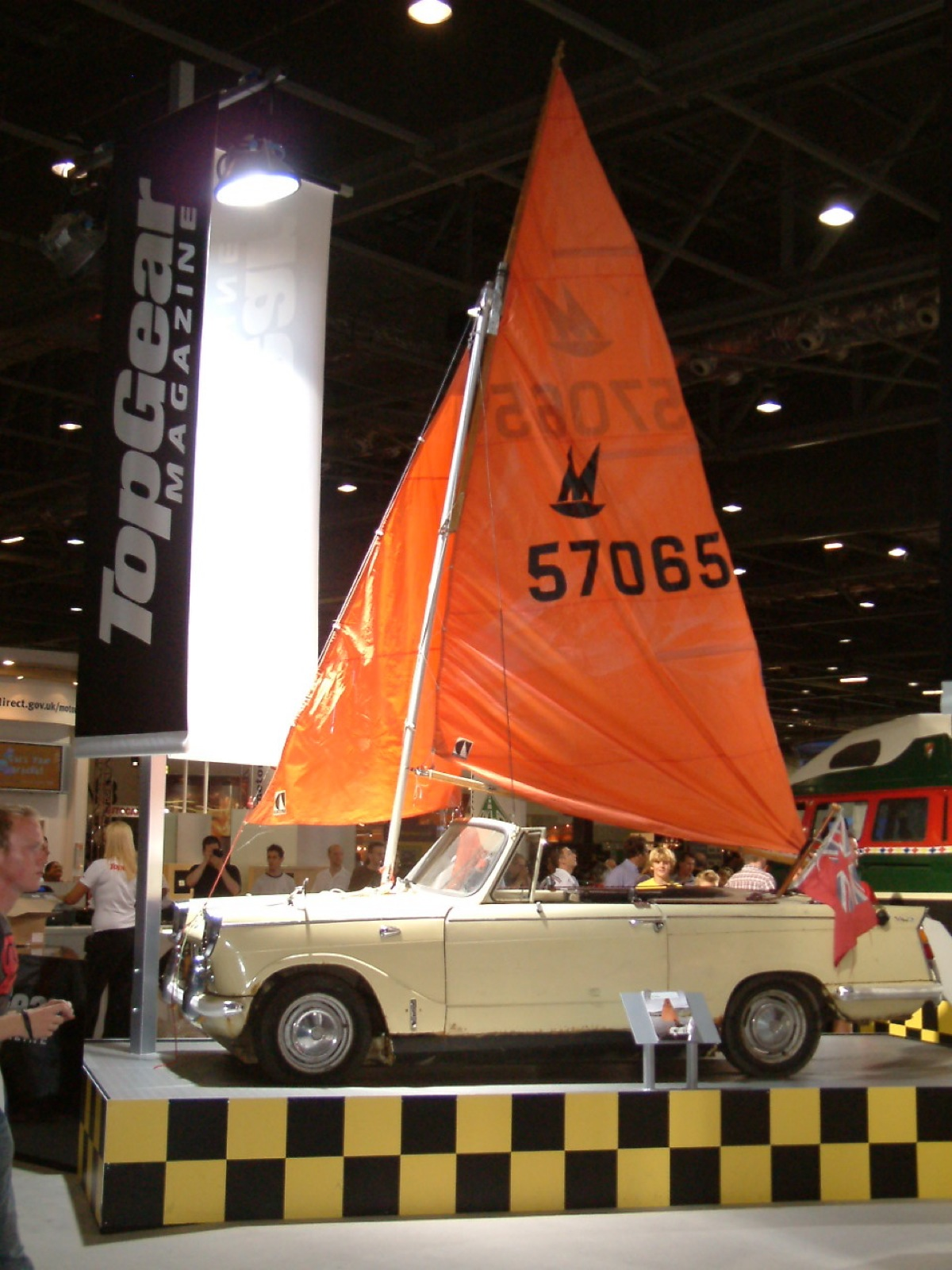
May's Triumph Herald

The amphibious vehicles used in the challenge

=== Car interior design ===
Series Eight, Episode Four

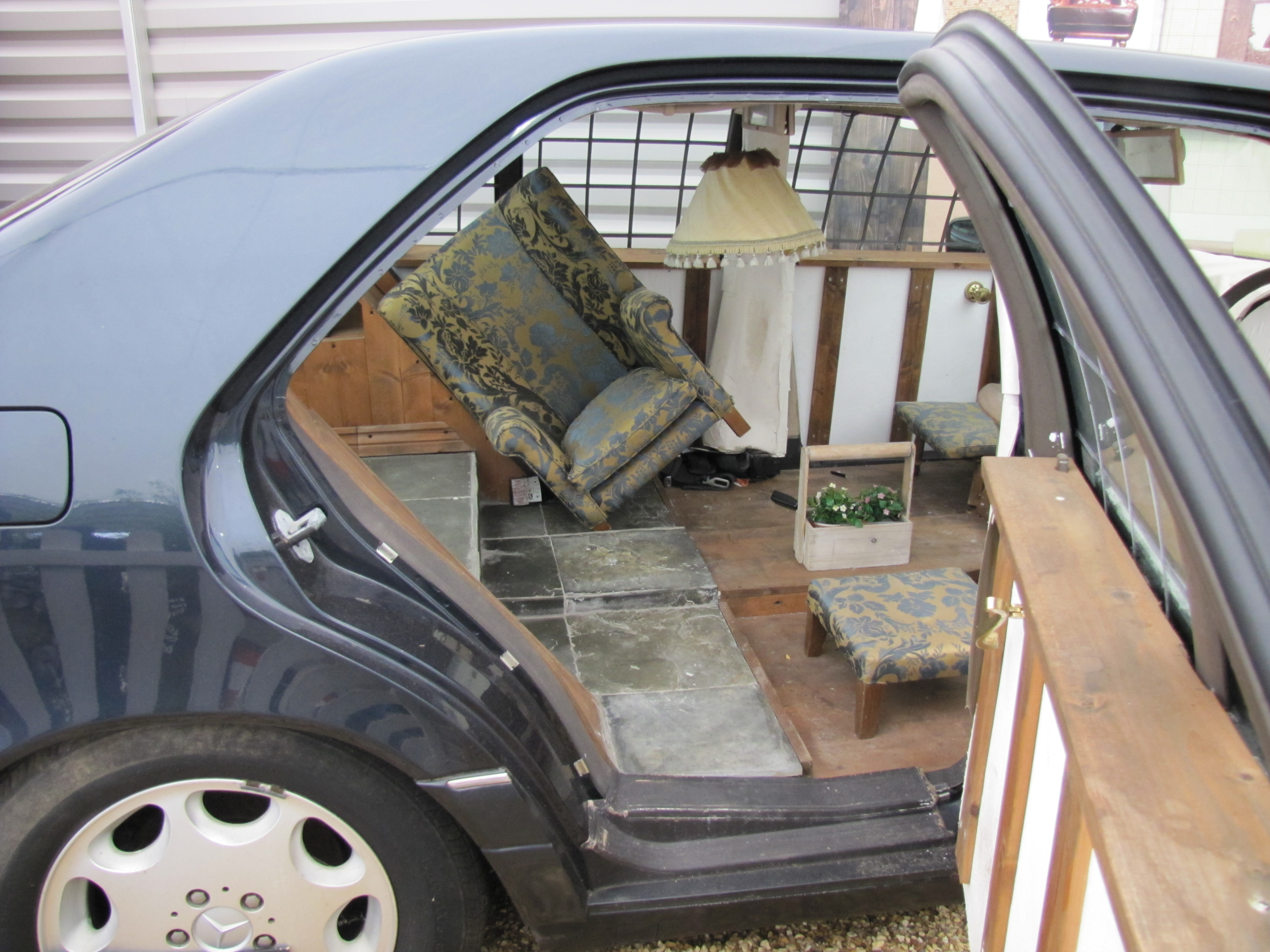
The interior of the Mercedes-Benz S280 used in the Car interior design challenge

Clarkson bought a 1996 Mercedes-Benz S280 and designed his perfect interior based upon his imagined perfect house. The car, dubbed "Anne Hathaway's Cottage", featured a wood-burning stove, kitchen chairs, a flagstone floor, and wood with a cement base (weighing approximately two tons), even plastering the door trim. May and Hammond then tested the car. A lack of seat belts and unsecured seats meant they tumbled around inside the car. Eventually, with May holding Hammond's seat, a 0–60 time of 35.4 seconds was established.

=== Improve your lap time by 20 seconds ===
Series Eight, Episode Five

Sir Jackie Stewart claimed that he could cut down any of the presenters' driving time around a race circuit by 20 seconds, so James took him up on the offer and they used a TVR Tuscan at Oulton Park.

=== Caravan holiday ===
Series Eight, Episode Six

Clarkson, May and Hammond went on a caravan holiday in Dorset to try to find out more about caravanning, bringing along an Elddis Shamal XL as their caravan. The trio unsuccessfully tried to have fun and caused numerous traffic jams. May crashed the caravan into a bollard. Hammond and the show's pet labradoodle, Top Gear dog were kidnapped by an elderly female fan. Clarkson "accidentally" set the caravan and its neighbour on fire while trying to cook chips.

=== Kit car race ===
Series Eight, Episode Seven

The presenters, based at Knockhill Racing Circuit in Fife, were set the task of building a Caterham Seven kit car from scratch and driving past the starting line faster than the time it would take The Stig to reach the track from the Caterham showroom in Caterham using a pre-built Caterham Seven kit car. The presenters won the challenge because The Stig was stopped by the traffic police just three miles from the finish. (The Stig "exercised his right to remain silent," and was taken into custody.)

=== Roadies van challenge ===
Series Eight, Episode Eight

The team decided to test some vans by working as roadies for The Who. May picked a 2005 Renault Master, Hammond chose a 2006 Ford Transit, and Clarkson selected a 2006 Volkswagen T30 TDI 174 Sportline. After The Who's concert at Hyde Park, Clarkson, Hammond and May took some of their equipment 90 miles to the site of their next show. They concluded that the cheapest van for the task at hand should always be used.

=== Road works in 24 hours ===
Series Nine, Episode One

The presenters decided to speed up the road works on the D5481 near Bidford in Warwickshire. According to the County Council, it would take an entire week, but the Top Gear team achieved it in just one day (although they did have 32 men working with them). According to the film, Clarkson prevented them from having meal breaks and instead fed them on the berries growing on the bushes by the side of the road. For tea, Hammond provided fish and chips for all. The team worked through the entire day and night to get the job done. Jeremy decided to motivate the men by putting on Margaret Thatcher speeches on a loudspeaker and saying "The sooner you're done, the sooner I'll turn her off." May took away Jeremy's megaphone (that he also used) and had a road-roller crush it.

=== Reliant Robin Space Shuttle ===
Series Nine, Episode Four

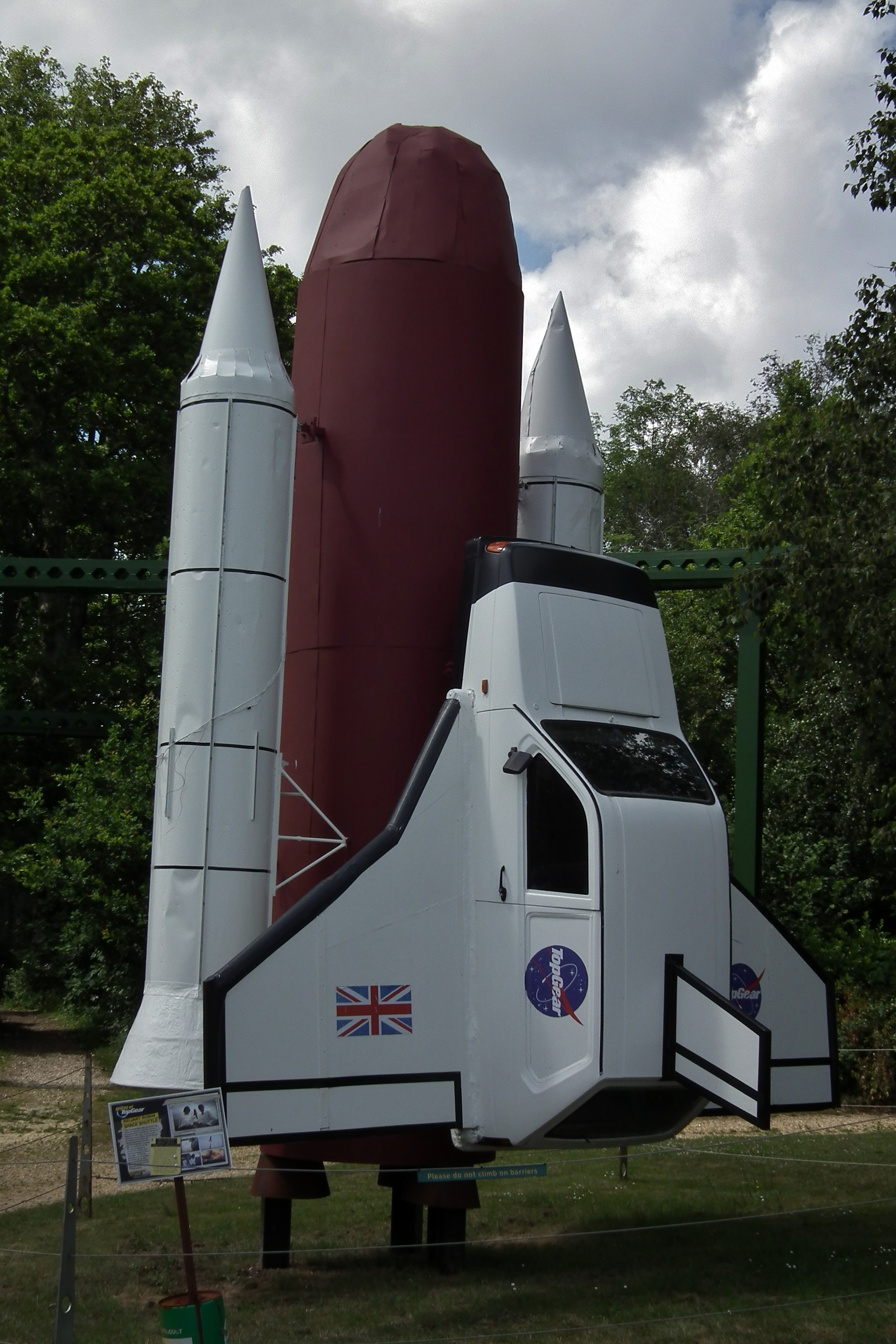
A replica of the Reliant Robin Space Shuttle

Hammond and May tried to convert a 1992 Reliant Robin into a Space Shuttle. They were given 12 days to build it and help from the United Kingdom Rocketry Association. Eight tonnes of thrust was required to launch the Robin—the largest non-commercial rocket launch undertaken in Europe. The Reliant Robin took off, but a release bolt attaching the Robin to the fuel tank failed to detach. The combined result spiraled out of control and crashed on a nearby hillside.

=== Growing petrol using tractors ===
Series Nine, Episode Five

The presenters decided to grow their own "environmentally friendly" petrol by planting rapeseed in a field. For this challenge, each presenter needed to research and acquire a tractor. Each presenter then took part in a series of challenges at the airfield, including a "drag" race, in which they raced each other while dragging something found around the airfield. In the end, it was discovered May had ordered the wrong type of seed, so they ended up with 500 gallons of biodiesel that was later used for the Britcar 24-hour endurance race.

=== Stretch limos ===
Series Nine, Episode Six

The presenters were sent out to buy normal cars that are available in Britain, then turn them into stretch limousines. Once the presenters had built their limos, they had to chauffeur three celebrities across London to the Brit Awards. Hammond chauffeured Jamelia in a 1996 MG F "Sports Limo," arriving with a stuck throttle and having to assist her exit with a pool ladder. Clarkson chauffeured Chris Moyles using a greatly lengthened, dual rear axle 1993 Fiat Panda, which as originally engineered had not been road legal, and arriving with only half a car after it split in two before reaching its destination. (Note: He had been required to shorten it to comply with the maximum length of an unarticulated car allowed on a British road, and subsequently the join in the middle made out of masking tape failed.) James May attempted to chauffeur Lemar in the "Salfa Romeaab" (a cross between the front ends of a 1996 Alfa Romeo 164 and a 1994 Saab 9000); Lemar ultimately got frustrated and got out of the car after May repeatedly got lost. Clarkson claimed victory by getting one photograph of his celebrity published in a newspaper. However, as his co-presenters pointed out, the image appeared in Clarkson's own newspaper column in The Sun (to which he responded that they also have newspaper columns that they could have used).

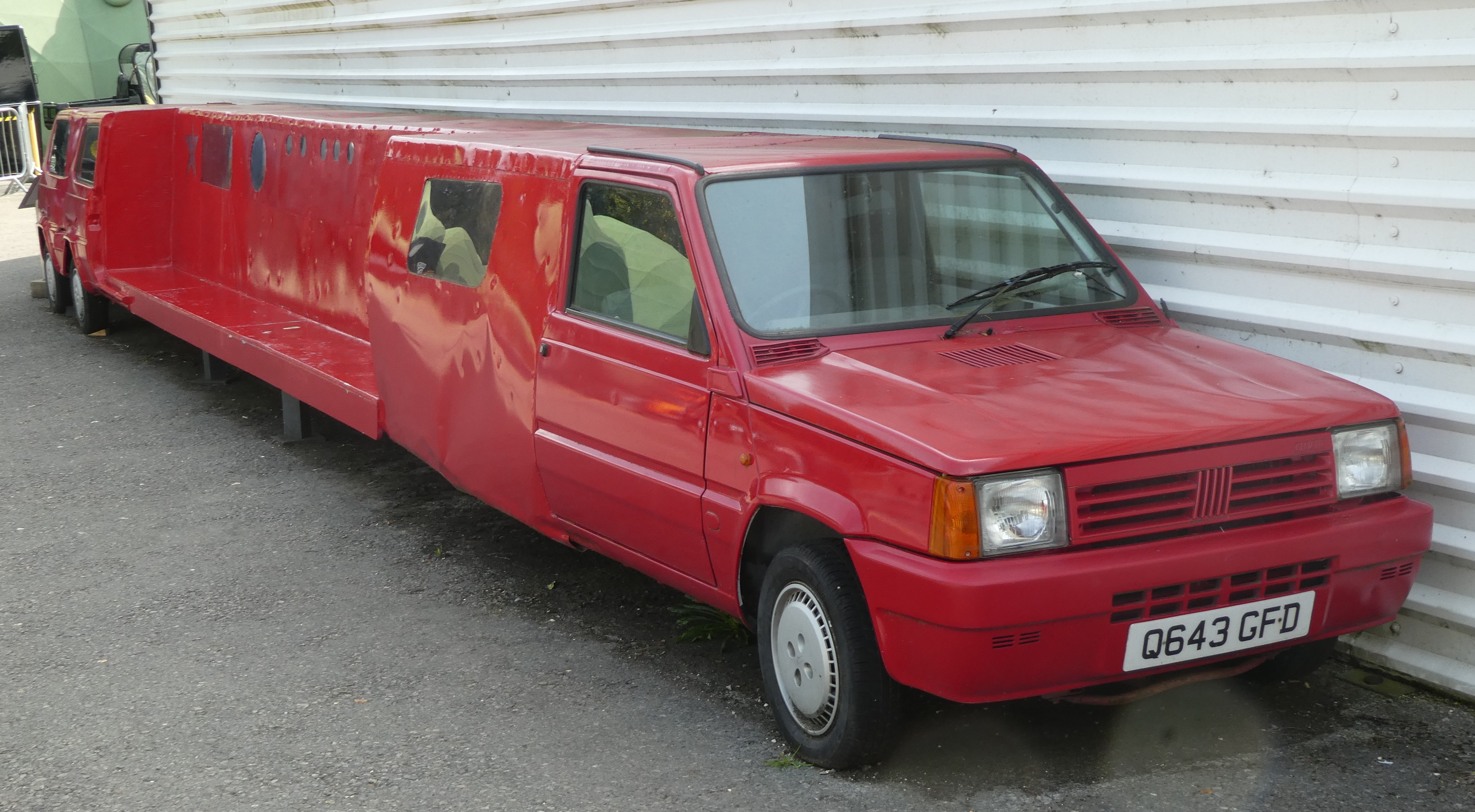
Clarkson's Fiat Panda

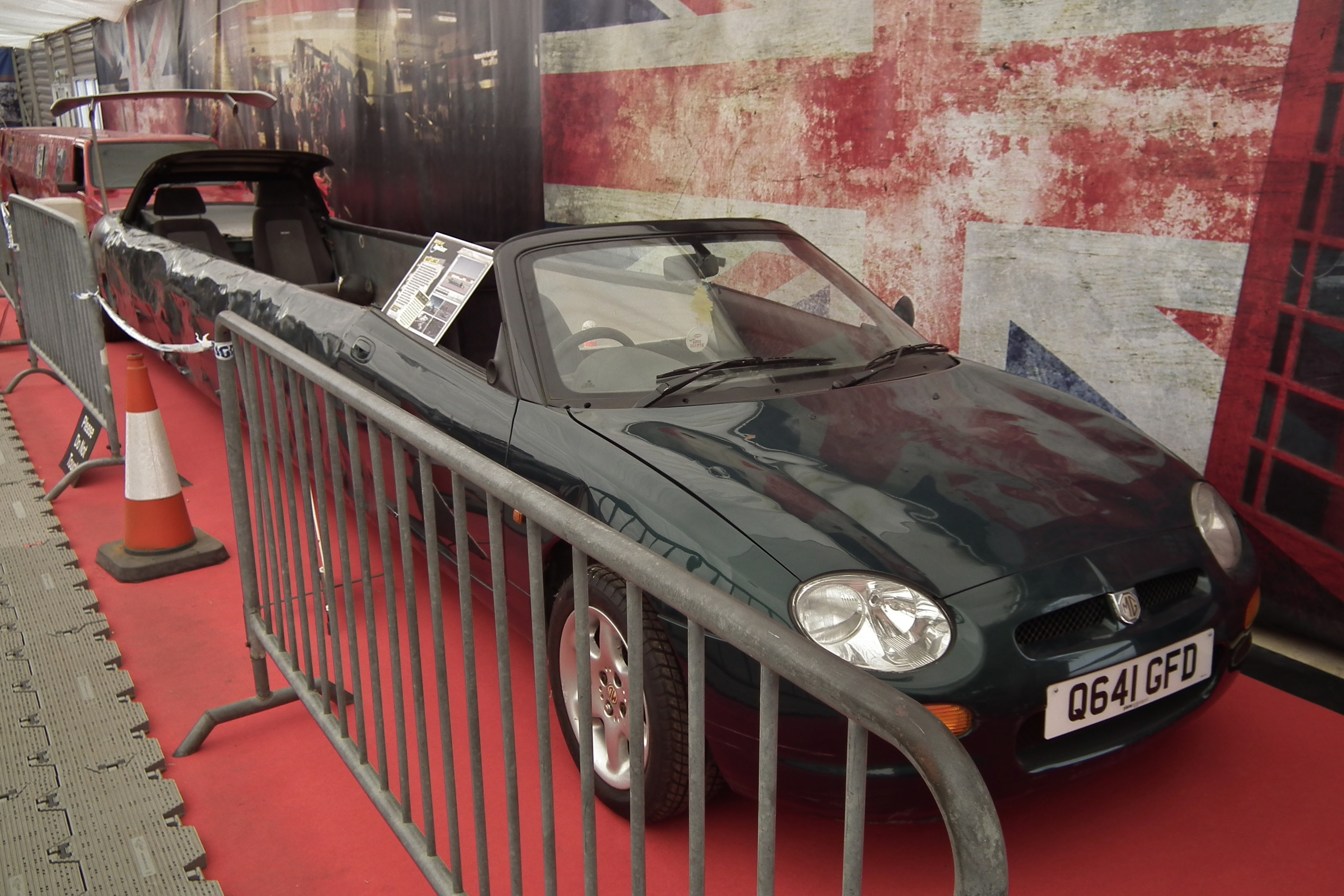
Hammond's MG F

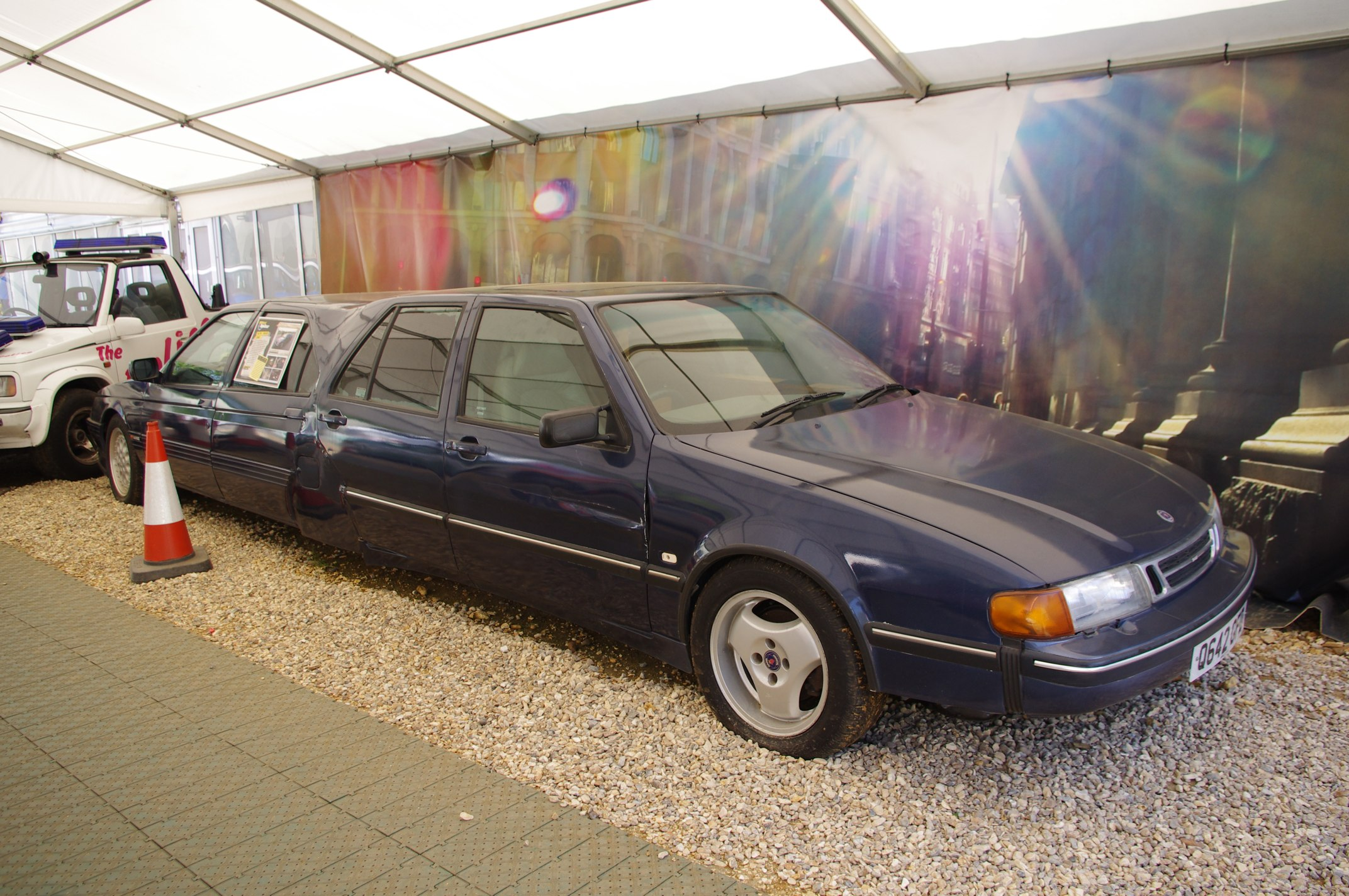
May's "Alfaab"

=== Polar race special ===
Polar Challenge Special

In April–May 2007, Clarkson and May teamed up to race Hammond from Resolute, Nunavut to the North Magnetic Pole, taking the route set out in the Polar Challenge. The terrain in between is some of the toughest in the world—a mix of mountainous land masses and jagged sea ice where temperatures can drop to −65 degrees Celsius (−85 degrees Fahrenheit). Clarkson and May used a specially adapted Toyota Hilux pick-up truck, while Hammond used a sled pulled by a team of ten Canadian Inuit dogs, driven by American explorer Matty McNair. The truck won, although the sled overtook them at one point while they were crossing the first of two fields of ice boulders.

In a DriveTribe video presented by Mike Fernie in May 2024, it was revealed that the first vehicle to reach the North Pole was not the presenter's car, but the one used by the film crew, which the presenters switched to due to severe damage sustained to the main vehicle. Continuity errors showing this change include the film crew vehicle not having window tints, nor extra interior lighting to help with the cameras; both vehicles still made it to the pole.

The Hilux used by the camera crew would later appear in Series fifteen, Episode One, modified to be able to drive near Eyjafjallajökull volcano in Iceland to obtain a lava rock.

=== Amphibious cars: redux ===
Series Ten, Episode Two

The presenters made a second attempt to use amphibious cars—this time to cross the English Channel. All three presenters modified their original designs: Clarkson created an amphibious 1996 Nissan pickup truck; Hammond used a "new" 1981 Volkswagen Transporter; May used the same but upgraded 1962 Triumph Herald he had used in the original challenge. May was unable to sail the Herald out of the harbour, sinking twice and damaging the vehicle beyond repair. Hammond's Transporter worked well initially, but the engine was damaged in rough seas, necessitating the use of an outboard engine. It eventually flooded and sank. Clarkson won while carrying his co-presenters in his "Nissank" on the trip. The presenters had aimed for Calais, but missed, finishing in Sangatte. They also attempted (and failed) to break the record set by Richard Branson for the fastest crossing of the Channel in an amphibious vehicle. Winner: Clarkson

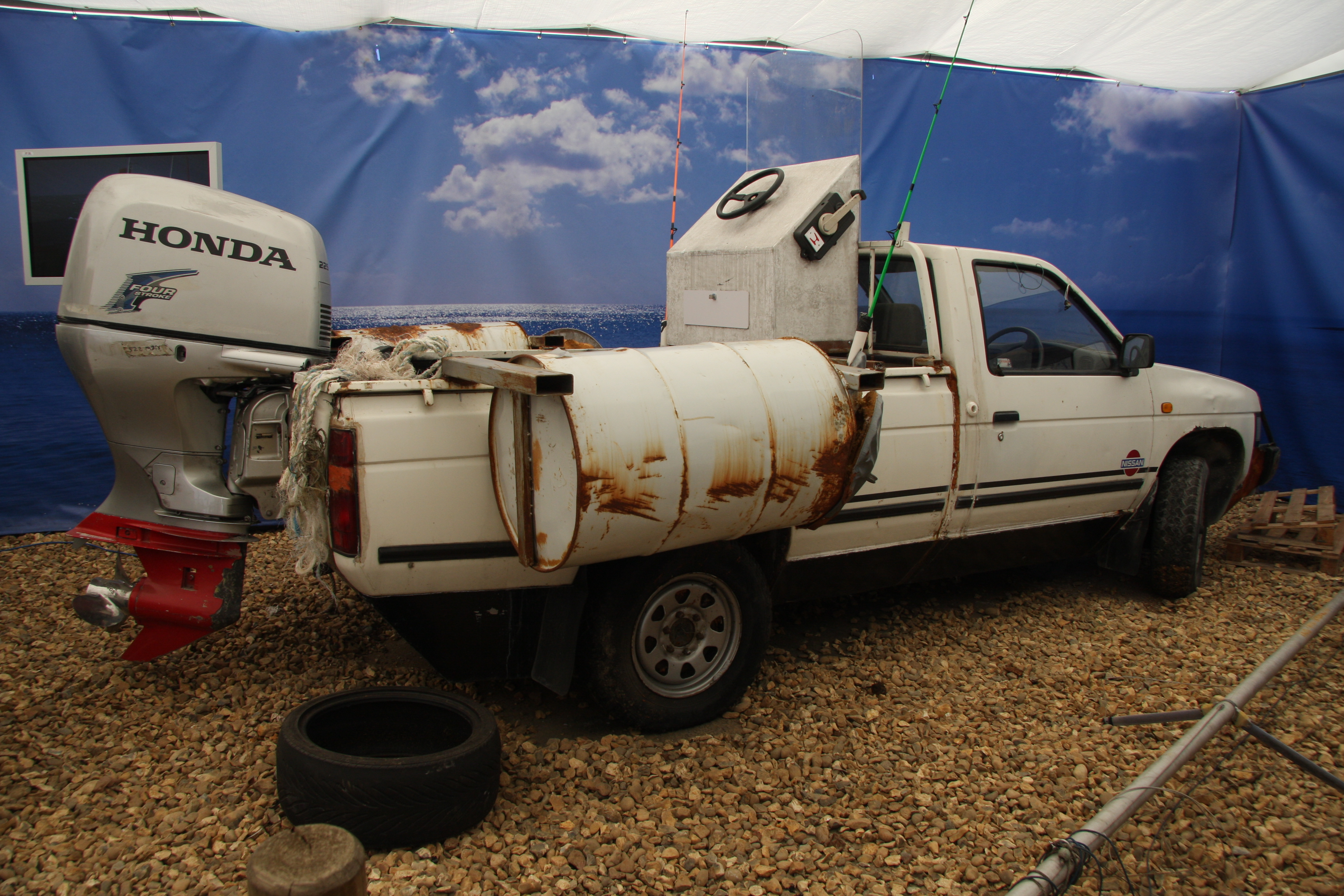
Clarkson's Nissan Navara pickup

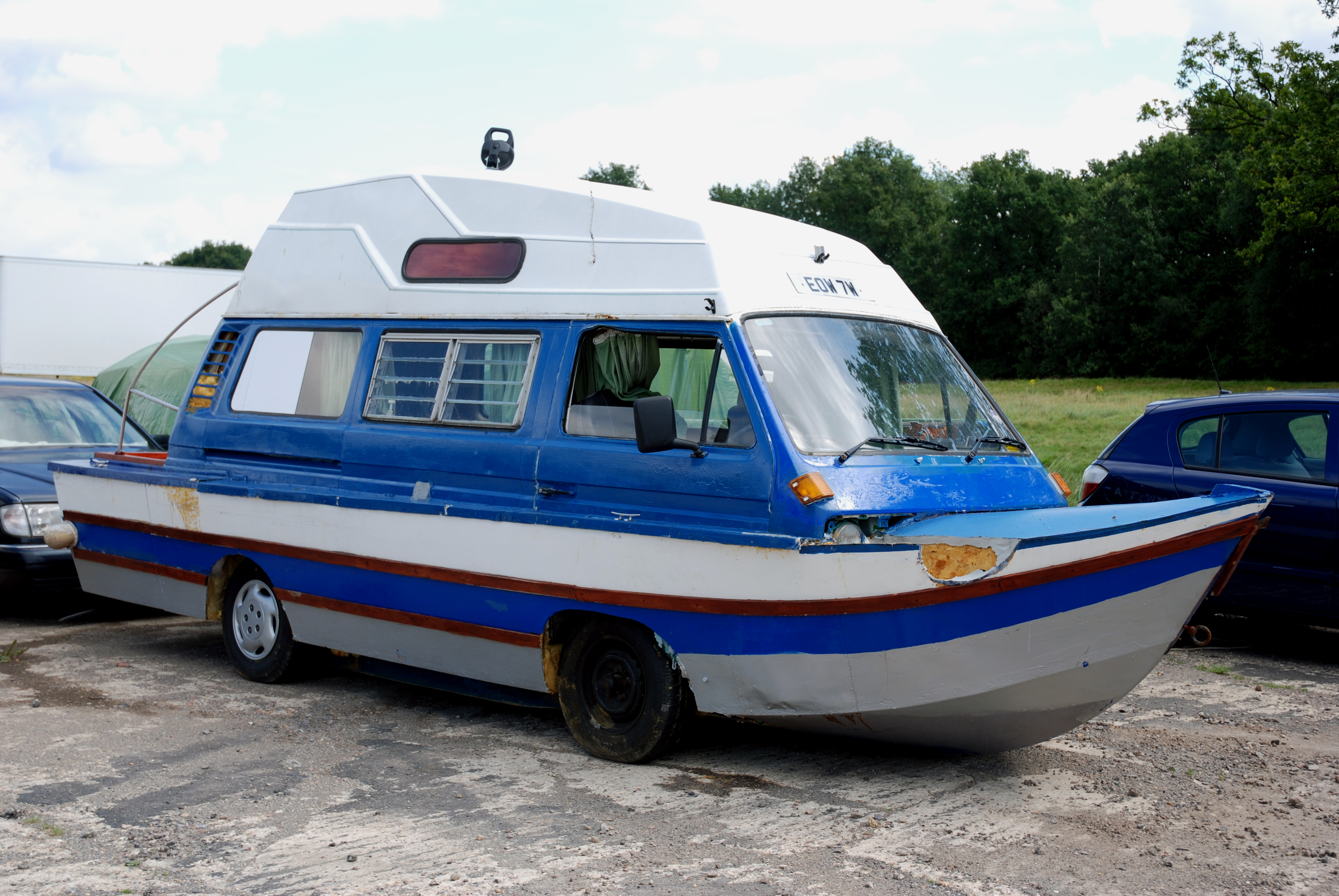
Hammond's Volkswagen Transporter

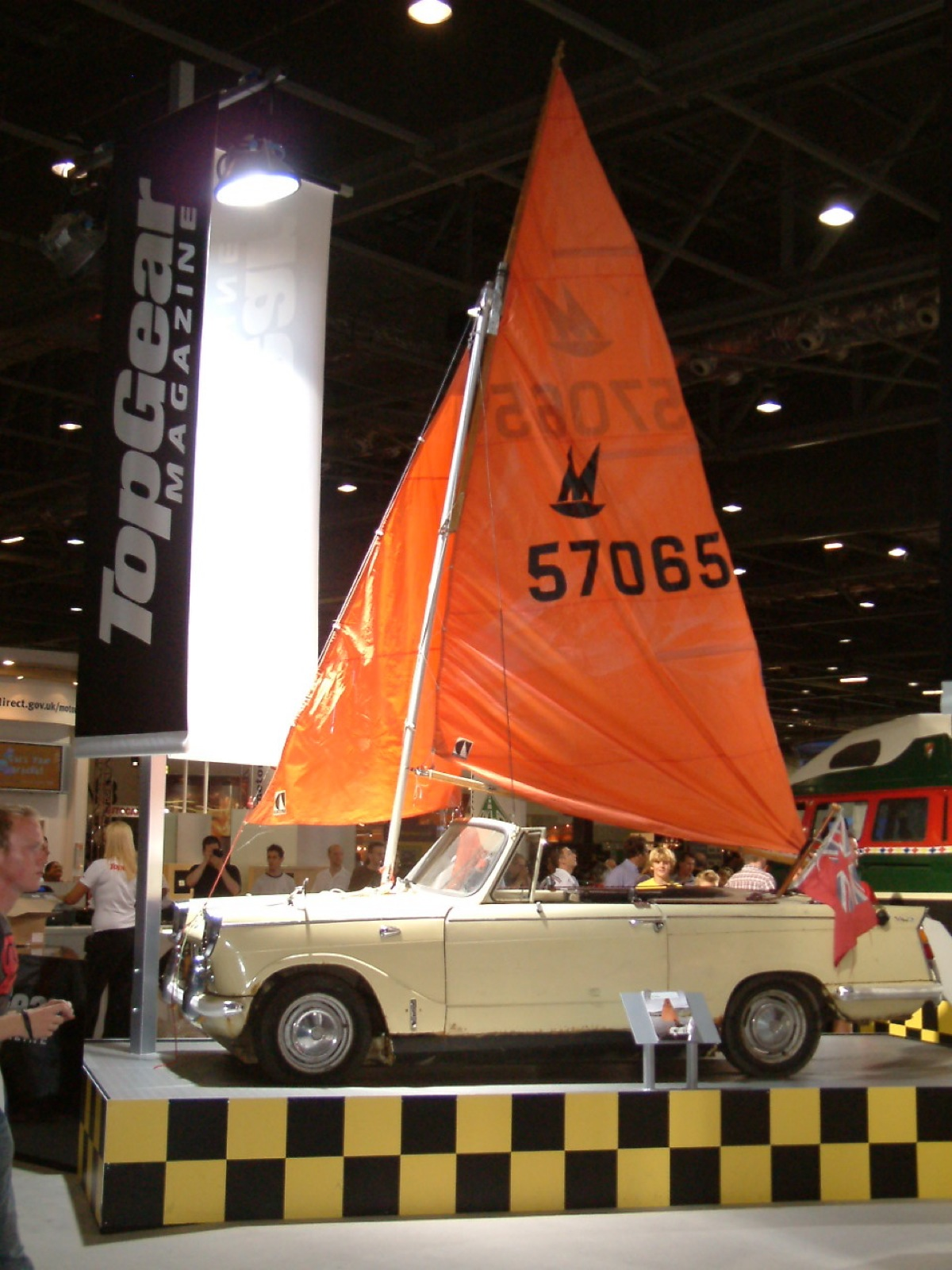
May's Triumph Herald

The modified designs used in the second attempt at the amphibious car challenge

=== Driving a Formula 1 car ===
Series Ten, Episode Eight

Hammond set out to complete two laps around Stowe Circuit at Silverstone driving the Renault R25 Formula One car, which took the driver's (with Fernando Alonso) and constructor's championship titles in the 2005 Formula One season.

=== Britcar 24-hour endurance race ===
Series Ten, Episode Nine

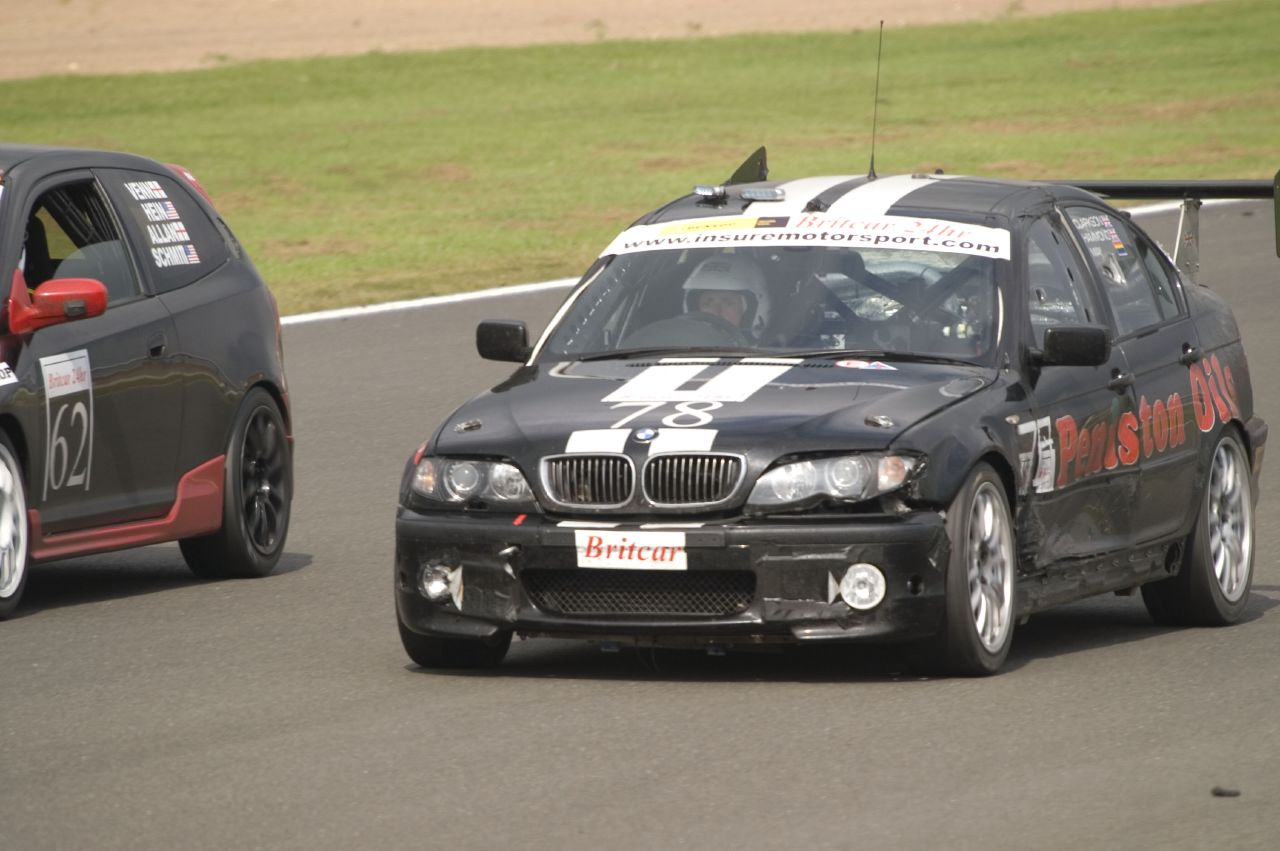
Richard Hammond driving Top Gear's diesel BMW 330d in the Britcar 24 Hours.

In the previous series, the presenters planted their own biofuel crop, which was rapeseed. However, due to an ordering blunder made by May, they accidentally made 500 gallons worth of biodiesel. In order to dispose of it, they took part in the 2007 Britcar 24-hour endurance race at Silverstone Circuit using a modified 2003 BMW 330d. Arriving at the event, the team discovered that it was not an event for novices, as they had expected, but it was a fully professional endurance race and they would be competing alongside actual 200 mph supercars. With help from The Stig, they eventually finished third in class and 39th out of 46 finishers, despite a fuel pump failure, only just making the start, several fuel leaks, going off the track many times, and Hammond crashing into a Mosler.

=== Renault Avantime tuning challenge ===
Series Twelve, Episode Three

The presenters were challenged to make an ordinary car lap the track as fast as a Mitsubishi Lancer Evolution X, which posted a time of 1 minute 28 seconds, using only the price difference from that ordinary car to a used Lancer Evo as their budget. They did not know what car they would have to work with. Despite May's prediction of a Hyundai Accent 3-cylinder diesel, the car was revealed to be a 2002 Renault Avantime 3.0 V6. Notwithstanding various modifications—including wheels, tyres, brakes, the exhaust of an unknown TVR, the rear wing from a Super Aguri F1 car (which was later taken off), and a wooden front splitter (which caught fire; the fire was put out by Hammond as Clarkson chased May for saying "Back to the studio" before him)—the presenters were unable to beat the Evo's time. They did improve on the original time by 7.1 seconds, but this was achieved mostly through a combination of swapping out the heavy, electrically heated seats that came with the Avantime for much lighter carbon fibre racing seats, and May servicing the engine to get it nearer its originally rated power. The presenters noted that the other modifications generally did not help, and some even made the car slower. The only modifications that did work properly cost little beyond the time, effort and relatively simple equipment used.

=== From Basel to Blackpool on a single tank of fuel ===
Series Twelve, Episode Four

The presenters were challenged to drive from Basel, Switzerland to Blackpool, England, on a single tank of fuel, in order to switch on the Blackpool Illuminations. Although each presenter chose a different route, Clarkson estimated the distance to be approximately 750 miles. Each presenter chose diesel vehicles: Clarkson used a 2007 Jaguar XJ6 Diesel, and in spite of using every feature in the car and driving uneconomically, completed the journey. He was beaten by Hammond, driving a 2008 Volkswagen Polo BlueMotion, although the presenters agreed that the Jag was "the real winner". May, driving a 2008 Subaru Legacy, arrived 40 minutes after Clarkson.

=== Make a car advertisement ===
Series Thirteen, Episode Seven

May and Clarkson were given the challenge to create a simple, but effective, TV advertisement for the new Volkswagen Scirocco TDi. Several entries were made, including one stating that, while the Scirocco was not fast, it was economical, a rehash of a previous Golf ad, and one detailing a funeral. All were rejected, leading Clarkson and May to create separate ads. Clarkson won with references to World War II.

=== Build an electric car ===
Series Fourteen, Episode Two

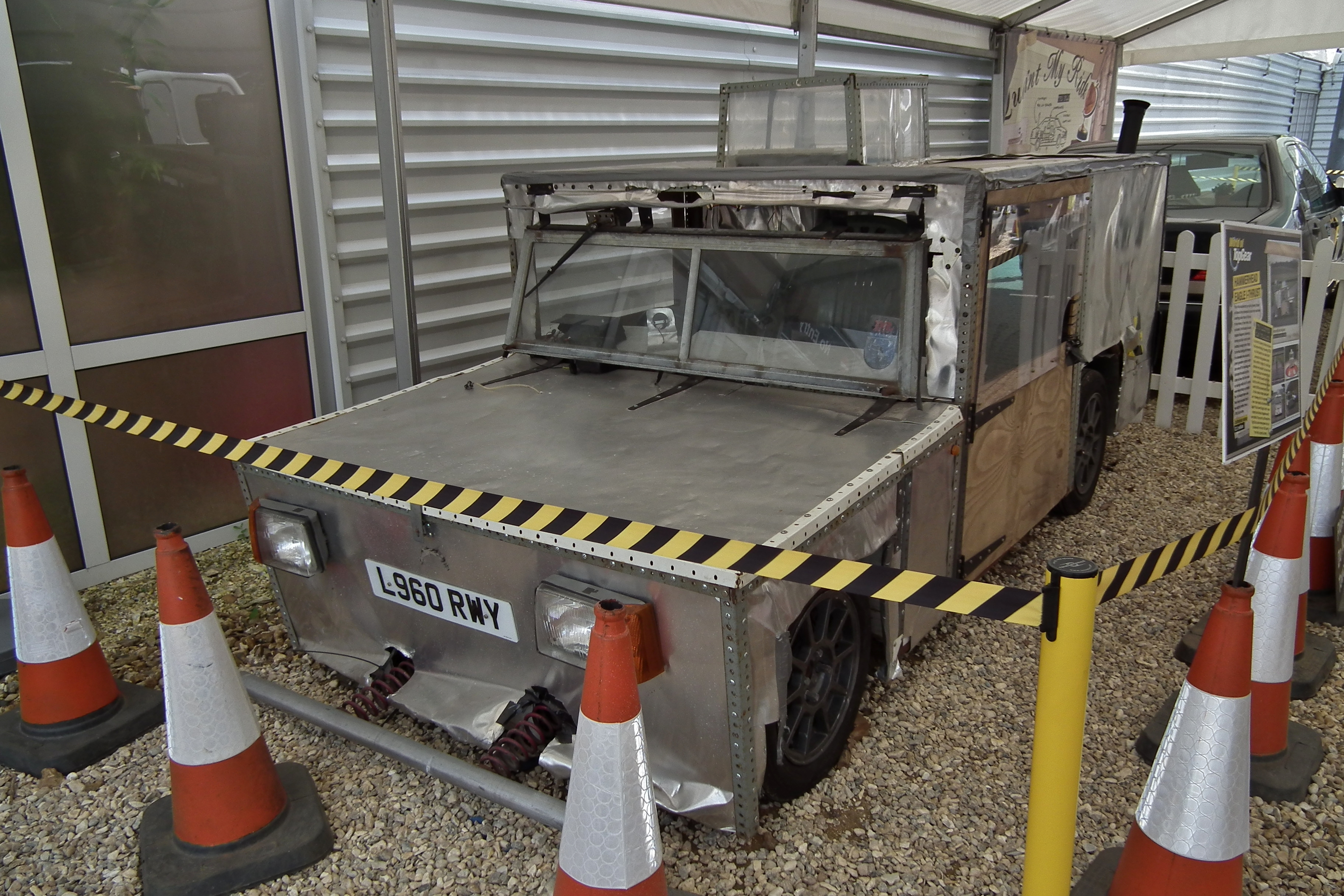
The Hammerhead Eagle i-Thrust which the presenters built for the show

The presenters were challenged to create their own electric car to rival the G-Wiz. The first car, nicknamed "Geoff", which was based on the chassis of a TVR Chimaera, was put through its paces in the city of Oxford, before being re-built as the Hammerhead Eagle i-Thrust. The Hammerhead underwent a number of safety tests at the Motor Industry Research Association, with the Top Gear trio attempting to fool the examiners by using simple camera trickery. It was then reviewed by Autocar magazine, with the team disappointed by the review, while making a reference to OFCOM, the telecommunications regulator.

=== Build a snowplough ===
Series Sixteen, Episode Five

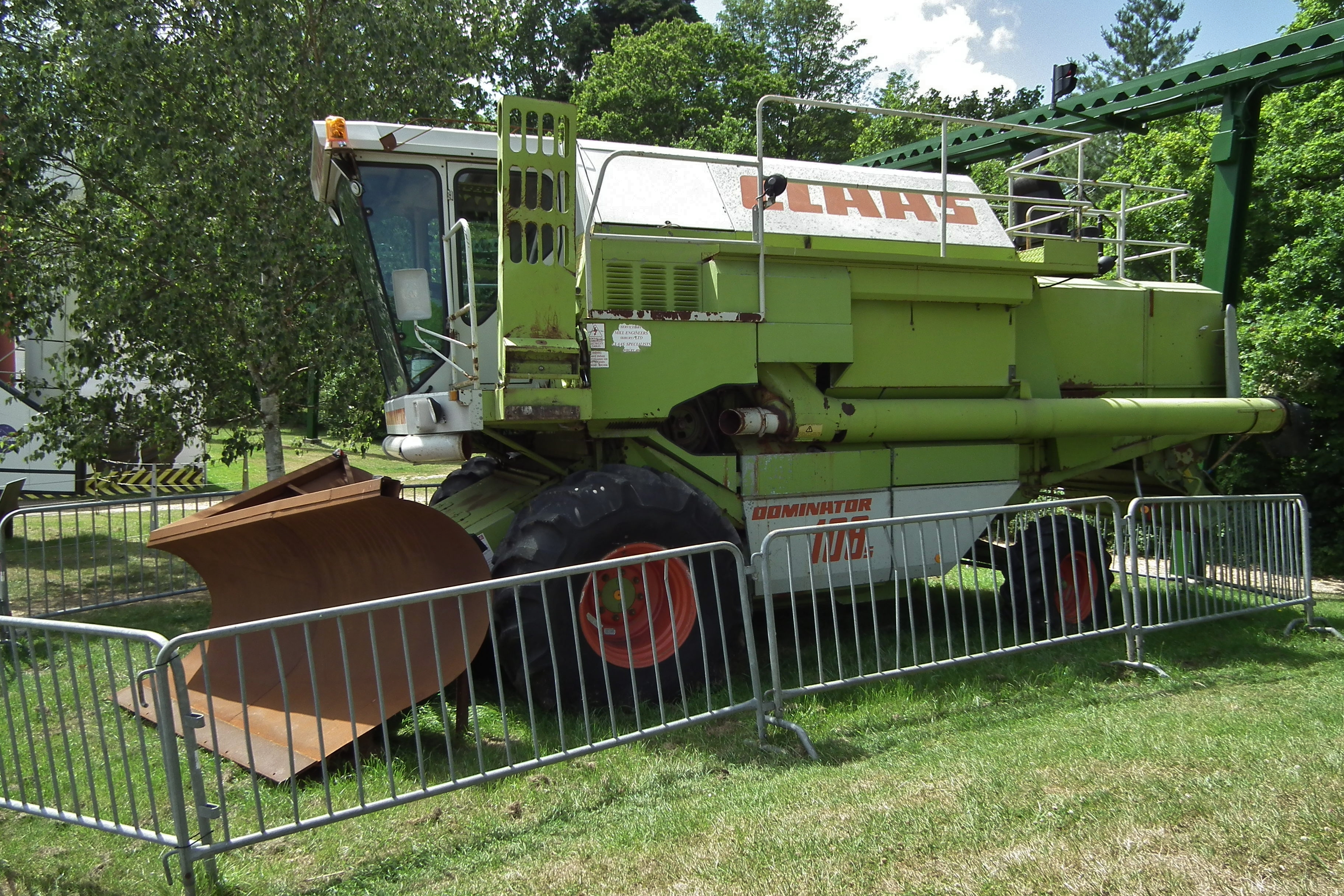
The modified Claas Dominator Snowbine Harvester

Due to problems caused by snow in the previous winter and local authorities not having the money to spend on road clearing equipment, the presenters came up with the idea of the Snowbine Harvester to save money, working on the theory that combine harvesters were sitting idle during winter months so were readily available with a cheap conversion kit. The team fitted a snowplough to the front of a used Claas Dominator. It was also converted to a gritter using the grain chute, capable of blasting grit through the windows of nearby cars. A flamethrower was fitted at the rear, operated by Clarkson, and a Bovril boiler in the cab for May to counter the lack of heating. During testing in and around Beitostølen in Norway, the team blasted grit through a house window, set fire to a man and ran into a car hidden by snow. They then successfully ploughed a road that had not previously been ploughed that winter. The team admitted that this was an unusual challenge in that they were ultimately "ambitious and successful" - contrary to the usual challenge results.

=== Build a train ===
Series Seventeen, Episode Four

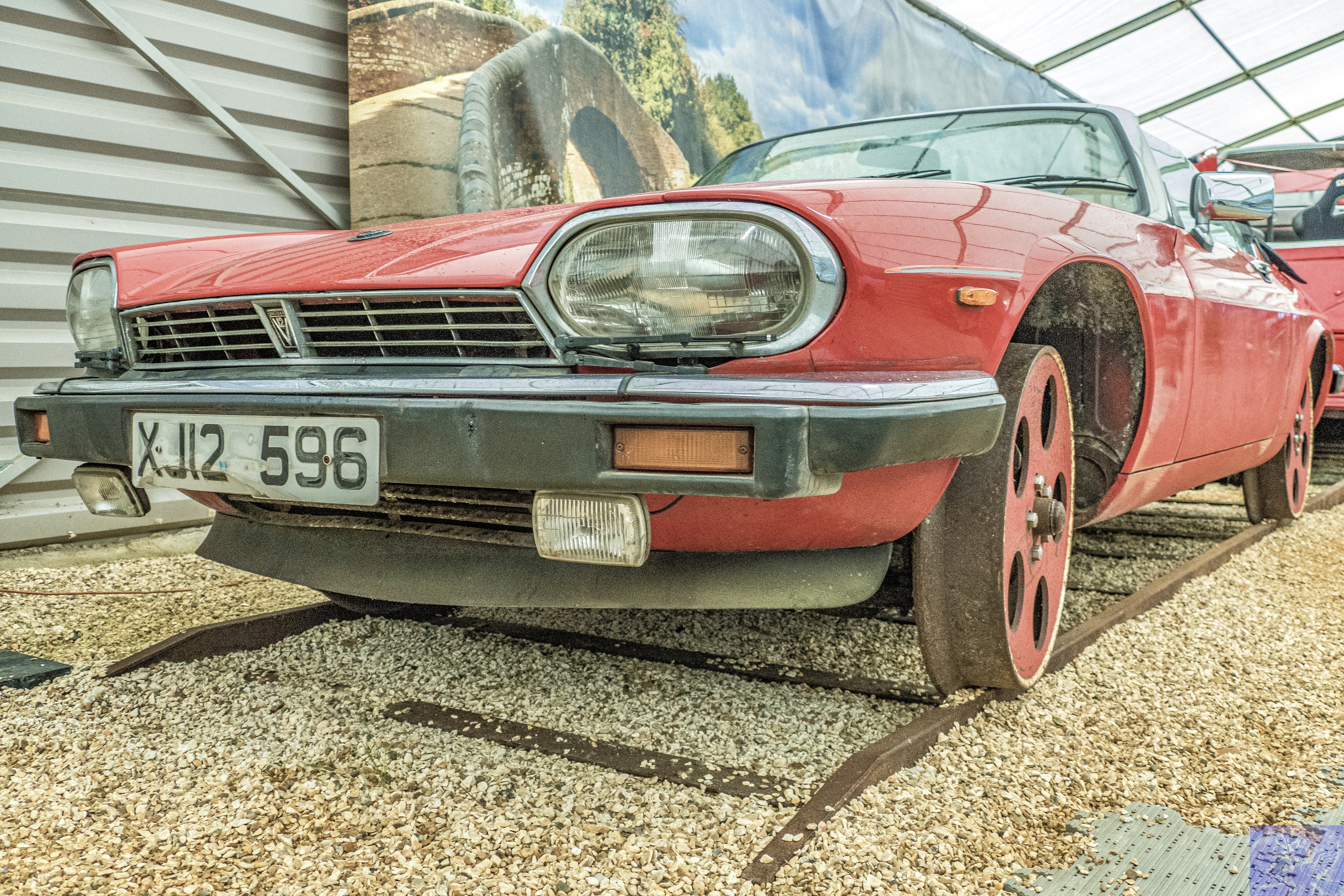
Clarkson's modified Jaguar XJS

The presenters believed that train travel in the UK was too expensive and that the main reason was that trains were expensive to build. They converted a 1990 5.3 V12 Jaguar XJS to work on the railway, before building carriages from old caravans for the varying classes of passenger (first, second, "scum") and a buffet car using wheels from Permanent Way trollies. The Jaguar was unable to pull the four "carriages" due to their weight and the Jaguar's rear-wheel-drive. The presenters split into two teams, with Clarkson taking the Jaguar and promising to build a "Train GTI", later referred to as the "TGV12", and Hammond and May converting a four-wheel-drive 2001 Audi S8 to pull the existing carriages.

The presenters (with their respective creations) then raced from "just outside Leicester" (Leicester North) to "near Loughborough" (Loughborough Central) on the Great Central Railway with railway experts as passengers. Clarkson won the race despite getting caught behind Hammond and May at times and almost colliding with the No. 10119 Margaret Ethel-Thomas Alfred Naylor train after attempting to 'overtake' the caravan train. Meanwhile, the buffet car on Hammond's and May's train had caught fire, and after stopping short of Loughborough, the "scum class" carriage was hit and destroyed by passing diesel locomotive D123 Leicestershire and Derbyshire Yeomanry.

=== Off-road mobility scooters ===
Series Eighteen, Episode Four

The presenters were tasked with creating their own off-road mobility scooters for rambling in the Welsh countryside. Clarkson builds an eight-wheeler with two engines from two electric scooters with lawnmower wheels. May made an electric wheelchair and Hammond created his machine from a mobility trike and a petrol powered builders' wheelbarrow, with a single wheel at the front and crawler tracks at the back. The task ended with a race in the countryside against three wounded soldiers. Only Hammond managed to finish the race, with Clarkson's scooter falling down a hill into a set of trees and May aborting the mission and getting stuck outside a pub near Crickhowell.

=== Hovervan ===
Series Twenty, Episode Four

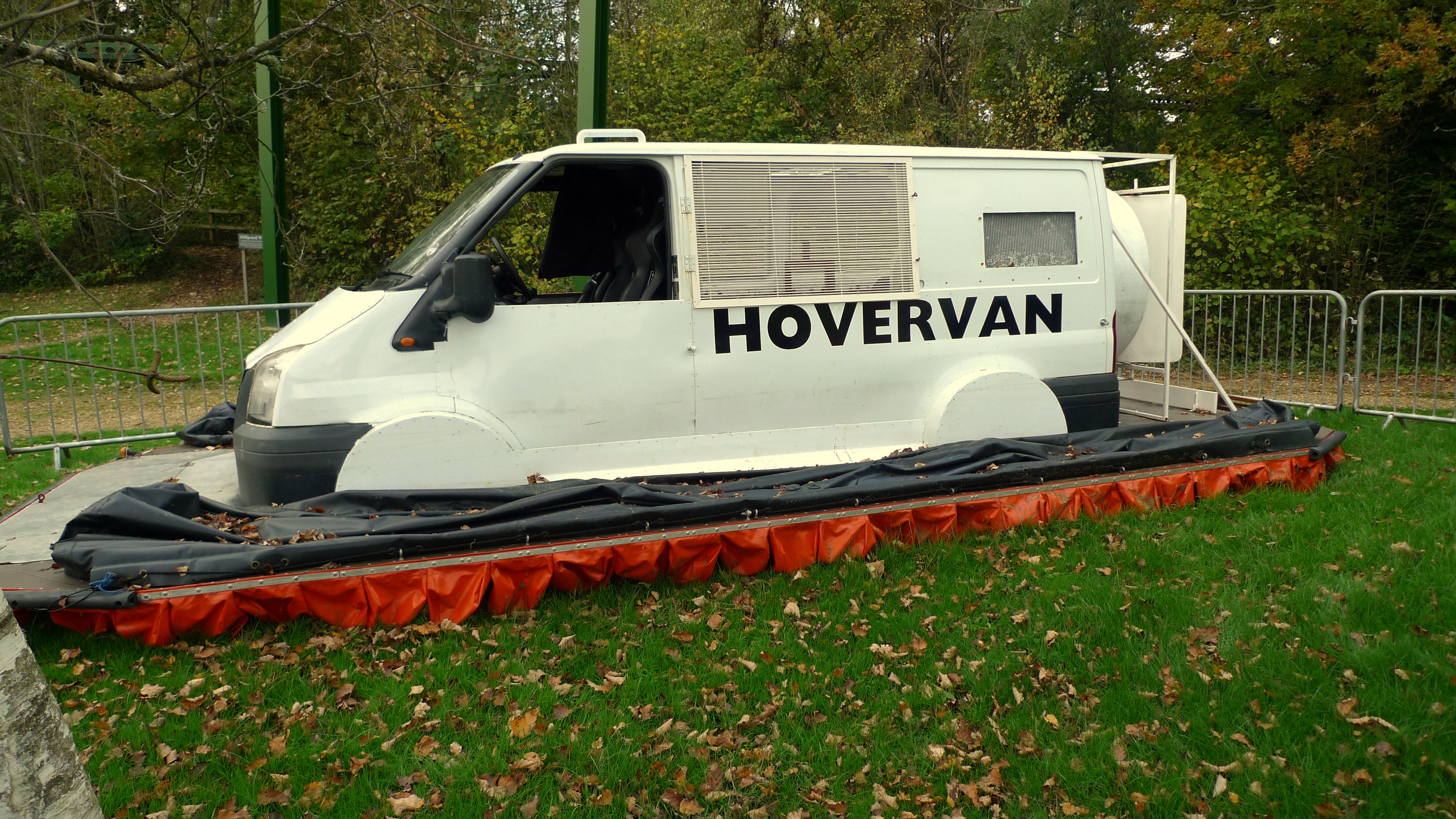
The Ford Transit Hovervan

The presenters were tasked with creating an all purpose vehicle that can withstand Britain's floods and also function as a practical vehicle. The trio decided to combine a hovercraft with a 2007 Ford Transit van for this task, coining it the "Hovervan". The van was fitted with an inflatable air skirt and blower engines at the rear. The first version of the hovervan failed to stay afloat on water as a result of a small air skirt and leaks throughout. This was resolved in the second version with a larger air skirt and a more water-tight body. The trio then drove their hovervan along the River Avon in Bristol, causing chaos along the way.

=== Convertible supercars for all weather ===
Series Twenty Four, Episode Two

Chris Harris and Matt LeBlanc were tasked with finding the perfect all-weather convertible supercar. LeBlanc brought a Lamborghini Huracan Spyder and Harris brought a Porsche 911 Turbo S convertible. They were told to report in Las Vegas for a series of challenges along a 400-mile road trip from Las Vegas to the Sierra Nevada mountains. The first challenge, named "Spring", was held at Spring Mountain Raceway, where they had to complete a lap of the track with the roof down at the beginning and finish with the roof up. Along the way, a firetruck simulated the effects of a spring rain. In the second challenge named "Summer", they had to switch cars (written as "take a vacation from your car", in keeping with the summer vacation spirit) and drive across Death Valley. Before the third challenge, they had to spend the night at Darwin, California. In the third challenge, named "Fall" they had to freewheel down a section of a slippery mountain road. As they climbed higher into the mountains, the final challenge took place at Mammoth Mountain, where they had to race across the snow. On the final challenge, LeBlanc initially made good progress as Harris' Porsche got temporarily stuck, but he later caught up, as the Lamborghini's low ground clearance left LeBlanc stuck until he chained the Lamborghini's rear tyres. Despite this, Harris narrowly won the race.

=== Building the world's fastest tractor ===
Series Twenty Five, Episode Five

In an effort to fix the tractor's slow speed, LeBlanc and Harris headed to the "Top Gear Agricultural Technology Centre", where LeBlanc built a custom tractor with a 500 hp Chevrolet V8 engine, dubbed the "Track-tor". To prove the tractor's performance credentials, he aimed for 81 mph in order to beat a previous world speed record set in Finland. He did reach 81 mph, but The Stig pushed it to 87 mph, setting a new world record. Next, they headed to a farm to see if the Track-tor was as useful as other tractors, specifically the New Holland T7 tractor, driven by Robert Neill, 2017 Farmer of the Year. The first test was hedge cutting, where the Track-tor's power overwhelmed the presenters as it frequently did wheelies and killed the scarecrow in the process. The next test was ploughing, where the Track-tor did a poor job. The final challenge was to harvest vegetables from the farm and transport it to the freezer section of a local village market eight miles away in under 23 minutes, assisted by The Stig. The presenters managed to do so with ten seconds to spare.

=== Building the ultimate family car ===
Series Twenty Seven, Episode Three

Paddy McGuinness, thinking that he could find the ultimate family car on the cheap, set out to buy a 1995 Daimler hearse for just £1,300. At the track, the challenges included a "last space drag race" against Britain's best-selling family cars; Harris drove a Volkswagen Touran, while Andrew Flintoff drove a Kia Sportage (Damon Hill made an appearance as guest driver in a Citroën Berlingo), which the hearse comfortably won due to its 240-horsepower, 4.0 liter 6-cylinder engine. A boot space challenge followed to test for practicality, which the hearse won again. A few days later, Harris and Flintoff decided to modify the hearse and meet at Tenby. The hearse sported a 4.0 liter V8 engine from a Lexus LS400, alongside a host of other modifications from full respray to Polestar Blue to amenities such as a ball pit and a "naughty step". Dubbed "The Overtaker", the presenters had to do a family holiday in Wales. First, they headed for the local beach where they had to beat a rival holidaymaker in a Mercedes-Benz E63 AMG estate; McGuinness claimed that he scored a moral victory due to the hearse's cheap price. Next, they went to Walters Arena for their next challenge: a race to the campsite against Land Rover Discovery driven by a family of Stigs, where the hearse tipped over. The next day, the presenters mended the hearse and met at Mendips Raceway for their final challenge: banger racing to test the car's safety, which McGuinness insisted on doing, with Harris and Flintoff serving as McGuinness's outriders; one of the competitors is Sabine Schmitz in a Volvo estate. Despite the harsh treatment the hearse received, its engine still ran by the end of the show.

=== Building a capable off-roader for less cost than the new Land Rover Defender ===
Series Twenty Eight, Episode Two

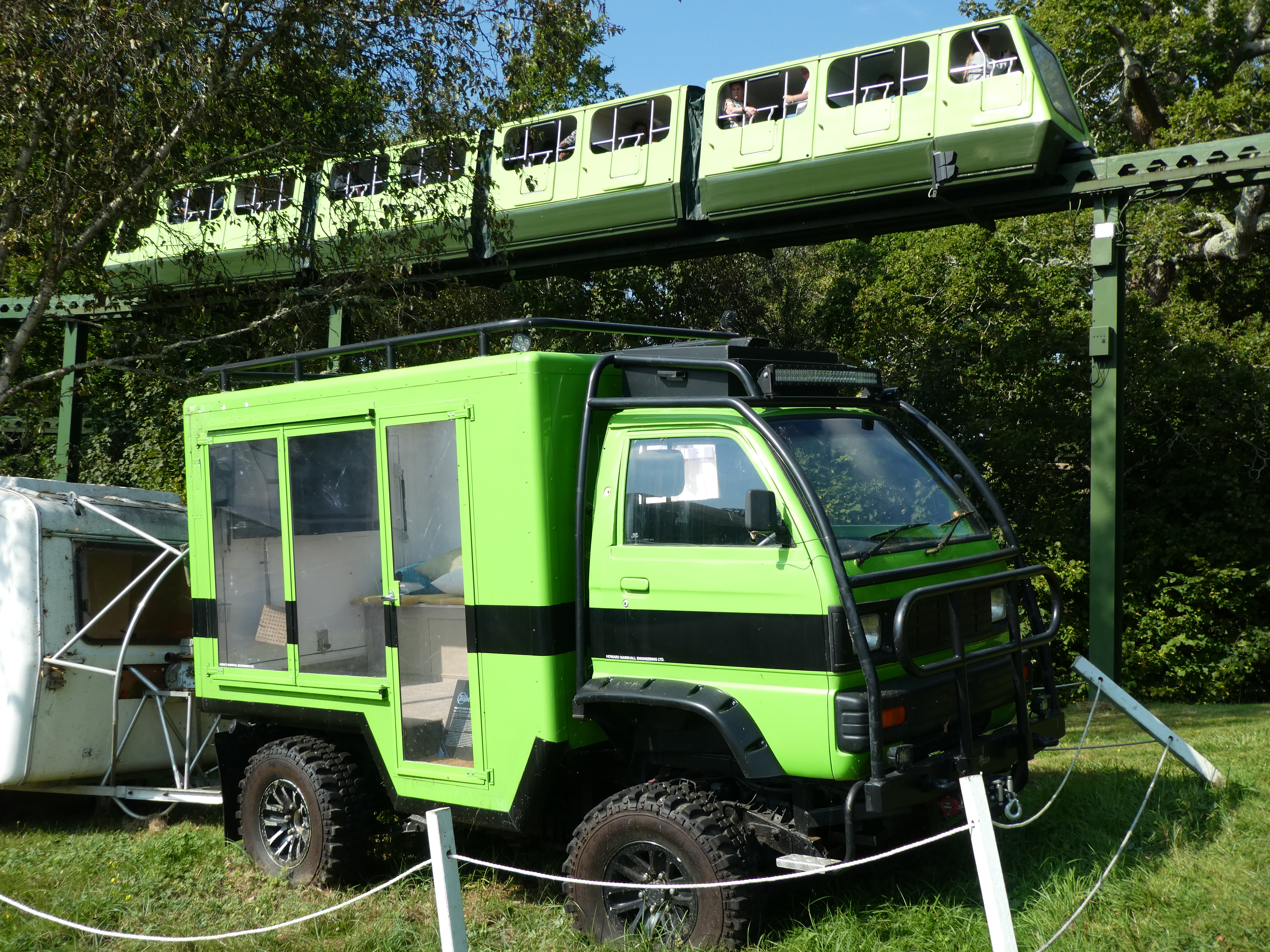
The "Dirty Rascal"

In a bid to beat Land Rover Defender's off-road capabilities with a much lower cost, McGuinness decided to build an off-road vehicle dubbed the "Dirty Rascal", a combination of Daihatsu Fourtrak's powertrain atop a Bedford Rascal bodyshell. He was told to report to the Millbrook Proving Ground. Harris and Flintoff praised the work done to the car and the fact that it only cost £7,000 to build the whole car, amenities included. First, the car was put to the test against two of the cheapest brand new 4x4s available for sale in the UK, the Suzuki Jimny and the Dacia Duster in a timed lap challenge. The Dirty Rascal initially made good progress, but soon stalled. McGuinness headed for Scotland for a 20 kilometer off-road race against a squad of fully-armed former British Special Forces. After getting bogged down by a smoke bomb from the Forces, the Dirty Rascal caught up to the troops by following the nearby river and some gravel tracks; the car arrived just after the Forces.

=== Building an all-terrain, all-electric ice cream van ===
Series Twenty-Nine, Episode Five

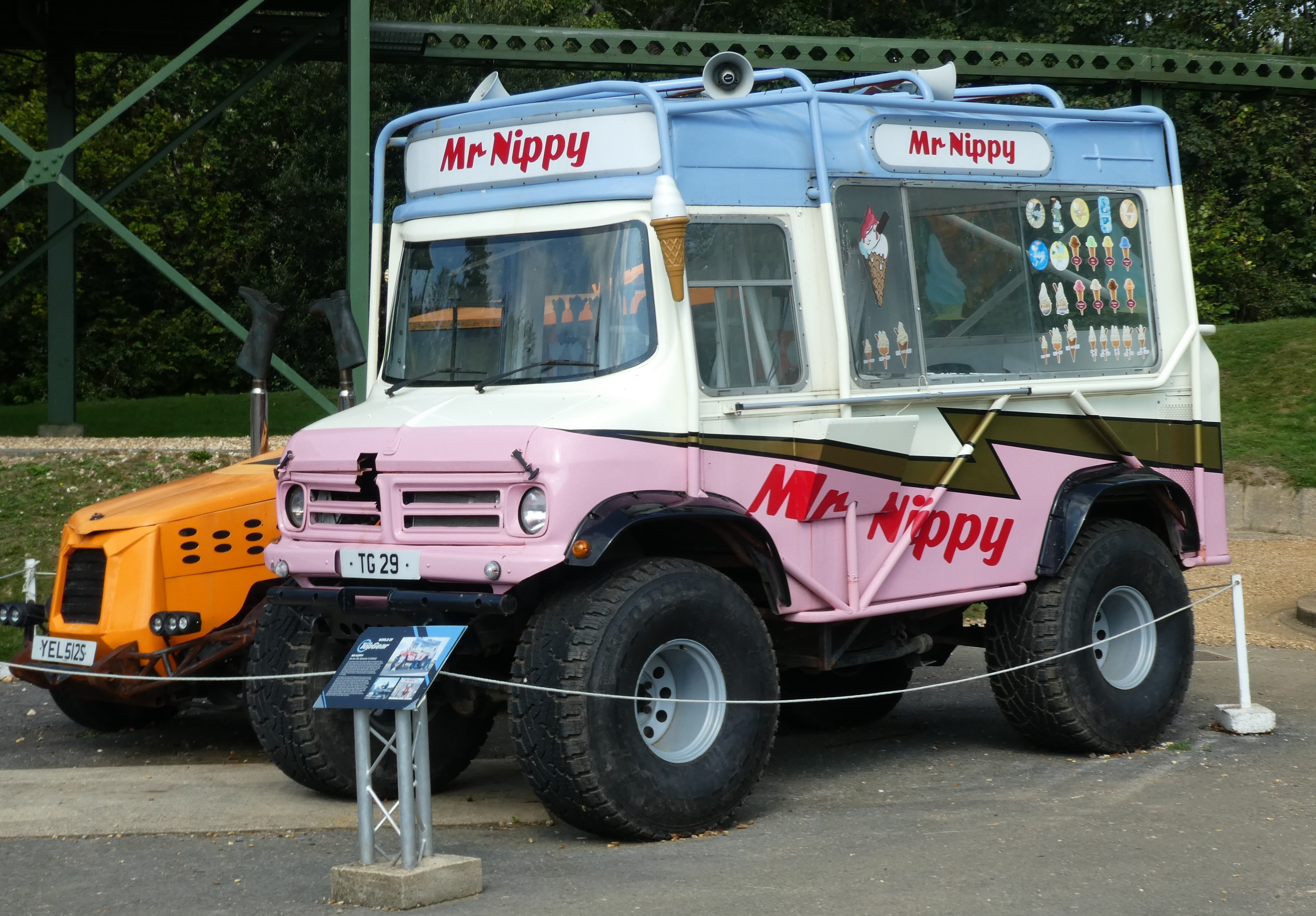
The "Mr Nippy" ice cream van

With ice cream vans losing popularity, McGuinness decided to build an all-terrain, all-electric ice cream van. Joining Harris and Flintoff in Blackpool, he presented his creation, dubbed "Mr Nippy", where McGuinness came up with an idea of serving ice cream for warmer months and a mash cone with pea and gravy for winter. At the beachfront, Mr Nippy was well received by locals, but the producers set a challenge at the local airport against a Whitby Morrison Amalfi (an ice cream van based on a Mercedes-Benz Sprinter): lapping a course in the airport's fire training area while serving 99 Flake ice creams to firefighters. Flintoff, driving the Amalfi, set a time of 2 minutes and 25 seconds; McGuinness's Mr Nippy initially overheated, but managed to clear the course after restarting, despite his 99 flake melting due to the restart, offering them pre-packed ice cream lollies instead. He cleared the course in 5 minutes and 12 seconds. They returned to the seaside and served more ice creams to the locals before making their way to Imber for a paintball competition against a slew of hot food vans, all driven by Flintoff. First, they had to face the burger van, which McGuinness and Harris managed to win. Then, they headed to a simulated train yard for their next round against the fried foods van. After facing the chip van, Harris and McGuinness had to face a team of Flintoff (driving a Citroën HY organic food van) and a Piaggio Ape mobile coffee shop.

=== Obtaining a racing licence ===
Series Thirty One, Episode Four

Flintoff took a driving test to obtain a full-fledged racing licence by enrolling himself in Ginetta's driver development program, known for its notable alumni such as two-time W Series champion Jamie Chadwick and Formula 1 driver Lando Norris. He did the test in a GTA-spec Ginetta G55 in just two days.

On his first day, Flintoff had to deal with wet weather conditions. The next day, Harris checked on him and had a go with the Ginetta, where he went 13 seconds faster than Flintoff's baseline lap time. Eventually, Flintoff managed to close the gap to just 2 seconds behind Harris, at 1 minute and 13 seconds.

Following the test, Flintoff headed to Donington Park for his test, which consisted of two parts: theory and practical tests, which he passed.

During the race day at 2021 GT Cup Championship at Snetterton Circuit, Flintoff qualified two places ahead of the back of the grid and raced alongside Harris as his teammate. In the main race, he managed to impress Harris and Mike (his instructor) before switching drivers; but Flintoff reported that the Ginetta started misfiring at the top two gears, putting their stint to a premature end.

=== Becoming an HGV driver ===
Series Thirty Two, Episode Three

In the midst of HGV crisis caused by a lack of drivers, the presenters decided to become HGV drivers using a fleet of Scania HGVs. They were assigned CB call names; Chopper Hog for Harris, Professor Moose for McGuinness, and Admiral Fiddler for Flintoff.

Their first challenge was a drag race, which Harris won. Next, they had to park their HGVs in designated parking bays. Harris managed to complete the challenge, but McGuinness and Flintoff bickered about their respective parking bays.

Afterwards, having obtained their respective licenses, the presenters went on the road, now using different HGVs: Scania 770S, DAF XG+, and Mercedes-Benz Actros. After stopping at a truck stop, they headed to a RAF base for another series of challenges.

Their first challenge at the base was a precision driving challenge while towing two helicopters with a time penalty imposed if any of the presenters knocked off a pole. The challenge was won by McGuinness due to the Scania's power.

Then, they headed towards South Wales despite a weather warning that Storm Eunice was approaching. After exiting the motorway, they navigated through small towns before reaching the Pembrey Circuit in Wales for their final challenge: truck racing. The presenters were given a couple of laps to get themselves accustomed to the racing trucks and the circuit.

The race started on a reverse-grid system in 15 minute bouts, meaning the presenters started up front. McGuinness spun his truck, causing him to get beached and the race to be red-flagged and restarted after he recovered his truck. In the race, Harris managed to finish in third place.

=== 1920s-style motorsport ===
Series Thirty Two, Episode Five

To celebrate the BBC's centennial anniversary, the presenters discovered what past motorsport was like by participating in a trials race with an Invicta A-Type that McGuinness brought. They cleared the first hill but failed at the next hill, which featured a restart session, prompting a driver change from McGuinness to Harris for the third hill, which Harris managed to clear with a full 25 points.

Next, they arrived at the penultimate hill that featured another restart, where the Invicta failed to do a hill start, netting them only 7 points. Afterwards, after a driver switch to Flintoff, they managed to clear the final hill with another full point.

== Cheap cars ==
The presenters are given a budget to buy a used car conforming to certain criteria. The budget is typically around £1,500, but it has ranged between £100 and £10,000 depending on the type of car. Once purchased, the presenters compete against each other in a series of tests to establish who has bought the best car.

The presenters have no prior knowledge of what the tests will be, although they generally involve:

- A long journey to assess reliability and fuel economy
- A lap round a race track, usually by the Stig, to determine performance. In some cases the Stig sets a time in a similar car and the presenters have to beat it.
- An inspection to discover what is and is not working or how much of the car is original
- Spending leftover cash from the initial budget on repairing and/or modifying the cars
- Selling the cars at the end of the challenge.

All three presenters are highly competitive; vandalism and sabotage are commonplace, and any presenter whose car breaks down during a challenge will typically be abandoned to make their own way to the designated destination. Certain challenges since the African Cheap Car Road Trip have had a back-up car made available for any presenter whose car breaks down and cannot be repaired. The back-up vehicle is generally a model that is loathed by all three presenters or in some other way antagonistic to the current challenge.

Due to the controversial nature of some challenges, it is difficult to gauge who was the most successful, but as a rough guide: May and Clarkson won the most cheap car challenges with seven victories and Hammond won three. Some challenges remain unclear, such as the £10,000 mid-engined Italian supercar challenge, where no presenter actually made it to their destination (although May came the closest to reaching their final destination, Hammond had won all but one of the challenges along the way and was leading on points). The genuine winner of the £1000 police car challenge remains unclear as a result of Hammond eating the final results of Clarkson's Fiat and declaring himself the winner. The presenter who unofficially won the most challenges was Clarkson, with ten. May won eight challenges and Hammond won six.

=== £100 Car challenge ===
Series Four, Episode Three

The presenters were given £100 to buy a car that was road legal (had current tax and a MOT certificate). This was to prove that a car could be purchased and driven from London to Manchester and back again for less than it would cost to take the train (around £180), including the price of the fuel. Clarkson bought a 1988 Volvo 760 GLE, Hammond bought a 1991 Rover 416GTi, and May bought a 1989 Audi 80 1.8E. The challenge included reliability, fuel economy, stopping time, safety, price, and lap-time testing. May's Audi won most of the challenges, but Clarkson was declared overall winner as he bought the Volvo for £1, awarding him 99 points.

=== Cheap Porsche challenge ===
Series Five, Episode Six

The presenters were given £1,500 to buy a Porsche. Clarkson bought a 1983 928, Hammond bought a 1980 924, and May bought a 1984 944. The challenge included driving from London to Brighton, fuel economy, using the car in a lonely-hearts column, lap time, selling the car, and using the change from the £1,500 to modify the cars for judging by the Porsche Owners' Club. Clarkson won the challenge (despite bringing the most unreliable of the three cars) when he earned more by breaking up his car and selling it for parts.

=== Cheap coupés that aren't Porsches challenge ===
Series Six, Episode Two

Following the previous challenge (Note: Clarkson: "We proved that you can't buy a Porsche for £1,500." Hammond: "Well, not if you actually want to go anywhere that is.") the presenters were sent to buy coupes that weren't Porsches for £1,500 and report to Millbrook Proving Ground. Clarkson bought a late-reg "1991" Mitsubishi Starion, Hammond purchased a 1983 BMW 635 CSi, which had a faulty handbrake, and May bought a 1982 Jaguar XJS, which was leaking oil as soon as it arrived.

The first challenge was to see if they could exceed 140 mph. May won by reaching 140, though the Jaguar broke down and had to have its oil and water replaced. The Starion, thanks to a modified turbocharger and some accidental weight shedding, achieved 119 mph, beating the BMW's 115 mph. A test of ride comfort was then carried out; each presenter drove their car at 30 mph over a cobbled road with a bowl of water in their lap, losing points for every ounce spilt. The Jaguar won again, and while Hammond's sporty BMW did poorly, Clarkson fared even worse; the Starion's ride was so hard that the manual gearbox was of no consequence. The Stig then set a lap time for each car on the Alpine testing track, where the Starion narrowly beat the BMW. The Jaguar came last and lost its engine oil again. The three presenters were next asked to drive from Millbrook to the QI club in Oxford; points were awarded for the order of arrival, deducted for breakdowns, and fuel economy was measured. May's Jaguar broke down so many times that he eventually gave up, managing just 8 miles per gallon. Clarkson beat Hammond to the club, albeit with poorer fuel consumption.

The final challenge was an endurance race - each presenter was allowed to modify their car with the money left over from the original purchase. Hammond fitted a home-made bodykit to the BMW. May tried to paint the Jaguar in British racing green (only to run out of paint) and spent the rest fixing the engine. Clarkson had a more professional paint job, and installed an even more powerful turbo. While Clarkson's new turbo made the Mitsubishi the fastest car in the entire race, the engine repeatedly overheated and broke down after almost every lap, before one last blow up put him out for good. Hammond's gearbox failed in the final stages of the race, but he still beat May by two laps (although the Jaguar suffered wear during the race, it only broke down once when the brake fluid overheated). Winner: May (Clarkson by agreement) (Note: On points, May narrowly beat Hammond in the challenge, but Clarkson then attempted to claim victory by pointing out the Starion had been superior until the endurance race. May and Hammond acknowledged this, saying that the only problem with the Starion had been Clarkson's modifications. So they offered Clarkson the win if he admitted that, 'you're a clot and you ruined your car', which he did.)

=== Italian mid-engined supercars for less than a second-hand Mondeo challenge ===
Series Seven, Episode Four

The presenters were given £10,000 to buy a 1970s supercar, which had to be mid-engined and Italian, and told to report to Bristol. Clarkson bought a 1974 Maserati Merak, (he believed it the more powerful SS model, only to discover during the challenges that it was a regular Merak with a £38 SS badge instead). Hammond purchased a 1979 Ferrari 308 GT4 (which at the time had a 1983 reg in error) and May found a 1974 Lamborghini Urraco afflicted by electrical problems. The challenges included a lap of the Castle Combe Circuit, changing the oil and sparkplugs of their cars and driving from Chippenham to a "gentlemen's club" in Slough on a set amount of fuel. Hammond won most of the challenges, and May's Urraco was a constant source of problems due to its poor electrics - it arrived in Bristol on the back of a tow truck, and broke down on almost every leg of the trip. The Merak began to deteriorate at Castle Combe, due to having terrible brakes and an engine that began making noises alongside poor performance. It was later revealed in a rolling road challenge that it was only producing 80 bhp. Clarkson initially blamed the sound on the tappets, but as the day progressed, May declared that the engine was disintegrating. None of the cars survived the final journey to the finishing point at Spearmint Rhino. The Merak's engine exploded, showering the Urraco in pieces of the wreckage and forcing Clarkson to crash into a hedge, due to its brakes not working without a running engine. The Ferrari appeared to run out of fuel ten miles from Slough, although Hammond later admitted that the entire electrical system had failed. Finally, the Urraco ran out of fuel on the outskirts of Slough, just one mile from the finish, causing a major traffic jam. The presenters therefore unanimously declared that the scores were useless and Clarkson summarised with "yes, you can buy a mid-engined Italian supercar for less than £10,000, but for the love of God, don't!" No winner was declared.

The GT4 used in this challenge was later bought and repaired by Hammond, only to be damaged again when he was in the Petrolheads, where he was tricked and rammed during a challenge.

=== Man with a van challenge ===
Series Eight, Episode Eight

As a followup from a previous challenge and as punishment for the useless reviews of the vans tested, the presenters were given £1,000 to buy a van and face a series of challenges. Clarkson, following Hammond's original strategy of buying a simple van, bought a 1992 Ford Transit, while May chose a 1999 LDV Convoy box van for its considerable storage. Hammond arrived last with a 1994 Suzuki Super Carry, claiming that as it was mid-engined it was essentially a supercar.

The tests began with a drag race; Hammond won easily, Clarkson came second, and May last. They then performed a race to see how long it took to load and unload various items (each presenter was given an illegal immigrant). May had little trouble loading his van, but had an uncooperative immigrant. Clarkson, who continually moaned about his aversion to manual labour, threw most of his items into the Transit. He then wrongfooted May by parking just behind the LDV to stop it unloading. Clarkson consequently won, while Hammond lost as a result of falling far behind due to the comparatively small storage space of the Suzuki.

The third challenge was tailgating a passenger car as closely as possible. Due to the Suzuki's flat front, Hammond came close to a centimetre. Clarkson crashed the Transit into the back of the car and May's LDV was unable to catch up to the target car. The presenters were told to replace their driver's side doors. Hammond and May were able to remove their doors easily, while Clarkson rammed his off with the LDV. He then used tape to fix a new door on, while Hammond successfully fitted his with bolts; May eventually ran out of time. The fifth challenge tested how long a burglar took to break into the rear door of each van; the burglar failed to open Hammond's, smashed open May's in half a minute, but took only ten seconds to break into the Transit. Finally, the presenters were tasked with outrunning a police patrol car driven by the Stig on their test track. Clarkson won the event, which also featured a roll-over by Hammond trying to achieve the Scandinavian flick while going round the first corner. Hammond still won the overall challenge.

=== US Special - Used American car for $1000 challenge ===
Series Nine, Episode Three

The presenters wanted to find out if it was easier to buy a car for a holiday rather than hire one, so they were each given a budget of US$1000 to purchase a car, which they took on a road trip across four US states, from Miami, Florida to New Orleans, Louisiana. Clarkson bought a 1989 Chevrolet Camaro, May got a 1989 Cadillac Brougham Sedan, while Hammond bought a 1991 Dodge Ram pick-up truck.

During their journey they were given a series of challenges, which included the cars being driven around a track by The Stig's overweight "American cousin," doing 0 to 50 to 0 without over-running the track and thereby crashing into a river full of alligators, and camping a night in a field eating only roadkill. They also had to paint slogans on each other's car in order to get them shot at or arrested as they drove across Alabama. When the three pulled into a petrol station to refuel, the station's owner called a gang and attacked them and their film crew with stones and chased them out of town, because of the slogans (they weren't helped any when May needed a jumpstart before he could attempt his escape from the gang).

Upon arrival at New Orleans, the three presenters found the city was taking a long time to recover from Hurricane Katrina and could not bring themselves to ask for money for their cars. Instead, they gave them away to people who needed them. In the episode's credits, the presenters were credited as "Cletus Clarkson", "Earl Hammond JR", "Ellie May May" and "Roscoe P. Stig". All of the other credited crew had their first names changed to "Billy Bob". Clarkson declared himself the winner and May as the loser (as he could not even give his car away).

=== £1,500 two-wheel drive African cross-country car challenge ===
Series Ten, Episode Four

The presenters were sent to Botswana to buy a car that was not an off-road vehicle and had only two-wheel drive, which they would drive across the country from the eastern border of Zimbabwe to the western border of Namibia (approximately 1,000 miles). The challenge included a drive over the Makgadikgadi Pan, which left Clarkson and May's cars filled with dust after they had been stripped of excess weight to prevent their cars sinking through the thin surface, and over the Okavango Delta. This was to prove "to the people of Surrey that they don't need 4×4s in case there are leaves on the road." This challenge introduced a new rule that stipulated that if any of the presenters' cars broke down beyond repair, they would have to complete the journey in a substitute vehicle - for this challenge, a Volkswagen Beetle. Clarkson bought a 1981 Lancia Beta Coupé, which was the most unreliable car. Hammond bought a 1963 Opel Kadett, which he named Oliver, while May bought a 1985 Mercedes-Benz 230E. Hammond felt such affection for his car that he subsequently had it shipped to the UK, where it had the occasional cameo on Richard Hammond's Blast Lab. Oliver was Hammond's "prized possession" in the Top Gear 'Lorryist' challenge. All three made it to the Namibian border. Clarkson declared the Beetle as the winner, since it had no documented mishaps during the trip.

=== British Leyland did make some good cars after all challenge ===
Series Ten, Episode seven

In an argument with the producers of Top Gear, the presenters claimed that British Leyland did produce some good cars despite being on strike most of the time and not producing cars at all. They were given a budget of £1,200, of their own money, to buy a British Leyland in which they would face a series of challenges to earn their money back. These mostly took place at the MIRA proving ground, though the last one was at the Top Gear test track, where they tried to see how much of the track they could complete whilst their cars were full of water (earning one pound for every five yards they travel). Hammond went over the budget to get a 1974 Triumph Dolomite Sprint for £1,250, Clarkson got a 1981 Rover 3500 SE for £1,100, which consequently lost two doors in unrelated incidents (one was during the 'water test' after only ten yards), and May spent £1,000 and acquired a 1978 Princess 2200. The boys also reproduced the intro of Money from the various squeaks and clunks that their cars made. After all the challenges, Clarkson totalled up the money and declared May the winner of the challenge, as not only did he get back all that he had paid (largely from the strength of his 'water test' travelling 4,500 yards), he made a £20 profit.

=== Make a police car for a lot less money than the real police spend on their cars challenge ===
Series Eleven, Episode One

The presenters were all given £1,000 to buy a car and turn them into police cars able to surpass the Police's standard-issue Vauxhall Astra Diesels. Clarkson bought a 1998 Fiat Coupé 20V Turbo for £900, painted it in Italian Polizia di Stato livery (although the colour was wrong) and fitted it with "Boudicea" wheel covers. May bought a 1994 Lexus LS400 for £900, which he painted in a traditional 'jam sandwich' livery, fitted with a siren from an ice cream van, and armed with paint sprayers at the back. Hammond bought a 1994 Suzuki Vitara for £750 and equipped it with light bars and a self-deploying stinger on the front (made of several doormats stitched together with nails poking through). The presenters' cars were then put to test around the Top Gear track, which included beating the Stig's lap in the Vauxhall Astra diesel, clearing a crash site in less than two minutes, and then stopping the Stig in a police chase (the latter driving a BMW 7-Series) "Without using £125,000 worth of Volvo, the RAF, and 16 health and safety forms." The real police first demonstrated how to stop the stolen car using four Volvo V70 estates, boxing in the car to the side of the road, following the fulfillment of "13 separate health and safety criteria." All three cars were subsequently displayed at the British Motor Show 2008. The winner was Hammond. (Note: During the results, Hammond claimed that Clarkson got 98 points (if he had 100 he would win the challenge), and eating the paper saying Clarkson had "98 points," suggesting Hammond was hiding something. Clarkson claimed "Since I am not prepared to go through your stools in the morning, we have to conclude that the best car for the British police is a Suzuki Vitara with a doormat on the front.")

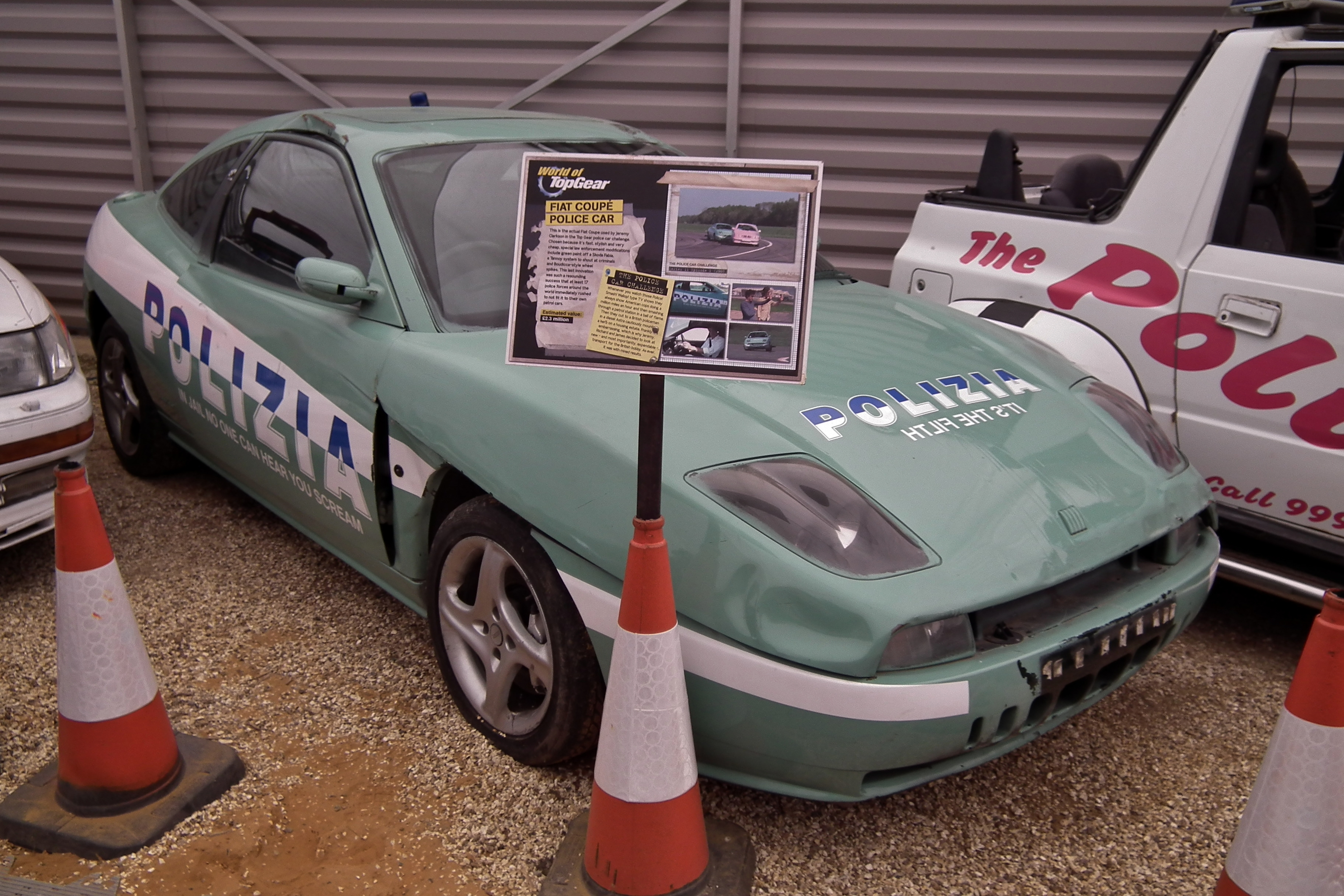
Jeremy Clarkson's Fiat Coupé

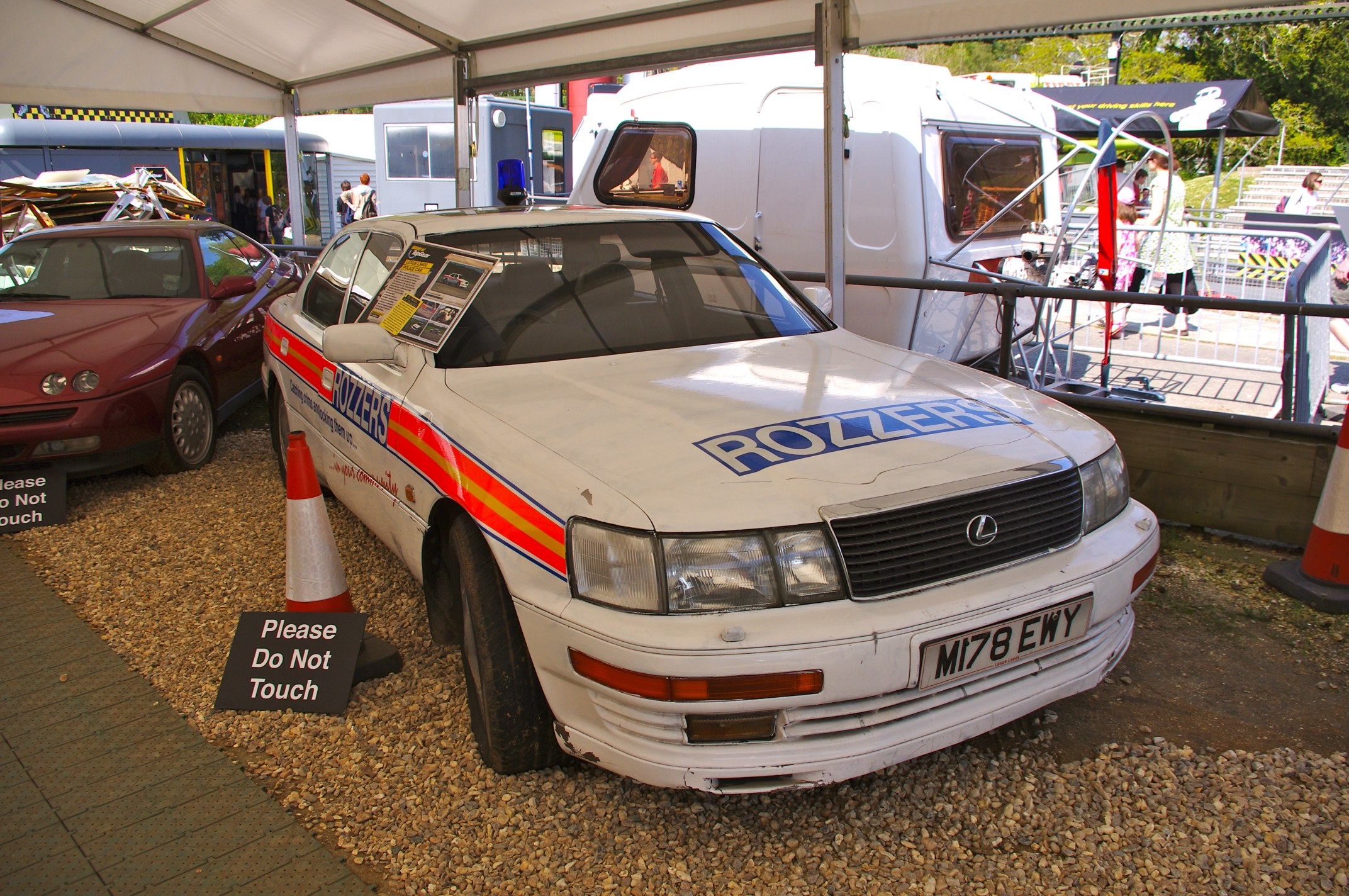
James May's Lexus LS400

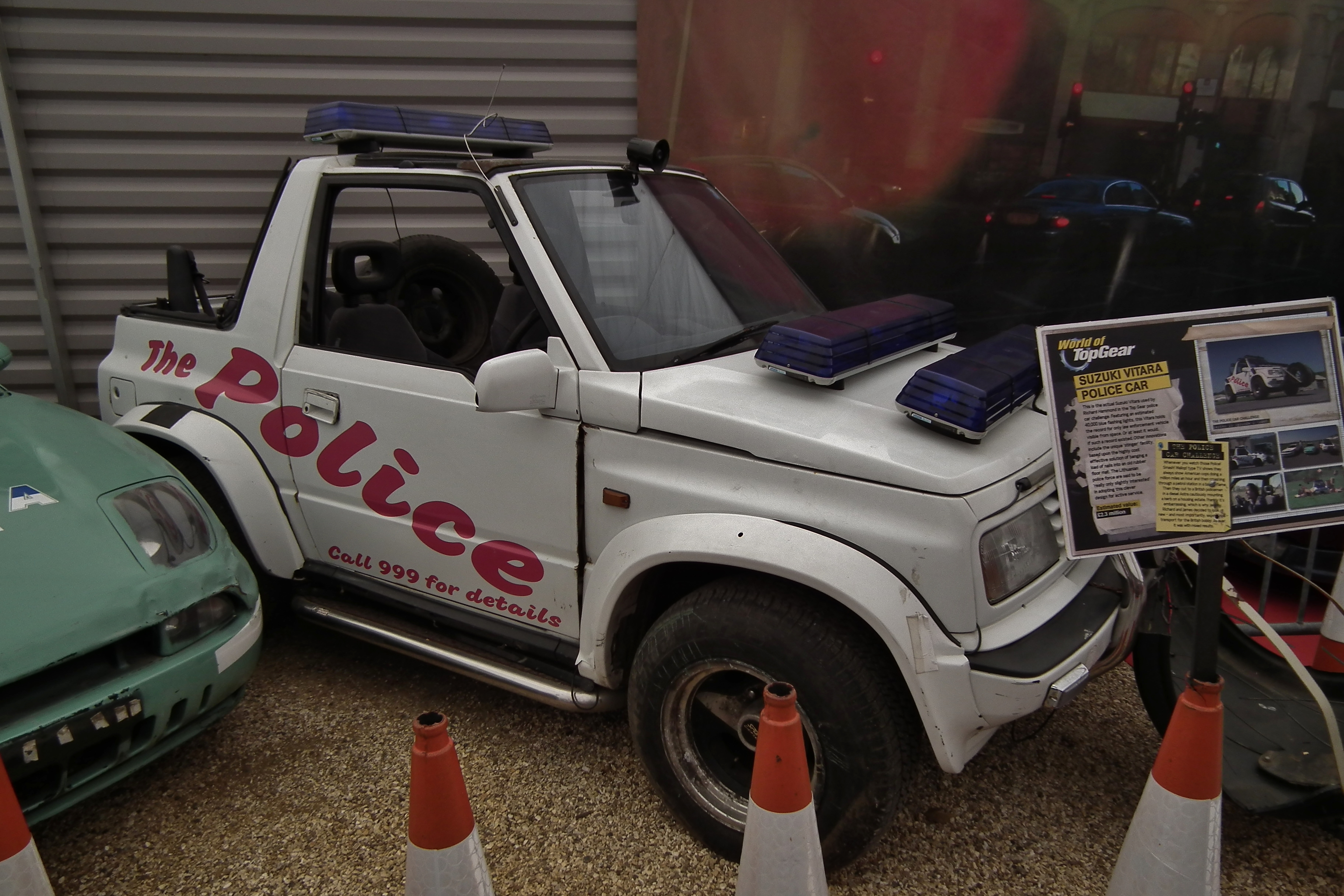
Richard Hammond's Suzuki Vitara

=== Can you buy an Alfa Romeo for £1000 or less without it completely ruining your life all the time? challenge ===
Series Eleven, Episode Three

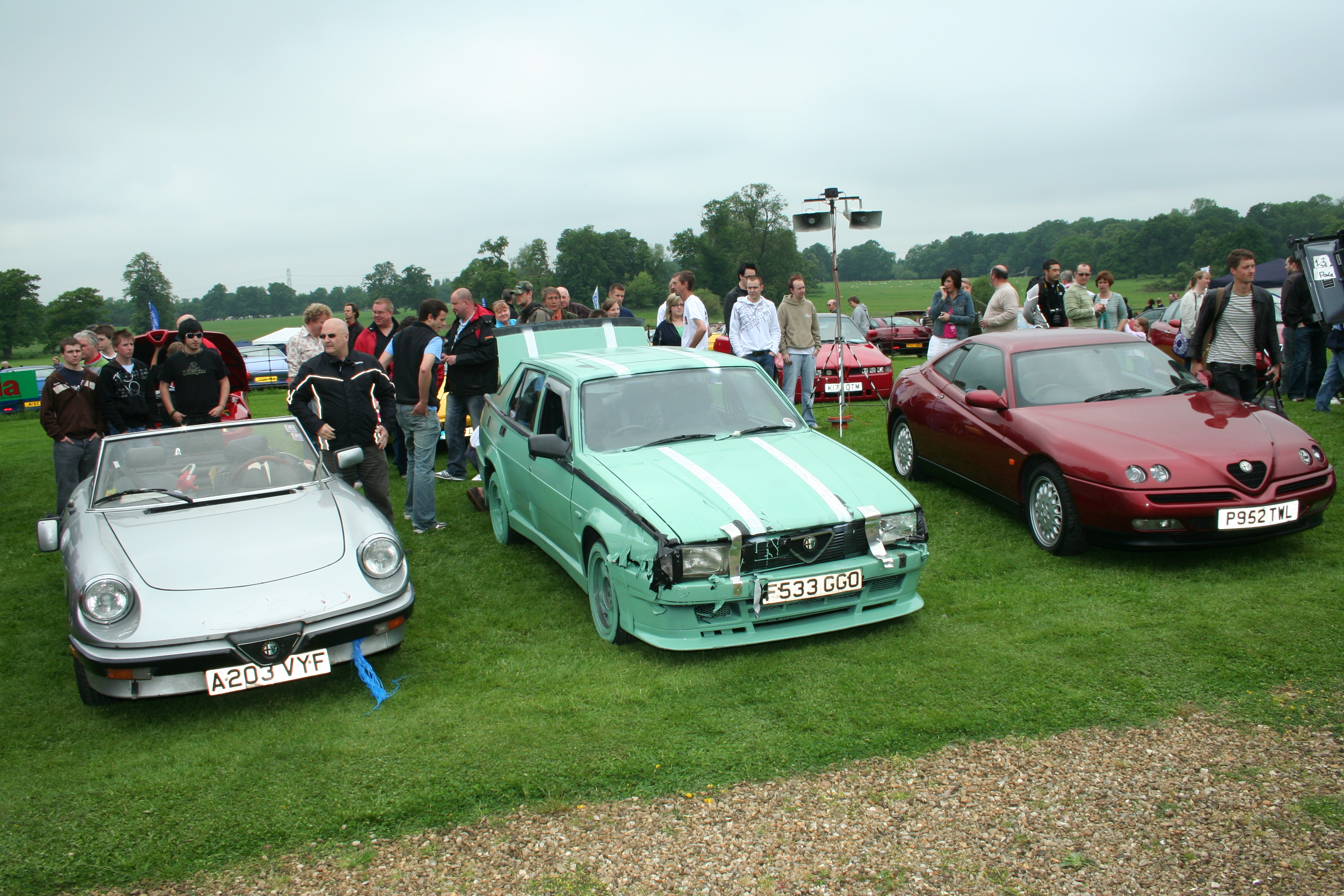
The presenters' Alfas when the challenge ended. From left to right, Hammond's Spider, Clarkson's 75 and May's GTV.

The presenters were challenged with proving to the show's producers that in order to be a true "petrol head" it is necessary to have owned an Alfa Romeo. They were each given £1,000 to buy their own Alfa Romeo. Clarkson bought a 1989 Alfa Romeo 75 3.0 V6 (for £450), Hammond bought a 1984 Alfa Romeo Spider 2.0 (for £1,000), and May bought a 1996 Alfa Romeo GTV 2.0 TwinSpark (for £995). The cars were put to a series of tests, which included participating in a track day on the Rockingham Motor Speedway road course, featuring their cars on a calendar which they must sell at a newsstand, and lastly entering an Alfa Romeo exclusive Concours d'Elegance event, traveling as far as 80 miles to reach the event.

At the race circuit, the presenters were to gain a point for every car they overtook and lose a point each time they were overtaken. As the field consisted predominately of high-end sports and supercars, none of the presenters managed to overtake any competitors. Clarkson rolled his car attempting to overtake a Ford Focus.

In a side challenge, each presenter had to create a calendar featuring their car which was to be sold at a newsstand. None of the presenters' calendars managed to sell a single copy.

After the track day, the presenters had to prep their cars for a Concours d'Elegance competition. Clarkson decided to respray his car in Skoda Green, a colour he used on his Fiat Coupe in the Police Car Challenge. May meticulously cleaned his car, removing all the dust from the interior and bodywork, and Hammond re-upholstered his seats using Clarkson's leather jacket.

During the journey to the Concours, Hammond had to manually send coolant into his engine using a hand cranked pump (due to a broken water pump during the track day challenge). This eventually broke and his engine seized, forcing May to tow him. After crashing into May a few times, May got fed up and abandoned him. Clarkson helped to tow Hammond despite his gearbox nearing the end of its life, and the two sabotaged May's engine bay with cheese. After the judges finished, James was awarded 74 out of a possible 150 points while Jeremy and Richard were given 23.5 and 9 respectively - the lowest scores in Concours history.

Clarkson was declared the overall victory (largely due to the car's low price), which pleased him greatly as it was his first victory in three years for a cheap car challenge.

=== Mercedes-Benz 600 vs Rolls-Royce Corniche Coupé challenge ===
Series Eleven, Episode Five

Clarkson and May attempted to find out which of their classic luxury limousines—Clarkson's 1969 Mercedes-Benz 600 "Grosser" or May's 1972 Rolls-Royce Corniche—was better. They brought their cars to the Top Gear Test Track for a series of challenges. This was not a real "Cheap Car Challenge", as Hammond did not participate, the presenters owned the cars prior to the challenge, and neither car was particularly cheap. They summarised the choice as "...between 'Camp' and 'Camp Commandant'..." based on the previous owners of the vehicles they were using in the challenge. No winner was declared.

=== How much lorry do you get for £5000 challenge ===
Series Twelve, Episode One

Unable to understand why lorry-driving can be so difficult, the presenters each bought a second-hand lorry for under £5,000. May bought a Scania P94D, Clarkson bought a Renault Magnum and Hammond bought an ERF EC11. Clarkson painted his lorry black, resulting in multiple visibility problems (because he also painted 2/3 of the windscreen black). Hammond tried to Americanise his lorry by attaching a dog kennel to the front. May attached many flowers and decorations to make it look like an Indian lorry. After decorating their lorries, they were sent to Millbrook Proving Ground, where the first challenge was to successfully powerslide their lorries on a skid pan (as demonstrated by "The Stig's Lorry-driving Cousin"). None were successful; May's mudguard fell off, Clarkson got his "gear lever up his arse", while Hammond's dog kennel fell off.

After several attempts at attaching trailers, the second challenge involved driving round the Alpine handling course in the fastest time possible with their trailers loaded with various awkward loads (Hammond an unsecured Nissan Micra, May a wedding cake, and Clarkson hay bales and an electric fire). Hammond was left far behind as he was unable to get his lorry in gear, and Clarkson took the lead until he forgot to change down for a steep hill and stalled. May broadsided him on as he passed, causing the brakes to become jammed on. A victorious May discovered his wedding cake had toppled over, while Hammond drove so violently his car fell out of the lorry. After fixing his brakes, Clarkson arrived last with his trailer on fire.

The next challenge featured the lorries speed limiters removed in a race around the two-mile bowl of Millbrook to see which was fastest; Hammond won with his lightweight ERF hitting 90 miles an hour. The fourth test had each presenter attempt to perform a hill start with their vehicles, and to encourage them, prized possessions were placed behind each of their lorries. Jeremy, with his drum kit placed behind his lorry, was successful as his vehicle had a crawler gear, although May and Hammond promptly ran over and smashed the drum kit. Oliver, Hammond's restored Opel Kadett from the Botswana adventure, was placed behind his lorry and he eventually forfeited rather than risk crushing it. May's grand piano was smashed when he failed to prevent his lorry from rolling backwards, although the production crew had already damaged it while positioning it.

The final challenge, for speed, braking, and toughness had each presenter driving their vehicles through an obstacle at 56 miles an hour and the winner going the shortest distance after hitting it. Hammond managed to stop his lorry in a shorter distance after driving through a mobile home than May did after driving through a structure built out of six hundred water coolers. Clarkson travelled the shortest distance, but was injured after driving his lorry through a brick wall. Each of the presenters complained that they had not received the best obstacle. At the end, the "hopelessly complicated" scores were tallied and May was declared the winner.

=== Vietnam Special ===
Series Twelve, Episode Eight

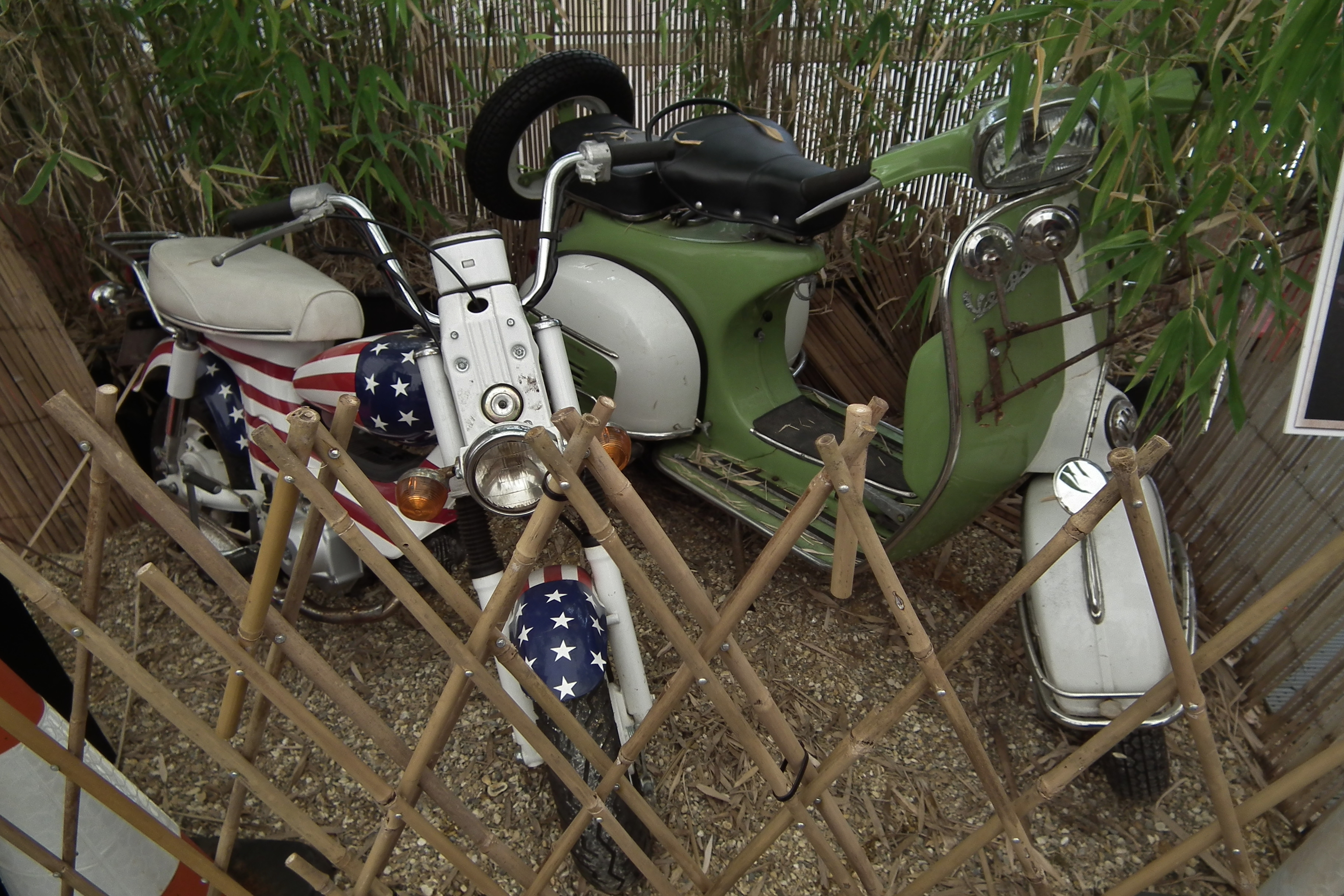
Clarkson's Vespa (right) and the "backup" Honda Chaly (left) used in the Vietnam Special

The three presenters went on a trip to Vietnam where they were each given 15 million Vietnamese đồng (about US$900) to buy a "set of wheels" able to drive 1,000 miles from Ho Chi Minh City in the south to Halong Bay in the north. Due to the car prices and the money they were given, the task was completed using cheap motorbikes. The goal was essentially to do in eight days what the Americans failed to do in the ten years of the Vietnam War.

As in previous challenges, the producers provided a replacement vehicle to any presenter whose vehicle broke down, in this challenge a Honda minibike decorated in a stars and Stripes livery with Born in the USA by Bruce Springsteen playing on an iPod (redubbed with The Star-Spangled Banner in some versions), causing much distress to the presenters due to the Vietnam War with America.

Upon reaching Ha Long, the presenters were given the task of modifying their bikes to reach a floating bar. Clarkson and Hammond reached the bar on their bike-boats. May's sank and he finished by swimming to the bar. Clarkson emerged victorious by reaching the bar first.

=== Safe, interesting cars for 17-year-olds that can be insured challenge ===
Series Thirteen, Episode Two

With a budget of £2,500 each including insurance, the three bought cars that were "ideal" for 17-year-olds. Clarkson bought a 1995 Volvo 940 estate, Hammond a 1993 Hyundai Scoupe and May a 1994 Volkswagen Golf Mk III. They were then given a series of challenges, including driving across a field after a rave, parking cars at night (May lost this challenge due to Clarkson sabotaging his stereo system), and an obstacle course in which each presenter had to drive round the course and hit as many of the obstacles as they could. The winner was Clarkson.

=== Seek petrolhead heaven in three £1500 rear-wheel drive coupes ===
Series Thirteen, Episode Five

With a budget of £1,500, Clarkson, May and Hammond had to buy a rear wheel drive car. Clarkson bought a 1991 Porsche 944, May bought a 1983 Ford Capri (but switched to the 1977 Morris Marina backup car after the Ford broke down) and Hammond bought a 1991 Nissan 300ZX. They faced numerous challenges including trying to beat a one-minute, 32.31 second lap time set by a Renault Twingo, and accelerating to 60 mph and then braking to 0 mph within 200 metres or risk destroying something belonging to them. May ended up destroying another one of his pianos. As a finale, they participated in an Andros Trophy ice race (which included F1 driver Olivier Panis) against heavily modified hatchbacks. They were lapped several times. May emerged victorious (mainly due to Hammond and Clarkson duelling throughout the race,) in the Morris Marina, which had a piano dropped on it in the end. This was the only occasion during Clarkson, Hammond and May's time on the show that the "backup car" had to be used.

=== Buy a pre-1982 car and modify it for a rally in Mallorca for less than £3,000 ===
Series Thirteen, Episode Six

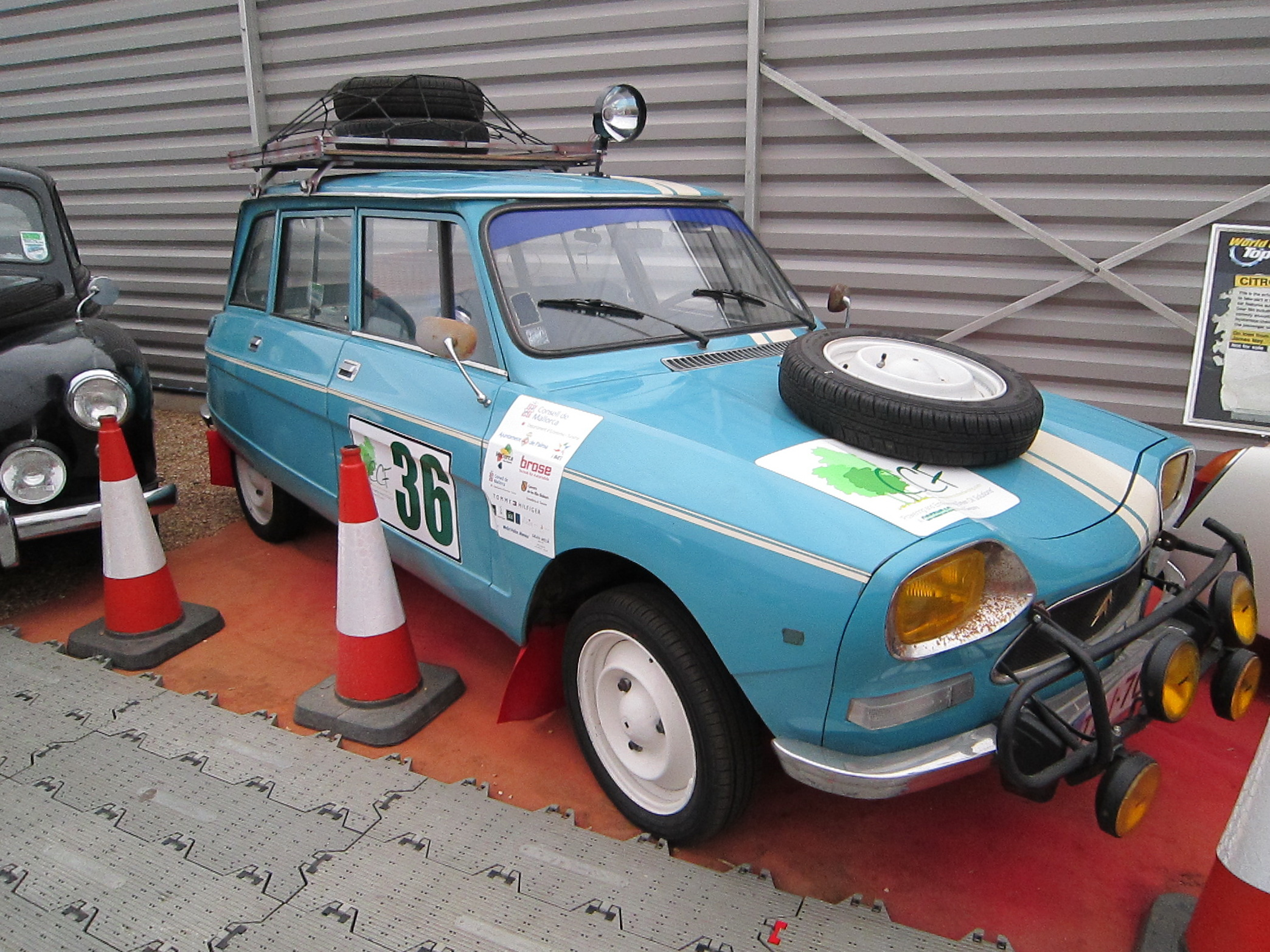
May's Citroën Ami

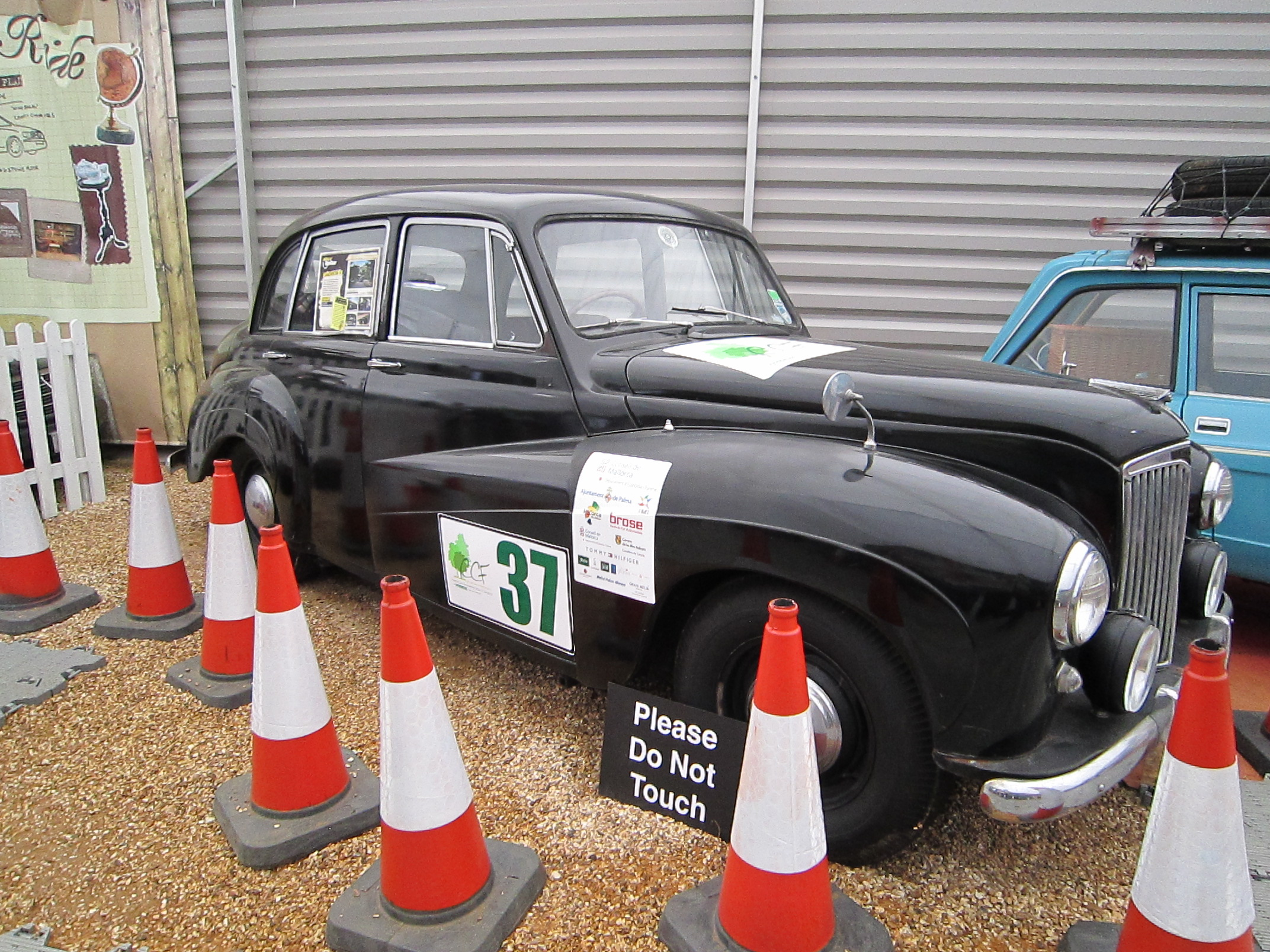
Hammond's Lanchester LJ 200

The three were told to go to a car auction and buy any car for less than £3,000 that was built before 1982. Clarkson came close to buying a Ford Cortina, but bought a 1969 Austin-Healey Sprite convertible. He accidentally used some of his own money to buy it, as he bought it for £3,600. Hammond "went ugly early" and bought the first lot, a 1953 £1000 Lanchester LJ 200. May was set to buy a Bristol, which went over his budget in bidding, and because there was only one car after the Bristol he was forced to buy the last car of the auction—a £1500 1977 blue Citroën Ami 8 Estate. They were then told to go to Mallorca for a rally, with two challenges spread over two days. They were introduced to their co-drivers by the producers. Clarkson was given the head of Balearic Rallying Club, who spoke no English. Hammond was assigned Brian Wheeler, a sarcastic dwarf mechanic. May was given glamour model and Page 3 girl Madison Welch.

Upon arriving in Mallorca, the presenters discovered that they were almost two days late for the rally, which was a five-day event, and thus had no chance of winning. They chose to bet £25 on whichever one of them had the best score at the end of the rally. Clarkson's malfunctioning gauges made calculating his speed difficult, May had to cope with Welch's initial lack of interest and navigating experience, and Hammond's Lanchester proved unreliable, breaking down several times per stage and overheating constantly. While Clarkson was in the lead heading into the final day, May posted the most consistent lap times at the regularity track day and edged out Clarkson in the final challenge. After the challenge it was revealed that all three presenters liked their chosen cars so much they had bought them from the BBC.

=== Bolivia Special ===
Series Fourteen, Episode Six

The three presenters travelled 1,000 miles through the rainforests of Bolivia to the Pacific coast of Chile. They used pre-owned off-road vehicles, bought in Bolivia (unseen via the internet) for less than £3,500 each. Hammond bought a tan Toyota Land Cruiser, which had been converted into a soft top convertible by a previous owner. Despite the car's reputation for durability, it turned out to be the most unreliable car, suffering multiple drivetrain and suspension breakdowns. It was damaged beyond repair on the sand-dune descent. Hammond nicknamed his Land Cruiser "Donkey." Clarkson bought a red Range Rover, which he believed had a 3.9-litre fuel-injected engine. However, when he showed his co-presenters under the bonnet, May noted it had carburettors, making it the older 3.5-litre model. Overall Clarkson's Range Rover turned out to be the most reliable, despite the car's reputation. May bought a red (although "..in the advert it was blue...") Suzuki Samurai with a 1.3-litre engine, which was the smallest of the three vehicles. Despite this, May made no modifications and it had the fewest breakdowns. One of the Suzuki's disadvantages was its open differentials, which until fixed made it "three-wheel drive".

=== A track day car which is as good in the real world ===
Series Fifteen, Episode Two

The three were sent to Germany and given a budget of £5,000 to buy a four-door saloon that would be as good in the real world as it would be on a track day. May bought a 1986 Mercedes-Benz 190E 2.3-16v Cosworth, Hammond a 1996 E36 BMW M3, and Clarkson a 1989 Ford Sierra Sapphire RS Cosworth. Challenges included determining their cars' top speed on an unregulated autobahn, interior space (by carrying a German Oompah band), and an ADAC test. The BMW initially performed well until it came last in the evaluation test, revealing badly repaired accident damage. Finally, the presenters went to a circuit, where the cars were lapped by the Stig's German cousin. Two unbroadcast challenges gave points for each viewing of a track day video uploaded to YouTube, and an economy run. The last test was based on price - each pound under the budget received one point - meaning that the £4,999 Sierra and the £3,990 M3 lost to the £2,990 190E. May was the winner.

=== Campervan challenge ===
Series Fifteen, Episode Four

Bemoaning the fact that campervans are either huge American style motor homes unsuitable for European roads or tiny and cramped European models, the presenters were challenged to construct inexpensive campervans that would be comfortable to sleep in yet manageable on narrow, twisting European roads. They had to have a sleeping area, a toilet and a cooking area. Clarkson constructed a three-storey Bauhaus inspired campervan on a 1988 Citroën CX chassis. May attached a roofbox with a sleeping bag on top of a 1987 Lotus Excel and Hammond constructed a collapsible cottage on the back of a 1984 Land Rover 110. Clarkson found his Citroën difficult to drive and nearly toppled over several times. May's Lotus was cramped and Hammond's design was cumbersome and impractical. Challenges included driving to a camp ground in Polzeath, Cornwall, changing into a wet suit inside the campervan, sleeping, 'going to the bog' in their campervans, and cooking a meal. During the meal challenge, Richard set fire to his cottage. Later, the three took a trip to a beauty spot in Hartland in North Devon where Hammond and May 'accidentally' rolled Jeremy's Citroën over a cliff. Back in the studio, Clarkson protested but all three presenters reluctantly came to the conclusion that although James had the fewest problems with his campervan (the only one being space), all of their designs were rubbish. No winner was declared.

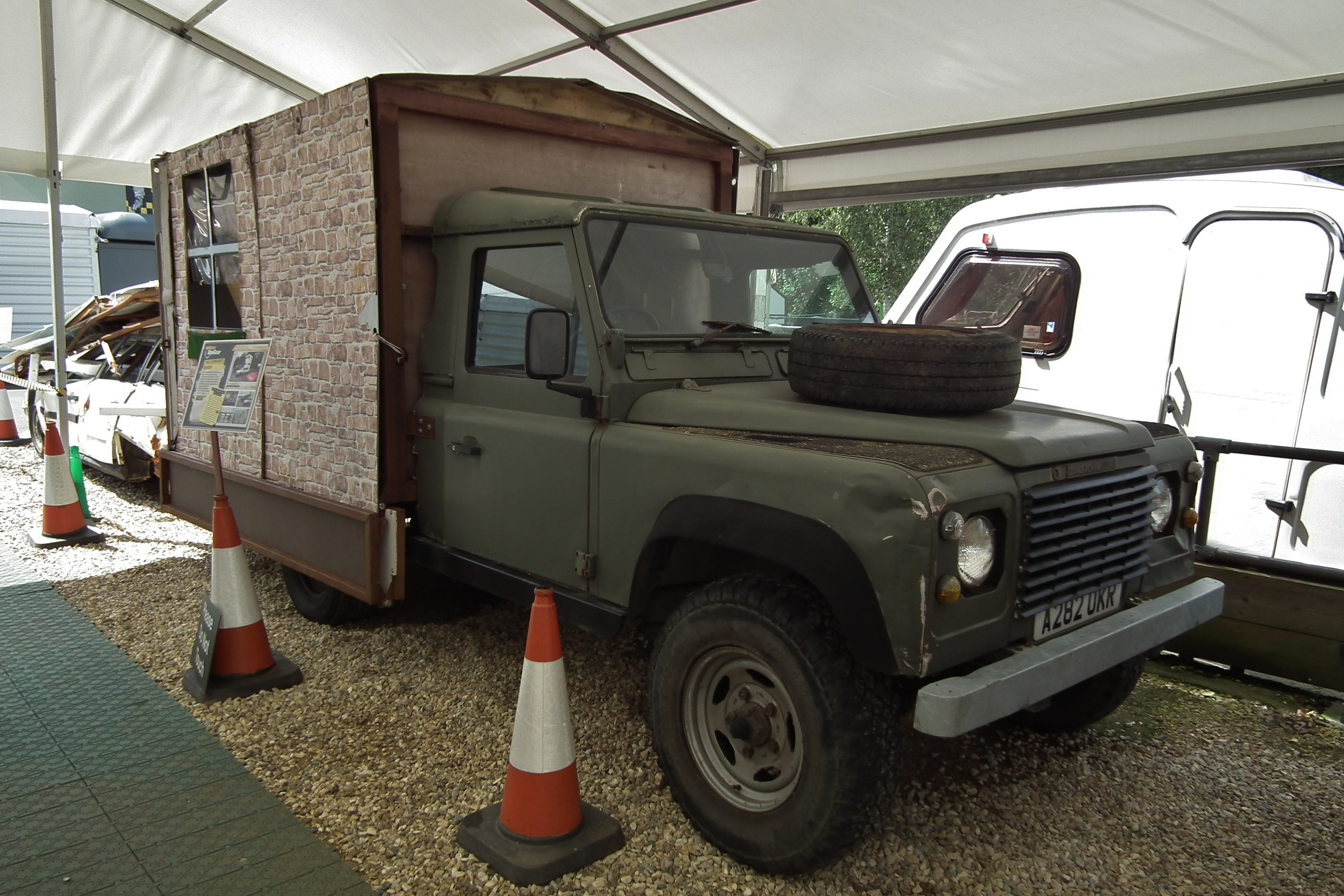
Hammond's Land Rover 110

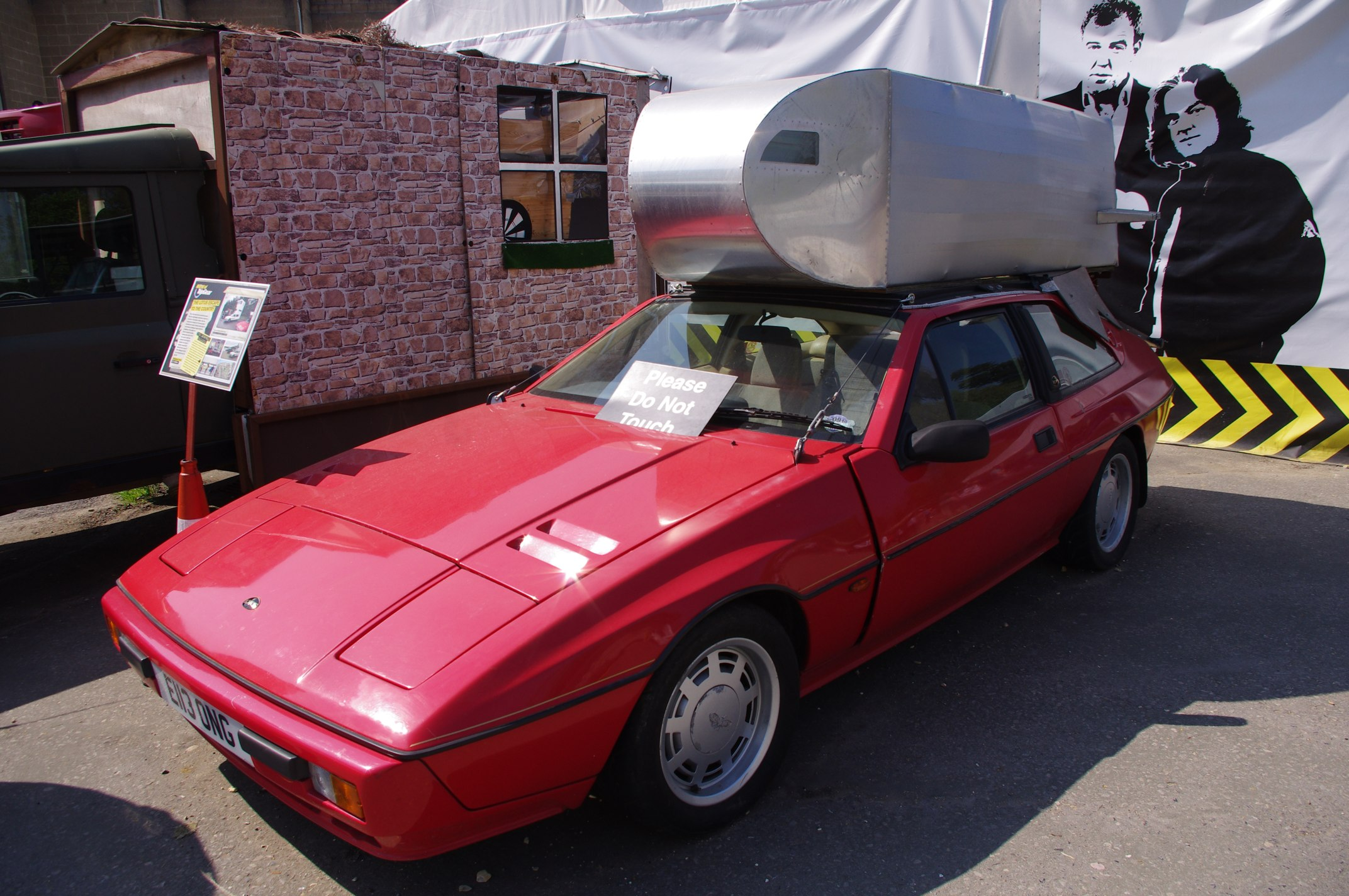
May's Lotus Excel

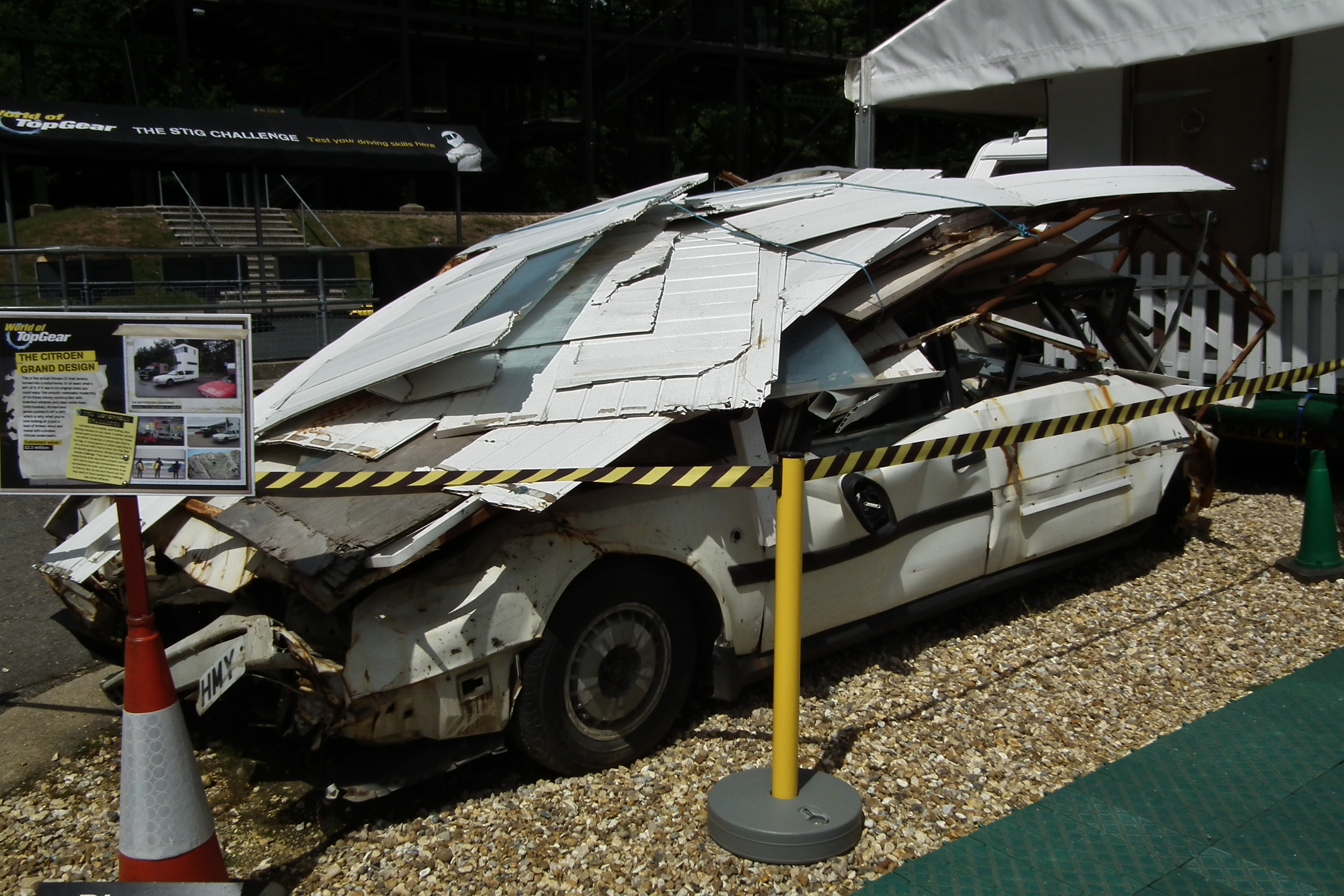
Clarkson's destroyed Citroën CX

=== British Sports Car challenge ===
Series Fifteen, Episode Six

The presenters attempted to prove that old British sports cars never deserved to be killed off by the hot hatch. Clarkson bought a 1974 Jensen-Healey, May bought a 1989 TVR S2 and Hammond bought a 1994 Lotus M100 Elan. The trip involved going to the places where all their cars were 'born', beginning at the Lotus factory in Norfolk, then onto the Jensen factory in West Bromwich, before finishing at the TVR factory in Blackpool. There was no winner, as the team said that all of their cars were the best.

=== Middle East Special ===
Series Sixteen, Episode Two

The three were given £3,500 to buy a two-door convertible sports car, find their way to the birthplace of Jesus, and provide Gold, Frankincense and Myrrh like the Three Wise Men. Hammond bought a 2000 Fiat Barchetta, Clarkson bought a 2000 Mazda MX5 and May cheated and bought a 1998 BMW Z3 over budget for £3,966. The starting point was Iraq, which the three were unaware of until they landed. They were given flak jackets and helmets to get to their location. There was also at least one armed guard travelling with the group.

This time the spare was an Opel Astra 1.6 convertible - a car loathed by all three presenters. During the challenge, May had a concussion in the middle of the desert, resulting in a trip to hospital. He was discharged later in the episode and continued the journey.

Upon reaching their final hotel, the three set out to buy gifts: Hammond bought a gold necklace of Jesus' face, May bought a bottle of Frankincense — in reality, a bottle of hotel shampoo — and Clarkson was unable to find any Myrrh, so bought a Nintendo DS. After following a star, they were led to a stable containing shepherds (who apparently arrived on quad bikes,) Mary and Joseph (although not identified as such,) and a manger. They presented their gifts and asked to see the child, which was revealed to be a baby Stig.

Hammond's Fiat was voted the best by Clarkson and May, to Hammond's surprise.

=== Four seater convertibles for less than £2000 (that all turned out to be BMW 325i models) challenge ===
Series Sixteen, Episode Four

The three were given £2,000 to buy a four-seater convertible car. They all bought a BMW 325i. Hammond bought a 1987 model for £1,600 with 94,318 miles on the odometer, aftermarket wheels, aftermarket alarm, a lower suspension and extra locks. Clarkson bought a 1988 model for £1,950 that had done 137,488 miles and had a paving slab in the boot (to improve handling) and May bought a 1989 model for £1,900. Clarkson decided to turn the challenge into a test to see how different the three supposedly identical cars had become over time, so the trio ignored the producers' challenges and devised their own.

First they held a drag race without Hammond whose car broke down due to the alarm (for which he was deducted 1,000 points): accelerate to 100 mph then stop. May won comfortably as his car proved to be in better mechanical condition. Clarkson claimed that speed is not everything while May disagreed, in stark contrast to their usual opinions. Next the cars were examined by a forensics team to test the condition of their interior. Clarkson's car contained crisps, leaves, and his own dried skin, which he claimed was not disgusting at all and lost no points. May's car was in worse condition with nasal mucus, scabs and saliva costing him 30 points. Hammond again fared the worst with saliva, blood and pubic hairs, losing 30 points and, worst of all, faeces losing another 1,000 points. Thieves then attempted to steal the cars: Clarkson and May's cars were still there after 20 minutes, but Hammond's was not, costing him another 1,000 points.

The trio were then required to lap the Top Gear Test Track in their cars, trying to match the Stig's time done in a modern BMW 325i. Clarkson recorded the fastest time despite blowing his engine, followed by Hammond and then May. After that, the three cars were filled with helium and the presenters were required to sit in them to test for leaks. Clarkson and May's voices went high and squeaky due to the gas, but Hammond's did not as it had leaked out, once again leading to a 1,000 point deduction. The cars were then inspected to determine how much money was needed to restore them to showroom condition. May's required £5,500, Hammond's £7,500 and Clarkson's £11,000. Finally the presenters decided to form a stunt driving team in front of a live audience at the Essex County Fair (this did not count towards the points challenge), they all collided almost immediately.

When the points were tallied, May won easily because his car was in the best condition, giving it the lowest restoration cost. Clarkson narrowly beat Hammond to second place as his far higher restoration cost was marginally outweighed by Hammond's point deductions. This led Clarkson to conclude two things: 'all identical cars aren't necessarily identical' and 'Richard Hammond, who buys more used cars than any man alive, is useless at buying used cars'.

=== Super Coupes for less than the Nissan Pixo ===
Series Seventeen, Episode Three

Clarkson reviewed the Nissan Pixo, the cheapest new car in Britain at the time, at a price of £6,995. Thoroughly dissatisfied, Clarkson and Hammond tried to see what the same money could get them second hand. They looked at several enthusiast cars within the price, such as a Honda S2000 and a Porsche Boxster, but decided to challenge themselves to see which presenter could buy "the most amazing car" for the same price as the 3-cylinder-engined Pixo. Clarkson: 2002 Mercedes CL600 (£6,995), Hammond: 1994 BMW 850ci (£6,700), both of which had V12 engines. Challenges included a drag race that Hammond lost badly, a dyno run, (which showed Hammond having 269 bhp against the original 296 bhp, and Clarkson with 352 versus 362,) and a return to the forensics lab to establish what contaminants were present in the cars. Clarkson commented that there was no reason to buy a new Mercedes when his 2002 £6995 car drove just as well and everything still worked - except for the voice recognition which he claimed never worked, even in new cars.

At Market Harborough, they displayed their cars to the public, asking what the perceived value was, with general estimates being from £12,000 to £20,000. Back in the studio, May criticised the two for eschewing the reliable, economical and practical Pixo, saying he was prepared "to bet his hair" that within two weeks one of the two cars would require expensive servicing or repairs. Later in the series, May was proved correct when Clarkson's Mercedes broke down and he had to spend several thousand pounds fixing the engine's ignition coils. No winner was declared.

=== India Special ===
Series Seventeen, Episode Seven

The three were given £7,000 to buy a reliable British classic car and use them on the streets of India. Clarkson: 1995 Jaguar XJS 4.0 Celebration Edition, May: 1976 Rolls-Royce Silver Shadow, and Hammond: 2000 Mini 1.3L. The backup car was a 1979 Austin Allegro. Challenges included bringing Western-themed goods with their cars and building a stall to promote them, a mountain rally and modding their cars to be better able to tackle the mountain roads (for which Clarkson rewired May's brakes to set off his horn every time he used the brakes). All were winners.

=== Rallycross with less investment than golfing ===
Series Eighteen, Episode Seven

The three criticised the amount of money people have to spend just to play golf, and they claimed that you can invest less money in car racing, or in this case, rallycross. Each picked up a cheap, race-worthy car and modified it to be race-ready. Clarkson: 1996 BMW 328i, Hammond: 1999 Citroën Saxo 1.6 16v VTS, and May: 1992 Toyota MR2. Hammond was the most successful, finishing third in two heats and second in the final, ahead of Clarkson. Meanwhile, May was the least successful, finishing last in two heats and third in the 'loser's final'. All the cars, including race modifications, cost less than £2000, whereas golf costs more than that.

=== Finding the source of the river Nile ===
Series Nineteen, Episode Six and Seven

The three were given a budget of £1,500 to buy a second hand estate car in Britain which they would then use to find the source of the Nile. Clarkson: 1999 BMW 528i, May: 1996 Volvo 850 R, Hammond: 2002 Subaru Impreza WRX, backup: 1998 Ford Scorpio. The starting point was a small town in Uganda. After travelling to Lake Victoria, generally considered to be the source of the Nile, the guys reasoned that as Victoria is fed by many other tributaries, one of those must be the true source. After briefly visiting the town of Jezza and spending the night at an unhygienic hotel, the presenters decided to convert their cars into 'mobile homes'. Hammond installed a kitchen, Clarkson a cool box full of beer and a toilet on the outside of his car. May fitted a library at the front of his car and a workshop complete with tools at the rear. All of them installed some sort of bed. After a long drive through Africa, which showed that Hammond made a clever choice with his all wheel drive Subaru, the three had to cross a wide river and built a raft to convey their cars. They all made it across safely, but the Scorpio fell into the river.

During the journey as each presenter's car suffered and broke down, they stole bits from each other's cars to carry on (one particular theft from May by Clarkson led to May yelling Clarkson's name upon discovery). Eventually Hammond's car broke a wishbone, which had to be welded to finish the challenge. Near the end, the three were informed that only one presenter could find the source and get his name in the history books, so each raced to where they suspected the source would be. Despite Hammond making the best progress thanks to his AWD, May was the first to find the true source of the Nile, making him the winner.

=== Proving that hot hatchbacks from their youth are better than their modern equivalents ===
Series Twenty-One, Episode One

The presenters were sent out to buy any hot hatchback from their youth - specifically the 1980s (although they turned out to be later examples of model generations that had been introduced then). Clarkson: 1989 Volkswagen Golf GTi for £800, May: 1992 Ford Fiesta XR2i for £750, Hammond: 1992 Vauxhall Nova SRi for £700. Challenges included a hill climb (during the return trip, Hammond crashed his Nova, setting up a running joke throughout the challenge,) a "supermarket sweep" gymkhana event through a closed supermarket, (with Hammond again finishing on his side), and a drag race, in which Hammond critically damaged his car's engine after accidentally changing from second gear into first instead of third. In the final challenge, the cars were chased by the "TGPD" (Top Gear Police Department) to see how long they could evade pursuit. Hammond was caught instantly due to his damaged engine, while Clarkson and May had their cars destroyed after long drawn out pursuits. In the end the presenters decided that as each car had won an individual event, all were the winners.

=== Burma Special ===
Series Twenty-One, Episode Six and Seven

The three presenters traveled to Burma (now Myanmar) for a road trip to Thailand and the River Kwai, each driving a second-hand lorry that they used to build a bridge over the river: Clarkson: Isuzu TX with an extensive stereo and a dumper truck layout in the back, Hammond: Isuzu TX modified with added space, May: Hino FB110 with a crane on the back. Starting from Rangoon (Yangon), they continued through Naypyidaw before crossing into Thailand; along the way Clarkson twice weaponized May's crane against him while the latter was sleeping in a tent (he admitted to doing one of them because of May snoring). They eventually realised while constructing the bridge that they were actually at the River Kok. All were winners.

=== Homemade ambulance challenge ===
Series Twenty-Two, Episode Three

The presenters decided to improve ambulances. Initially, they modified a P45 (Series 19, Episode 1) with a flashing beacon and a gurney that attached to a rear-mounted hitch, but this failed when the gurney jackknifed and ejected the patient. The producers then instructed the presenters to 'do it properly', and each bought an alternative to the standard ambulance used by the NHS (a Mercedes Sprinter). Hammond spent £5000 on a customised 1992 Chevy G20 V8 Van, which he lauded for its 5.7 litre V8 engine and its bargain price (compared to the £150,000 cost of a standard NHS ambulance). Clarkson bought a 1987 Porsche 944 Turbo, planning to stow the patient under the all-glass hatchback (Hammond pointed out that the patient would bake under the glass). May bought a 1996 Ford Scorpio Cardinal hearse that was initially mocked by the others, despite May pointing out the Cosworth-designed V6 engine and traction control. The winner was Hammond.

=== Find a cheap car that still lives up to the title of classic ===
Series Twenty-Two, Episode Eight

The trio are told to buy affordable classics and report with them to an old railway station in Buckinghamshire. They are told they must live like classic car enthusiasts. Hammond arrived first in a 1972 MGB GT, a car that he claimed is the most iconic British sports car. Clarkson arrived next in a 1978 Fiat 124 Spider which he admitted is incredibly pretty but predicted problems as with all classic cars. He also bemoaned the fact that it is an American specification vehicle with 5-mph bumpers, raised ride height, and oversized aftermarket wheels, giving it poor handling. Finally, May arrived in a 1974 Peugeot 304 S Cabriolet that arrived already broken. The trio were challenged to 'tinker' with their cars. May made his work and added continental yellow headlamps. Clarkson returned his to its original specification. Hammond gave his MGB sporting credentials with a new exhaust, bucket seats and a sporty paint scheme. After taking part in a Japfest show at Castle Combe circuit May's car was designated the worst. Hammond and Clarkson tied for points. The cars suffered badly during the Japfest race and Clarkson's eventually failed, leaving Hammond the winner by default. Hammond expected to be part of the aerial display and was made to take part in a Wing walking demonstration.

=== Cheap SUV challenge ===
Series Twenty-Two, Episode Eight

The presenters were challenged to buy a lifestyle SUV with a maximum budget of £250. May: 2001 Mitsubishi Shogun Pinin (£150), Hammond: 1997 Jeep Cherokee (£250), Clarkson: 1998 Vauxhall Frontera Sport RS (£140). Challenges included a snow slope climbing test, a game of tag with caravans hitched to their cars and featuring 'Leisure Stig' in a Kia Sportage, a 0-60 acceleration and braking test at a muddy test area with 'Leisure Stig' setting the benchmark in the Sportage, modifying their cars to suit the lifestyle theme better and doing some 'leisure activity' at a nearby pond, rolling their cars down a steep cliff to test the car's robustness and safety, and a five-mile off-road race from a Yorkshire grouse moor to a conference and dinner held at Yorkshire's Broughton Hall. The last to arrive had to do an after-dinner speech. During the race, May fell far behind, but caught up after he found a farm track that enabled him to overtake Clarkson and Hammond, who were bogged down. Hammond eventually freed himself from the mud, and Clarkson, upset for not being able to climb the riverbank after fording a small river, had to cut the Frontera in half. Hammond had to deliver the speech, which didn't please the crowd.

=== Find something that offers more luxury than the Orient Express ===
Series Twenty-Three, Episode Four

Chris Evans, Sabine Schmitz and Matt LeBlanc were given a maximum budget of £3,066 - the price of an Orient Express ticket - to buy something equally luxurious, while Eddie Jordan boarded the Orient Express itself. Evans: 2002 Jaguar XJ8 (£2,100), Schmitz: 2002 Audi A8 (£2,750), LeBlanc: 1989 Honda Goldwing (£2,500). Jordan traveled the Orient Express from London to Venice. On the way, LeBlanc, Evans and Schmitz were told to pick a Michelin star chef in Paris and allow them to prepare food to be presented at a chateau along the way. Evans and Schmitz's cars' cabin space allowed the chef to prepare the food using engine heat (exhaust heat in Evans' case) allowing the food to cooked en route. LeBlanc had to make several stops to allow his chef to prepare and cook the food. Schmitz was declared the winner. During the next leg, LeBlanc was hindered by his motorcycle's small fuel tank, and Schmitz ran out of money, forcing her to travel on foot. Evans had enough money left to hire a water taxi, although Venice's water speed limit hindered him. Jordan finished first, joined by Schmitz and then Evans. LeBlanc was still on the road, but he believed himself to be in the lead. Once back in the studio, Evans, Schmitz and LeBlanc pointed out that they still had their vehicles (although LeBlanc decided to sell his Goldwing,) while all Jordan had as a souvenir was a pair of spoons from the train.

=== Kazakhstan Road Trip ===
Series Twenty-Four, Episode One

LeBlanc, Rory Reid, and Harris were instructed to buy a car with at least 480,000 miles on the clock - a distance equal to a round trip to the Moon. Harris:Volvo V70 Bi-Fuel, LeBlanc: Mercedes-Benz E-Class, Reid: London black cab. They traveled to Kazakhstan, where they were to drive to the Baikonur Cosmodrome. First, they raced each other at a quarry, with Harris crashing into LeBlanc. Next, they headed to Kyzylorda to participate in a game of auto-tag against locals in Lada Rivas. The next morning, LeBlanc fitted a custom crash bar made out of steel pipes to protect his damaged back end, and Reid set a challenge of who can reach the closest top speed to its original factory claims. Harris clocked 104 mph against 125 mph, LeBlanc clocked 100 mph versus 112 mph, while Reid clocked 84 mph - higher than the claimed top speed of 81 mph.

The final challenge was to see who could log the most miles from the starting point to Baikonur with a condition: only the winner could attend the launch event and the losing cars would be subjected to 'hard labour'. In preparation, LeBlanc stripped the Mercedes to make it quicker, Harris repainted the Volvo so it resembled the Volvo 850 BTCC and installed a 'high-mileage fuel tank' - a 55-gallon oil drum - while Reid did nothing. LeBlanc returned to a salt bed he previously passed through (where his silencer and makeshift crash bar fell off), Harris went into town to look for an airfield to race around, while Reid jacked up the back wheels of his cab and put it in gear to run up easy miles. While refuelling, he knocked the jacks and the car drove off by itself, before beaching on a dune. At the cosmodrome, the results were announced: Harris did 211 miles, LeBlanc did 284 miles, Reid did 329 miles. The losing cars were turned into taxicabs by locals. At the end of the show, Reid showed that his black cab had been mounted on a plinth beside the Buran spacecraft at the cosmodrome.

=== Cuban road trip in secondhand sports cars ===
Series Twenty-Four, Episode Six

Reid and Harris were instructed to buy a classic car with a budget of £5,000 and report at the Bay of Pigs. Harris: Maserati Biturbo, Reid: third-generation targa top Chevrolet Camaro RS. The first stop was Coliseo. Reid's Chevrolet V8 was quickly recognised by the locals, unlike Harris' Maserati. Next, they headed to Varadero to see the local racing scene. Along the way, Reid decided to allow locals to hitch a ride in their cars. He panicked as one of his passengers brought a chicken. Upon arriving, Reid and Harris decided to race the locals in a drag race. Afterwards, they raced each other; Reid claimed a "moral victory" due to his Camaro winning the locals' hearts due to his V8. After the race, they headed to Havana, where Harris had nostalgia in the Malecón road where the first two Cuban Grands Prix were held. In the final part of the trip, they returned to Varadero to have a rematch with local street racers, but raced on a makeshift oval track made using used tyres. Although Harris started second to last, he won due to his agile Maserati.

=== Sports cars in Honshu ===
Series Twenty-Five, Episode Three

LeBlanc and Harris were instructed to buy a second-hand 1990s Japanese sports car for a budget of 1 million yen (the equivalent of £6,900) at the USS Tokyo car auction center to be shipped back and sold in Britain. Harris: Mazda RX-7, LeBlanc: Nissan Skyline 25GT-T. Their first challenge was a two lap race in the Gunsai Touge while carrying a sumo wrestler as a passenger, which Harris won. Next, they headed to Fukushima to chew over the Fukushima Daiichi nuclear disaster. Afterwards, they headed to the Ebisu Circuit to drift against local drifters in Kei trucks. In order to help the presenters do tandem drifts, the cars' rear tires were swapped with space-saver spare tires, tied using a rope and secured with a pair of used tires. Near the finish line, one of the tires blew, damaging cars. The final challenge was to race to Enbu to reach the transport, as only one car could be transported back to Britain. LeBlanc and Harris took separate routes: LeBlanc tried the highway, but got stuck at a tollbooth, while Harris took the mountain pass and backroads, where he had to deal with local traffic. Harris won by a small margin. Once back in the UK, his RX-7 did not get a profitable offer.

=== Luxury cars for less than Dacia Sandero ===
Series Twenty-Six, Episode Four

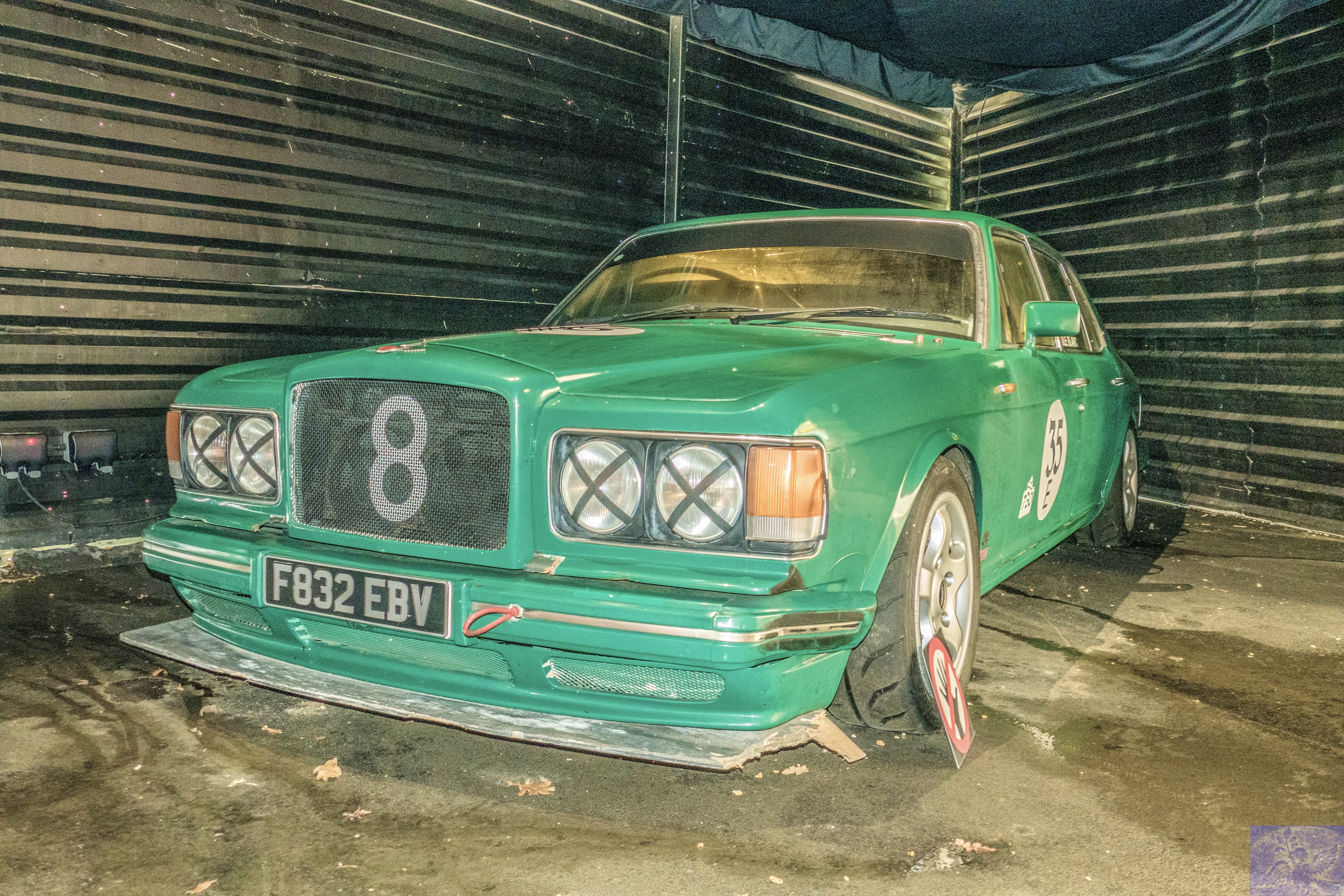
Matt's Bentley Turbo R

The presenters sought luxury cars that cost less than a new Dacia Sandero, which had a price of £6,000. LeBlanc: 1988 Bentley Turbo R, Reid: 1975 Rolls-Royce Silver Shadow, Harris: 1992 Mercedes-Benz 600 SEL. The presenters headed to the track for a top speed drag race. Reid scored 70 mph, LeBlanc notched 110 mph, while Harris clocked 135 mph. Next was a beat-the-clock challenge in a simulated urban driving environment against The Stig in the Sandero. LeBlanc's Bentley suffered a breakdown and Reid wrecked the market square. Afterwards, the cars attempted a "no-hands" drag race against the Sandero, where all of the used cars failed. Then, a single-lap pursuit race was attempted against the Sandero, preceded by a dyno run to measure how far the cars have to be behind the Sandero. At the rolling road, Reid's Rolls-Royce scored 161.9 hp from its original 189 hp, LeBlanc's Bentley scored 262.1 hp from its original 300 hp, while Harris' Mercedes scored 379.7 hp from its standard 394 hp. Reid had to start 87 meters behind the Sandero, followed by LeBlanc at 187 meters, and Harris at 305 meters. LeBlanc's Bentley refused to start. The Sandero won again, out-gripping opponents. The final challenge was the Birkett six-hour relay race at Silverstone, with the Sandero as a backup car. Initially, Harris made good progress, managing to catch a considerable number of cars early on. However, he soon had to pit to refuel. LeBlanc's hastily refurbished Bentley had faulty brakes. Reid's Rolls lacked grip, speed, and working gauges, furthered hindered by poor fuel economy. In the middle of the race, Harris' Mercedes lost a wheel, causing considerable damage to its running gear. Eventually all the cars became terminally damaged, forcing Harris into the Sandero. In a last attempt, LeBlanc's Bentley received a brake caliper donation from Reid's Rolls, enabling them to reach the second-to-last position.

=== First cars for less than £4,000 ===
Series Twenty-Seven, Episode One

The presenters were given a budget of £4,000 - the average cost of a first car in the UK - to hunt for a secondhand model as close as possible to their respective first cars and report to Ethiopia. McGuinness: Mark II Ford Escort (£2,100), Flintoff: 1999 Porsche Boxster (£3,700), Harris: 1990 Mini (£3,300). The presenters drove from Gondar to the Afar Triangle, a place thought to be the birthplace of humankind.

On their way, Flintoff revealed that his Porsche had a faulty roof, overheating and clutch issues, while McGuinness and Harris were pleased with their choices. The first challenge was a compilation of rally-style driving tests done in a quarry where despite universal cheating, Harris and McGuinness completed the course, with Harris claiming a moral victory, while the Boxster got beached. Mishaps on the way to Dallol included a flat tyre for McGuinness and overheating for Flintoff, requiring a tow from McGuinness.

The next challenge was a blindfolded acceleration and braking test, with the aim to be close to a traffic cone at the end of a runway. McGuinness stopped almost next to the cone, amid accusations of cheating, beating Harris and Flintoff.

At the edge of Afar Triangle, they had to cross the Danakil Depression to reach Dallol. The extreme heat prompted Flintoff to cut off his roof, while Harris suffered heat stroke and had to stop to recover. The conditions damaged cars, costing Flintoff his extra cooling fans, and Harris a mechanical breakdown.

=== Budget electric sports car ===
Series Twenty-Seven, Episode Two

The presenters are tasked to build electric sports cars. Harris: 1972 Triumph Spitfire, McGuinness: 2011 Nissan Leaf, Flintoff: 1994 Subaru BRAT. Harris added BMW i3 batteries and a motor that produced 260 hp. Flintoff retrofitted his with Tesla's electric motor, putting out 500 hp and dubbed "Mute". McGuinness modified his car by giving it scissor doors and adding a large number of different badges on the tailgate. (Note: The full list of badges reads: "R-Sport" - Jaguar F-Pace, "GTi" - VW Golf, "Supercharged" - Audi, "Nismo" - Nissan, "GTR" - Nissan and "Zero emission" - Nissan)

Taking place at the disused Ironbridge power stations complex in Telford, their first challenge was a timed lap around the complex. Flintoff went first and clocked 1 minute and 10.5 seconds, followed by McGuinness who clocked 1 minute and 5 seconds, and Harris who clocked at 1 minute and 8 seconds.

Afterwards, they took the road to Tamworth. However, McGuinness' Leaf ran out of juice, prompting him to search for a charger. He charged at a local neighbourhood, while Harris and Flintoff charged at the local service station; McGuinness' method left him hours behind schedule. Their next challenge was a handling test based on the classic buzz wire children's game at the Daytona Tamworth go kart track, where each presenter received an electric shock if they nudged the barriers. McGuinness went first and clocked 1 minute and 11.59 seconds, followed by Harris at 1 minute and 14.25 seconds and Flintoff at 1 minute and 6.56 seconds.

Next, they returned to Telford to see if their cars could garner enough publicity at the Energy and Rural Business Show, judged by the number of likes received by each presenter. Flintoff, as a former athlete, ran on a treadmill to charge his Subaru, while McGuinness staged a raffle and Harris went outside to set a small gymkhana course for his Triumph. McGuinness won the challenge, scoring 174 likes (dubbed as "green smiley faces").

After the expo, the presenters make their way to Mansfield. On the way, Flintoff revealed that he still kept the BRAT's original petrol engine to beat range anxiety. Their challenge at the city was an endurance race dubbed "24 Minutes of Mansfield", putting their electric cars against some new electric cars. Despite an early lead, McGuinness scored only 15 laps, fewer than Harris and Flintoff's 18. All of their cars were outperformed by the newer rivals.

=== Cheap, rare cars in Borneo ===
Series Twenty-Seven, Episode Four

McGuinness and Flintoff were tasked to find cheap and rare cars and report to Borneo. McGuinness: 1979 Matra Bagheera (£6,000), Flintoff: 1981 Austin Allegro estate (£3,500); McGuinness' car was used as press car, featured in the original brochure, and one of four remaining in the UK. They were tasked to go from the local airfield to Brunei "until they can drive no more".

Along the way, the presenters had to navigate jungle terrain, which damaged McGuinness' Matra. By nightfall, their trip was temporarily halted by British Army's Royal Gurkha Rifles' 2nd Battalion, who provided necessary assistance to navigate the jungle. At the destination, they presented their cars before the Sultan of Brunei.

During the night, Flintoff modified the Austin to better cope with the jungle. For the second leg, McGuinness parted ways with Flintoff and followed a logging track that led his party to a nearby river. They crossed using makeshift rafts. Flintoff's party cleared the jungle and found smooth tarmac.

The final leg of the trip was a 40-mile race to Bandar Seri Begawan. While Flintoff made good progress on the road, McGuinness' river approach put him closer to the finish line, despite having to navigate gravel tracks. While on the highway, Flintoff's Austin overheated, giving McGuiness an advantage. Despite the setback, Flintoff arrived first, but they were denied entry to the palace. Back at the studio, the cars were presented with rainbow colours, in solidarity with the LGBT community, responding to Brunei's recent anti-LGBT laws. The winner was Flintoff (after final deliberation by Harris).

=== Nepal Special ===
Series Twenty-Eight, Episode Zero

The presenters head to Nepal to see what is the best city car for less than £6,000. McGuinness: 1995 Peugeot 106 Rallye (£3,500), Harris:1987 Renault 4 (£5,000), Flintoff: 2011 Hulas Mustang (£6,000). They were instructed to drive from Kathmandu to Lo Manthang.

On the way to Pokhara, McGuinness got stuck and had to be towed by Flintoff, revealing that the Mustang was only a two-wheel drive.

On the way to Jomsom, rough roads damaged Harris and McGuinness' cars. The Peugeot required garage repairs, prompting the presenters to stay the night. The next morning Flintoff again had to tow McGuinness' Peugeot. During a river crossing, Flintoff had to tow Harris and McGuinness' vehicles.

For the final leg, the presenters split up: Harris and Flintoff purchased trekking equipment, while McGuinness headed to the market to buy rations. After this, they drove locals to Muktinath Temple. Flintoff carried sherpas, McGuinness carried local women, and Harris carried holy men. Nearing the temple, the trio had a hillclimb challenge, finishing at the temple car park. Despite a 30-second head start, McGuinness overtook Harris and Flintoff and reached the temple first.

From the temple, they resumed their journey to Lo Manthang, a distance of 40 miles. At high altitude the Mustang had to tow the other cars at various times. While trying to start McGuinness' car, Harris forgot to apply his handbrake and his car rolled back and tipped over, totaling it. He then had to car share with Flintoff. The surviving cars made it to Lo Manthang where McGuinness' Peugeot passed the city gateway with a small margin. Harris eventually restored his Renault 4 in his own garage.

=== Secondhand convertibles for less than £600 ===
Series Twenty-Eight, Episode One

The presenters are told to buy secondhand convertibles for less than £600 - the average cost of summer holiday in the UK. McGuinness: 1996 Ford Escort Cabriolet (£500), Harris: 1998 Mercedes-Benz SLK (£600), Flintoff: 1991 Chrysler LeBaron (£450). They were told to report to Bognor Regis before heading for Essex. Flintoff discovered that his Chrysler had no power steering.

Their first stop was at Thruxton Circuit for their first challenge: driving around the track against "summer holiday traffic" before they were overtaken by The Stig in a Mustang convertible. Flintoff immediately retired due to a puncture, while McGuinness survived longer but was overtaken by The Stig. Harris nearly made it to the finish line.

They drove 20 miles to a motocross track for a timed lap challenge while their cars were rigged with "low friction, synthetic sweat substitute" to simulate moist conditions caused by sweating. McGuinness, who went first, covered only 42 yards before crashing. Harris finished a full lap in 1 minute and 45 seconds, while Flintoff completed the course in 1 minute and 48 seconds. McGuinness restarted and finished in 1 minute, 36 seconds.

Afterwards, Flintoff's Chrysler suffered from overheating, forcing McGuinness to tow him to a driving range. There, the presenters were faced with a test of "agility": driving around the range and catching as many golf balls as possible in two minutes. Flintoff went first, where his Chrysler caught 9 golf balls. McGuinness was next, landing 38 golf balls. Lastly, it was Harris' turn, snatching 16 golf balls.

The next day, they had to go through a causeway during high tide, which McGuinness accomplished. Harris decided to follow McGuinness, but his SLK's engine cut out, prompting Flintoff to push him until his Chrysler beached near the finish line. Flintoff admitted that his car was the worst of the three, while he and Harris noted that this was the second time Paddy had won a challenge using a Ford Escort.

=== American road trip in cars costing less than £5,000 ===
Series Twenty-eight, Episode Three

The presenters were told to buy "the ultimate American road trip car" for less than £5,000 online and meet in Cusco, Peru. Harris: Dodge Dart, Flintoff: Volkswagen Bus, McGuinness: de-roofed Pontiac Firebird. They were tasked to go from Cusco to the Vilcabamba mountains, tracing the Inca road networks.

Quickly, the Pontiac overheated and the Dodge had sketchy brakes and barely-functioning wipers. On an empty stretch of road they conducted an impromptu drag race, but McGuinness' rear axle came loose.

The following morning, the presenters left Ollantaytambo, after McGuinness picked up a new car: a fourth-generation Oldsmobile Cutlass. At the local market, Harris bought fruits and vegetables, Flintoff purchased a bunch of flowers as decoration, while McGuinness bought two wooden phalluses. Their next stop was Abra Malaga mountain pass.

On their third day, the presenters went to check the local "motorcar cross" scene: dirt track racing involving a three-wheeled motorcycle manned by a rider and a passenger. Harris, as a professional racing driver, went first. The next challenge was Abra Yanama mountain pass, one of the world's most dangerous roads, with an unpaved surface and a height of more than 4,600 meters. Along the journey, Flintoff put his Bus' "secret weapon" to use: an electrolysis kit installed to the Bus to help supply the engine with oxygen. Harris' Dodge lost its clutch, prompting him to abandon the car, while McGuinness' Oldsmobile blew a fuse (causing its horn to ring at times) and removed its driver side door. Freddie was declared the winner.

=== Written-off performance cars for less than £6,000 ===
Series Twenty-Nine, Episode Two

The presenters were told to find performance cars that had been written off by insurance companies and meet at the track. McGuinness: 2006 Porsche Cayman S (£5,500), Flintoff: 2008 Maserati Quattroporte (£5,750), Harris: 2003 Ford Focus RS (£5,000).

Their first test was an acceleration test. McGuinness initially took the lead, but ran out of runway and beached, but not before reaching 141.6 mph, compared to Flintoff's 135.8 mph and Harris' 125 mph. Harris won the challenge as he was the only one who stayed on the runway, as dictated by the rules.

Next, they played a game of musical chairs in a simulated car park to test for low-speed agility against a Toyota Prius driven by The Stig's teenage cousins. McGuinness got eliminated first, pitting Harris against Flintoff all the way to final round - won by Flintoff; Harris veered off the track after a nudge from Freddie.

Afterwards, the producers told them to use the rest of their £6,000 budget to fix the car. McGuinness and Harris managed to mend theirs to full working order, however Flintoff chose a different path by stripping his Maserati and dubbing it "Mad Max-serati". They then headed for Alexandra Palace for their next test: reaching 50 mph in the wall of death, with Ken Fox from Ken Fox Wall of Death providing necessary instructions. McGuinness went first, where he clocked 55.72 mph while breaking his Porsche's rear suspension. Next, Harris reached 54.85 mph, followed by Flintoff, who touched 56.92 mph, however his Maserati was unable to make it to the top of the wall, and shed multiple parts.

=== Cheap rental car in Cyprus ===
Series Twenty-Nine, Episode Three

The presenters headed to Cyprus to pick up cheap rental cars for €30 for two days. McGuinness: Ford Focus cabriolet, Flintoff: Suzuki Jimny, Harris: Kia Picanto.

First, they headed to Achna Speedway for a "hot lap challenge"; lapping the track against "local traffic" (simulated traffic running in opposite direction) while their cars' cabin was heated to 40 °C. Flintoff went first and finished in 3 minutes and 15 seconds, followed by Harris, who squeaked out 3 minutes and 4 seconds, and McGuinness, who went quicker than Harris by three-tenths of a second.

Next, they headed to the reservoir through gravel roads, where Flintoff's Jimny gave him an advantage. The presenters were instructed to do a "drag race": using their cars to pull a water skier across the lake. Harris went first and clocked 15 mph, followed by McGuinness at 3 mph, while Flintoff did 12 mph.

The following day, they headed to Mount Olympus ski resort to receive their next challenge: racing around the ski resort complex to test cold weather performance. Flintoff went first, followed by Harris, while McGuinness struggled to unhitch the Focus from its chain.

After the ski slope challenge, the presenters returned their cars to Paphos International Airport to be inspected by the rental agent. Flintoff and McGuinness' cars were heavily damaged, with the agent scrapping McGuinness' Focus, however Harris' Picanto had only minimal damage.

=== Second-hand dad's cars ===
Series Thirty, Episode One

The presenters kicked off the series in the Lake District driving cars owned by their dads: Flintoff: Ford Cortina, McGuinness: Ford Fiesta, Harris: BMW 3 Series. First, they headed to a local airfield to test which car could get closest to their speedometer's maximum number; Harris hit 112 mph out of the indicated 140 mph, Flintoff reached 85 out of 140, while McGuinness scored 65 out of 100. Next, Flintoff devised a "dad driving" reverse-slalom challenge. He clocked 51 seconds, with McGuinness clocked at 50.72 and Harris at 41.94.

Leaving the airfield, Harris and Flintoff made remarks about their fathers, before heading to Cumbria Kart Racing Club test track to do a lap while sitting on each other's lap in order to simulate their childhood; McGuinness' Fiesta had the quickest time at 1 minutes and 32 seconds, well above the other two.

The following day, the presenters headed to Grizedale Forest rally stage for a time trial using three rally-prepped Ford Escorts against "Stig's dad" in a MG Metro 6R4. Harris was only 12 seconds behind Stig's dad, followed by Flintoff at 37, and Paddy at over a minute. After finishing, the presenters went to Windermere Ferry, which was due to sail in 20 minutes, without navigation aid and with their previous times serving as handicap. McGuinness and Harris navigated their way by reading signs; while Flintoff had to ask a bystander. In the end, only Paddy managed to board the ferry.

=== Secondhand sports cars for midlife crisis ===
Series Thirty, Episode Four

The presenters set out to find secondhand sports cars for a midlife crisis with a budget of £8,000, despite seeing the moment as a "midlife opportunity" instead. Flintoff: TVR Chimaera, Harris: Vauxhall Monaro, McGuinness: Toyota MR2 kit car (£9,500).

Their first challenge was at Castle Combe Circuit, where they defended their lead against a grid of teenage racing drivers in a JSTC-spec Citroën Saxo. McGuinness and Flintoff got overtaken six times, while Harris won the challenge as his Monaro was able to fend off the junior racers.

Next, they headed to MoD Lyneham for a handicapped gymkhana session, where they had to wear a geriatric simulation suit; to aid skidding, their cars' rear tires were swapped with skinnier ones. This challenge was won by Freddie, who clocked in at just over five minutes.

The following day, the presenters set off on large-displacement motorcycles to Cotswold Water Park, for a motorised triathlon challenge, consisting of driving, jetskiing, swimming, cycling, and more driving. Harris initially had a respectable lead, but lagged during the swimming stage. During the cycling stint, Harris' progress was hampered by his damaged bicycle, while Flintoff enjoyed a good lead thanks to his physique. Despite having to run after his TVR suffered a breakdown, Flintoff scored an overall victory.

=== Icelandic rally expedition in second-hand British cars ===
Series Thirty-One, Episode Three

Harris and McGuinness headed for Iceland to do a rally expedition using second-hand British cars bought for less than £2,000. Harris: rally-spec Vauxhall Chevette, McGuinness: Rolls-Royce Silver Shadow. Flintoff: Range Rover Mk1 (Flintoff could not participate because of COVID-19).

At sand drag racing, they raced against The Stig in a Range Rover. Harris won due to the Vauxhall's light weight, earning himself a parachute ride. Harris complained about the Chevette's engine and tire noise, as well as the straight-cut gears. They then had do some strongman challenges, where Harris and McGuinness narrowly won.

Next, they headed to Hekla to spend the night and race to the edge of the volcano's crater against The Stig in an Arctic Trucks-modified Ford F-150. With half an hour head start, Harris managed to find a fairly smooth track, enabling him and McGuinness to pick up some pace. Despite some setbacks, Harris and McGuinness narrowly won. The Rolls-Royce was declared the better car.

=== Classic cars for new drivers ===
Series Thirty-One, Episode Five

The presenters thought that buying and insuring new cars is too expensive for a new driver, so they headed out to look for classic cars for less than £7,000 - the average cost of a car and its insurance for new drivers. McGuinness: MG MGB, Flintoff: Volkswagen Beetle, Harris: Lada Niva; all over 40 years old, which made them exempt from tax and MOT. They travelled from Devon to Cornwall, where they were met with challenges.

Their first challenge was an economy run in a quarry, where they had to beat The Stig's record of eleven laps in just over 6 minutes in a Vauxhall Corsa - one of Britain's most popular first cars, using £1 worth of petrol. Flintoff covered 10 laps, followed by Harris with 8 laps. Meanwhile, McGuinness had a blast and nearly did 12 laps before running out of fuel near the start/finish line.

Next, they headed to Davidstow Circuit for their next test: getting as close as they could to 50 mph while having their entire cars' interior covered with plastic wrap and sanitary materials and themselves wearing personal protective equipment. Harris did 38 mph, Flintoff did 37 mph, and McGuinness did 44 mph; on the second run, Flintoff did 42 mph, followed by McGuinness at 44 mph and Harris at 49 mph. On the third run, McGuinness got disqualified for going over 50 mph and blowing off the paint bomb planted inside the car, while Flintoff and Harris tied at 49 mph, prompting them to have another run, which ended up in another draw.

Then, they went to Perranporth Airfield, where they paired with young drivers for a series of driving tests consisting of hill start test, road clearing test with the cars' horn, reverse driving test, stop-and-go test at a gate barrier, high speed slalom through simulated traffic, full emergency stop with driver swap, and a small navigated race to Headland Hotel. Flintoff went first, followed by McGuinness and Harris. Flintoff's young driver fared well despite stalling at the gate, while McGuinness' young driver impressed him with his skills at the first stint, even though he had just passed his driving test. On the second stint, Harris' Lada and McGuinness' MG managed to close in on Flintoff's slow Beetle, only to be halted by holiday traffic. Despite arriving first, McGuinness won by just four seconds off Harris' elapsed time. After some deliberations, the presenters decided that classic cars are not the best option for new drivers due to lack of safety features.

=== Reliable used cars for less than £500 ===
Series Thirty-Two, Episode Four

The presenters were tasked with finding a used car for under £500, all with full MOT in five minutes. They could only perform a quick inspection, start the engine, but not move it. McGuinness: Mini Cooper, Harris: Mercedes C220 CDI, Flintoff: Volvo V70.

The producers set up a series of obstacles at a tank test track to simulate a full year's worth of wear and tear. A tire dragging test involved a steep hill, followed by a suspension test through a series of bumpy dips, and a water splash test through three feet of water. A benchmark time of 3 minutes and 56 seconds by a tank was set. At the tire test, Flintoff initially tried to have a go due to his car having a tow hitch, but his Volvo did not have enough torque, forcing him to receive an additional push from Harris. At the suspension test, Flintoff went first, due to his Volvo having the most ground clearance, followed by Harris and McGuinness. Afterwards, at the water splash test, McGuinness went first and cleared the obstacle, but Harris got stuck and needed a push from Flintoff, whose Volvo in turn refused to start in the middle of the pond, requiring a tow back to the surface. In the end, after 21 minutes, the presenters failed to complete the course, as their respective cars were effectively dead.

In the next part, the presenters had to choose cars again. McGuinness: Honda Civic, Harris: Mazda 323F, Flintoff: Toyota Celica. They headed to a scrapyard where they had to race against The Stig in a two-lap race, where the losing car was to be scrapped. Harris went first against the Stig in a Rover 25, where he struggled with his Mazda's automatic transmission, causing him to narrowly lose and his Mazda to be scrapped. Next, Flintoff's Celica was pitted against the diesel-powered MG ZT-T. Flintoff initially had a good lead thanks to his Celica's sporting credentials; however, he overshot a corner, costing him the lead. McGuinness went last, pitted against a first-gen Vauxhall Agila; he lost to the Stig in a nimbler Agila.

=== Road trip across Thailand in old pickup trucks ===
Series Thirty-Three, Episode One

The presenters headed to Thailand to do a road trip in pickup trucks, as the country has the most pickup trucks per capita than any other country. Flintoff opted for a Toyota Hilux, while McGuinness chose an Isuzu D-Max and Harris chose a locally converted BMW E30.

They headed to Kaeng Krachan Circuit to have a look at Thailand's local pickup truck racing scene and have their first challenge: a relay race where the presenters are teamed up with local racing drivers; Harris and McGuinness' stint went fairly well, but Flintoff made an error that cost him some time. Harris won the relay race.

Next, they continued their trip towards Bangkok, where McGuinness led the presenters to a market complex that caters to car modifications. They had a look at the local car tuning and drifting scene, where McGuinness took a passenger seat alongside local drifter Christy Louis in a drift-built Nissan 300ZX.

Then, Harris and McGuinness continued their journey from Bangkok, now heading north near the border with Laos with bales of grass on their trucks' bed; at this point, Flintoff underwent isolation after contracting COVID-19, forcing him to abandon the rest of the trip. As the two racked up distance, they started to go through unpaved paths and the hot tropical weather started to make Harris feel uncomfortable to a point that he broke his BMW's window so he could get better ventilation. Upon unloading the bales, the two realized that the bales were used to plot a course for wooden cart racing, known as "Formula Hmong", where the two participated. Harris fell off his cart, while McGuinness managed to finish the course. Due to him winning, he now had the chance to redo the course against a local participant, where he fell off his cart just before he managed to overtake his rival.

Having finished with the cart racing, the two made their way to a temple that was under construction, now with crates of tiles on their truck beds.
