= List of Top Gear (2002 TV series) episodes =

Top Gear is a British television series that focuses on various motor vehicles, primarily cars, in which its hosts conduct reviews on new models and vintage classics, as well as tackling various motoring related challenges, and inviting celebrities to set a time on their specially designed race-course. The programme is a relaunched version of the original 1977 show of the same name.

For its first series, the show was presented by Jeremy Clarkson, Richard Hammond, and Jason Dawe, with support from an anonymous race driver, The Stig. The format of the first series was more similar to the original show than later series and had interviews with guests outside of the Star in a Reasonably Priced Car segment. Dawe was replaced by James May for the second series, where the show chose to focus only on car reviews, guest laps in the Reasonably Priced Car, the Cool Wall, and the Greatest Car Ever segment (exclusive to this series), with each episode also having a single short challenge. This strict format was later relaxed, with the third series showing more challenges; these challenges became longer from the fourth series as the races and the cheap car challenges were introduced. By series 7, there were fewer reviews of "affordable" cars that were the main focus of the original show, and the show became almost entirely focused on longer and partially scripted challenges, with one or two car reviews (usually only featuring performance cars) per episode. Regular road trip-style special episodes were also introduced from series 9, often aired as a Christmas special.

This new format remained unchanged until the line-up was changed after the departure of Clarkson, Hammond and May at the end of the twenty-second series. Chris Evans and Matt LeBlanc took over as the main hosts, with a team of co-presenters consisting of Chris Harris, Rory Reid, Eddie Jordan and Sabine Schmitz. After the twenty-third series, Evans departed from the show, leading to LeBlanc being joined by Harris and Reid as the main hosts, with occasional appearances from Jordan and Schmitz. LeBlanc departed the show following the twenty-sixth series in 2019, and was replaced by new hosts Paddy McGuinness and Freddie Flintoff joining Harris for the twenty-seventh series later that year.

The following is a list of episodes, listed in order of their original UK air date along with featured cars, challenges, and guests. For more information on features and challenges included in each series, visit each series' respective page. Comprehensive lists of challenges and races can be found at Top Gear challenges and Top Gear races.

The list does not include shorter spin-off episodes produced for charity (Top Gear of the Pops, produced for Red Nose Day; Top Ground Gear Force and Stars in Fast Cars, produced for Sport Relief, an Ashes to Ashes parody Children in Need does Star in a Reasonably Priced Car (for Children in Need), 'Best of' episodes, and some other specials, such as 50 Years of Bond Cars, An Evening with Top Gear, and A Tribute To Sabine Schmitz.

During the course of the programme, 240 episodes of Top Gear aired, including three specials over thirty-three series, between 20 October 2002 and 18 December 2022.

== Series overview ==
Series	Episodes	Originally released			Average UK viewers (in millions)
Series	Episodes	First released	Last released	Network	Average UK viewers (in millions)
1	10	20 October 2002	29 December 2002	BBC Two	3.30
2	10	11 May 2003	20 July 2003	BBC Two	3.16
3	9	26 October 2003	28 December 2003	BBC Two	4.03
4	10	9 May 2004	1 August 2004	BBC Two	3.48
5	9	24 October 2004	26 December 2004	BBC Two	4.15
6	11	22 May 2005	7 August 2005	BBC Two	4.21
7	7	13 November 2005	12 February 2006	BBC Two	4.61
8	8	7 May 2006	30 July 2006	BBC Two	4.45
9	6	28 January 2007	4 March 2007	BBC Two	7.45
Special	1	25 July 2007		BBC Two	4.50
10	10	7 October 2007	23 December 2007	BBC Two	7.01
11	6	22 June 2008	27 July 2008	BBC Two	5.94
12	8	2 November 2008	28 December 2008	BBC Two	7.32
13	7	21 June 2009	2 August 2009	BBC Two	7.17
14	7	15 November 2009	3 January 2010	BBC Two	6.69
15	6	27 June 2010	1 August 2010	BBC Two	6.25
16	8	21 December 2010	27 February 2011	BBC Two	7.19
17	6	26 June 2011	31 July 2011	BBC Two	6.42
18	8	28 December 2011	11 March 2012	BBC Two	6.07
19	7	27 January 2013	10 March 2013	BBC Two	6.58
20	6	30 June 2013	4 August 2013	BBC Two	5.31
21	7	2 February 2014	16 March 2014	BBC Two	6.49
22	10 (Note: Episode count includes the two-episode Patagonia special which preceded the series. Out of ten originally planned episodes for the twenty-second series itself, only seven episodes were produced and broadcast before Clarkson's suspension; an eighth episode was aired months later.)	27 December 2014	28 June 2015	BBC Two	6.49
Specials	2	26 December 2015	30 December 2015	BBC Two	1.79
23	6	29 May 2016	3 July 2016	BBC Two	3.89
24	7	5 March 2017	23 April 2017	BBC Two	3.15
25	6	25 February 2018	1 April 2018	BBC Two	3.11
26	5	17 February 2019	17 March 2019	BBC Two	2.35
27	5	16 June 2019	14 July 2019	BBC Two	4.46
28	7	29 December 2019	1 March 2020	BBC Two	4.76
29	5	4 October 2020	1 November 2020	BBC One	5.68
30	4	14 March 2021	4 April 2021	BBC One	6.42
31	6	14 November 2021	24 December 2021	BBC One	5.72
32	5	5 June 2022	3 July 2022	BBC One	3.93
33	5	30 October 2022	18 December 2022	BBC One	4.39

== Episodes ==
=== Series 1 (2002) ===
No. overall	No. in series	Reviews	Features/challenges	Guest(s)	Original release date	UK viewers (millions)
1	1	Citroën Berlingo Multispace • Pagani Zonda S • Lamborghini Murciélago • Mazda6	Ford GT40 concept • Beating a speed camera • Running a car on vegetable oil	Harry Enfield	20 October 2002	2.43
2	2	Ford Focus RS • Noble M12 GTO • Ford Escort RS1800	Bus jumping over bikes	Jay Kay	27 October 2002	3.54
3	3	Mini One • Toyota Yaris Verso • Citroën DS • Aston Martin DB7 • Westfield XTR2	How car designers Peter Horbury and Ian Callum style cars • Grannies doing donuts with a Honda S2000	Ross Kemp	3 November 2002	3.30
4	4	Aston Martin Vanquish • Ferrari 575M Maranello • Family saloons: (Ford Mondeo • Toyota Avensis • Jaguar X-Type • Mercedes-Benz C-Class • BMW 3 Series • Honda Accord)	Interview with Richard Burns • Nissan Skyline R34 GT-R used car buying guide • James Bond cars for the movie Die Another Day	Steve Coogan	10 November 2002	2.90
5	5	Mercedes-Benz S-Class • Audi A8 • Maybach 62 • Bentley Arnage T	Jaguar XJ concept • Peugeot 206 used car buying guide • Budget James Bond car	Jonathan Ross	17 November 2002	3.43
6	6	Renault Vel Satis • BMW Z4 • Mercedes-Benz SL55 AMG	Honda NSX power lap • Grannies handbrake-parking a Mini • VW Golf used car buying guide	Tara Palmer-Tomkinson	24 November 2002	3.10
7	7	Saab 9-3 • Lotus Elise 111S	M4 bus lane investigation • Religion race I • Environmentally-friendly cars (Peugeot RC • Toyota Prius • Ford TH!NK) • Children's favourite supercars	Rick Parfitt	1 December 2002	3.61
8	8	Audi RS6 • Mercedes-Benz E55 AMG • Superminis: (Ford Fiesta • Citroën C3 • Honda Jazz • Nissan Micra • MG ZR) • Maserati Coupé	Tuning a Lada Riva • White van man race	Sir Michael Gambon	8 December 2002	3.43
9	9	Cars for the school run: (Renault Espace • Toyota Land Cruiser • Volvo XC90) • Subaru Forester • Volkswagen Golf R32	MG XPower SV concept • Stripping down a Jaguar XJ-S • Radical SR3 vs an aerobatic plane	Gordon Ramsay	22 December 2002	3.67
10	10	Offroaders in the countryside: (Toyota Land Cruiser Amazon • BMW X5 • Jeep Grand Cherokee • Range Rover) • Lotus Esprit V8 • TVR T350C	Top Gear Awards 2002 • Tuned German cars: (AS One • Audi TT MTM Bimoto) • Cheap used cars (Nissan Primera • Nissan 300C • Vauxhall Astra CDi) • Religion race II	None	29 December 2002	3.59

=== Series 2 (2003) ===
No. overall	No. in series	Reviews	Features/challenges	Guest(s)	Original release date	UK viewers (millions)
11	1	Smart Roadster • Bowler Wildcat • Bentley T2 • McLaren F1	Drag racer jet engine incinerates Nissan Sunny	Vinnie Jones	11 May 2003	3.15
12	2	Rolls-Royce Phantom • Rover 3½ Litre (P5B) • BMW M3 • Audi S4 • Jaguar E-Type	Fastest political party	Jamie Oliver	18 May 2003	3.28
13	3	Volkswagen Touareg • Lexus SC430 • Hyundai Coupe • BMW Z8 • Perodua Kelisa • Ford Mustang	Country with fastest supercar	David Soul	25 May 2003	2.98
14	4	Jaguar R Coupe • Jaguar Mk II • Jaguar XJR • Jaguar XKR-R • Aston Martin DB7 GT • Black Cab (Austin FX4)	How far can you drive until you become bored in a Jaguar XJR?	Boris Johnson	1 June 2003	3.23
15	5	Porsche 911 Turbo • Ford Street Ka • Triumph TR6 • Renault Clio V6 • Land Rover	Rally pit crew vs. women getting ready for a night out	Anne Robinson	8 June 2003	3.33
16	6	Subaru Impreza WRX STI • Mitsubishi Lancer Evolution VIII • Vauxhall VX220 Turbo • Peugeot 206 GTI • Fiat 500	Land speed record for caravan towing	Richard Whiteley	15 June 2003	2.46
17	7	Koenigsegg CC8S • Renault Mégane • Hummer H1 • Hummer H2 • Rolls-Royce Silver Cloud	Crash testing the Megane with a real driver	Neil Morrissey	22 June 2003	3.61
18	8	Nissan 350Z • Alfa Romeo 147 GTA • Citroën DS • Convertibles: (Citroën C3 Pluriel • Mercedes-Benz CLK500 Convertible • Audi A4 Cabriolet • Daihatsu Copen • Volkswagen Beetle Cabriolet)	The Race for the Universe	Jodie Kidd	6 July 2003	3.76
19	9	Vandenbrink Carver • Volvo S60 R • GM HyWire • Audi Quattro	Drive Vauxhall Signum from the rear seat	Patrick Stewart	13 July 2003	2.91
20	10	TVR T350C • Overfinch Range Rover • Cadillac Sixteen • Volkswagen Phaeton	Fastest disabled driver	Alan Davies	20 July 2003	2.92

=== Series 3 (2003) ===
No. overall	No. in series	Reviews	Features/challenges	Guest(s)	Original release date	UK viewers (millions)
21	1	Ford GT • BMW 5 Series • Porsche 911 GT3	Can the diesel Volkswagen Lupo get better mpg than the petrol version? • Can The Stig reach 100 mph on an aircraft carrier?	Martin Kemp	26 October 2003	3.32
22	2	BMW M3 CSL • BMW M1 • BMW M3 • BMW M5 •	Volvo 240 attempts to jump four caravans • Best 2 seater sportscar: (Porsche Boxster • BMW Z4 • Honda S2000)	Stephen Fry	2 November 2003	3.41
23	3	Bentley Continental GT • Subaru Legacy Outback	Saab 9-5 Aero versus a BAe Sea Harrier • How to Escape from a Sinking Car • Top Gear Survey	Rob Brydon	9 November 2003	4.02
24	4	Lamborghini Miura • Lamborghini Countach • Mini Cooper S Works • Lamborghini Gallardo	Lamborghini Tribute	Rich Hall	16 November 2003	4.59
25	5	Mazda RX-8 • Fiat Panda	Is the Toyota Hilux really indestructible? • Hammond searches for future classic cars	Simon Cowell	23 November 2003	4.80
26	6	Citroën C2 • Renault Mégane CC • Peugeot 307 CC • Aston Martin V8 Vantage (1977) • Holden Monaro	Is a Toyota Hilux really indestructible? – Part 2	Sanjeev Bhaskar	7 December 2003	5.40
27	7	MG XPower SV • Porsche Cayenne Turbo • Mercedes-Benz SLR McLaren	Which professor can do the best burn-out • What is the best British car: (Rover 75 • Morgan Plus 8 • Noble M12)	Rory Bremner	14 December 2003	3.35
28	8	Mercedes-Benz 280SL • Nissan Micra • Aston Martin Lagonda • Audi TT	Top Gear Generation Game	Johnny Vegas	21 December 2003	3.15
29	9	Chrysler Crossfire • Smart Roadster (Brabus V6 Bi-Turbo) • Jaguar XJ6 • Honda Civic Type R • Honda NSX Type R	Top Gear Awards 2003	Carol Vorderman	28 December 2003	4.24

=== Series 4 (2004) ===
No. overall	No. in series	Reviews	Features/challenges	Guest(s)	Original release date	UK viewers (millions)
30	1	Lotus Exige • Rover CityRover • Aston Martin DB9	Epic race: Aston Martin DB9 vs. Eurostar and TGV fast trains – Surrey to Monte Carlo • Apache Gunship helicopter vs. Lotus Exige – can the helicopter get missile lock? • James attempts to record a review of the CityRover during a test drive	Fay Ripley	9 May 2004	3.28
31	2	Mercedes-Benz SLR McLaren • Alfa Romeo 166 • Cadillac Escalade • Ford FAB-1	A nun in a monster truck • Hammond gets hypnotised	Paul McKenna	16 May 2004	3.31
32	3	Porsche 911 GT3 RS • Ferrari 360 Challenge Stradale • Dodge Charger R/T	£100 car challenge. (Volvo 760 • Audi 80 • Rover 416GTi)	Jordan	23 May 2004	3.36
33	4	Porsche Carrera GT • Audi A8 4.0 TDI • Ford SportKa	'Car darts' • Audi A8 4.0 TDI endurance challenge (London to Edinburgh and back on one tank) • Ford SportKa vs. racing pigeons • Evo vs. STi battle revised	Ronnie O'Sullivan	30 May 2004	3.24
34	5	MG ZT 260 • Hatchbacks: (Vauxhall Astra • Mazda3 • Volkswagen Golf)	Shootout: Performance sport coupes (Jaguar XK-R • BMW 645Ci • Porsche 911 Carrera 2) on the Pendine Sands • Volkswagen Golf gets electrocuted	Johnny Vaughan • Denise van Outen	6 June 2004	3.39
35	6	Renault Clio RenaultSport • Jaguar XJS • Cadillac CTS • Nissan Cube	Can you run a car on poo? Hammond Investigates.	Sir Terry Wogan	13 June 2004	3.19
36	7	Spyker C8 Spyder • Mercedes-Benz CL 65 AMG	MPVs as minicabs: (Renault Scénic • Ford C-Max)	Lionel Richie	11 July 2004	3.47
37	8	Ford GT • Maserati Quattroporte	Diesel versus Petrol hot hatch race • Blowing over cars using Boeing 747 jetblast • Tribute to the Rover V8 engine	Martin Clunes	18 July 2004	4.01
38	9	Two Seater Roadsters: (Mazda MX-5 • Toyota MR2 • Fiat Barchetta • Mercedes-Benz SL600) • Convertibles: (Mini Cooper Cabriolet • Vauxhall Tigra • Mercedes-Benz SLK350 • Audi S4 Cabriolet) • Jaguar X-Type Estate	Can you parachute into a moving car?	Sir Ranulph Fiennes	25 July 2004	4.01
39	10	Volvo V50 • Peugeot 407 • BMW X3 • Chevrolet Corvette	Hammond drives the Peugeot 407 as a pace car	Patrick Kielty	1 August 2004	3.54

=== Series 5 (2004) ===
No. overall	No. in series	Reviews	Features/challenges	Guest(s)	Original release date	UK viewers (millions)
40	1	Porsche 911 Carrera S	Can an ice cream van jump a bouncy castle? Best Muscle Car on sale (Chrysler 300C • Vauxhall Monaro VX-R • Jaguar S-Type R)	Bill Bailey	24 October 2004	3.35
41	2	Hatchbacks: (Ford Focus • Vauxhall Astra • Volkswagen Golf) • Enzo Ferrari • Supercars: (Jaguar XJ220 • Pagani Zonda • Ferrari F40 • McLaren F1 • Porsche Carrera GT)	Mountainboarder versus a rally car	Geri Halliwell	31 October 2004	3.81
42	3	Dodge Viper SRT-10	Drive a Land Rover Discovery to the top of Cnoc an Fhreiceadain in Scotland • Find the craziest car in the world • Top Gear survey 2004 results	Joanna Lumley	7 November 2004	4.41
43	4	Pagani Zonda S Roadster • Aston Martin Vanquish S • Ferrari 575M Maranello GTC	24 hours in a Smart Forfour • Playing conkers with caravans.	Jimmy Carr • Steve Coogan	14 November 2004	4.44
44	5	Morgan Aero 8 GTN • Mercedes-Benz 300SL	People carrier racing • Break 10:00 around the Nürburgring Nordschleife in a diesel car	Christian Slater • Sabine Schmitz	21 November 2004	4.69
45	6	Volkswagen Golf V GTI	How much Porsche can you get for £1,500? (Porsche 928 S • Porsche 944 • Porsche 924) • Blind man doing a power lap	Cliff Richard • Billy Baxter	5 December 2004	4.87
46	7	Toyota Prius • Ford Mustang • Mitsubishi Lancer Evolution VIII MR FQ400	A four-door Evo goes head-to-head with a Lamborghini. Top Gear Awards 2004	Roger Daltrey • James Kaye	12 December 2004	3.39
47	8	Ferrari 612 Scaglietti	Epic race: Ferrari 612 Scaglietti vs Jet Plane to Verbier • Showroom cars vs old race cars • Mitsubishi Evo vs bobsleigh • The Stig attempts a sub-1:00 power lap of the test track in a Renault F1 car	Eddie Izzard	19 December 2004	5.06
48	9	Ariel Atom • BMW 1 Series • Mercedes-Benz G55 AMG	Find a 'pearl' among a collection of cars from the Pacific Rim	Trinny Woodall • Susannah Constantine	26 December 2004	3.30

=== Series 6 (2005) ===
No. overall	No. in series	Reviews	Features/challenges	Guest(s)	Original release date	UK viewers (millions)
49	1	Mercedes-Benz CLS55 AMG • Honda Element • Toyota Aygo • Range Rover Sport	Toyota Aygo Football • Range Rover Sport vs Challenger 2 Tank	James Nesbitt	22 May 2005	4.51
50	2	Maserati MC12	Two-door coupé for less than £1,500 that isn't a Porsche (Mitsubishi Starion • BMW 635CSi • Jaguar XJ-S)	Jack Dee	29 May 2005	3.67
51	3	Aston Martin DB9 Volante • Maserati Bora • Wiesmann MF 3 • TVR Tuscan	Clarkson opens a public pool with a Rolls-Royce	Christopher Eccleston	12 June 2005	3.96
52	4	Cadillac CTS-V • BMW 320d	Presenters' mums help evaluate cars: (Peugeot 1007 • Renault Modus • Honda Jazz) • Can a stretch limo jump over the wedding party?	Omid Djalili	19 June 2005	3.45
53	5	Aston Martin DB5 • Jaguar E-Type • Nissan Murano • Maserati GranSport • Porsche Boxster S • Mercedes-Benz SLK 55 AMG	Soldiers shoot at Clarkson while he drives the Boxster S and the SLK 55 AMG to see which one is best avoiding bullets • Hammond sees if he can beat a time set by Maserati's Chief Test Driver in the GranSport	Damon Hill	26 June 2005	3.66
54	6	Mercedes-Benz SLR McLaren	Epic race to Oslo: Mercedes-Benz SLR McLaren vs. a boat • Aston Martin DBR9 lap time	David Dimbleby	3 July 2005	4.55
55	7	TVR Sagaris • Fiat Panda 4x4	Fiat Panda against a marathon runner • Sabine Schmitz attempts to beat 9:59 around the Nürburgring in a Ford Transit	Justin Hawkins • Sabine Schmitz	10 July 2005	3.75
56	8	Ferrari F430	Convertible versions of existing coupes in Iceland (Audi TT • Nissan 350Z • Chrysler Crossfire)	Tim Rice	17 July 2005	4.10
57	9	BMW M5 • Hot Hatches: (Vauxhall Astra VXR • Renault Mégane Sport 225 Trophy • Volkswagen Golf GTI)	"Road Test Russian Roulette" • World record attempt for number of times a car has rolled at high speed	Chris Evans	24 July 2005	5.18
58	10	BMW 535d • Bentley Continental Flying Spur	Driving over a lake in Iceland • What is the most fun off-road toy?	Davina McCall • Mark Webber	31 July 2005	4.92
59	11	Ford F150 SVT Lightning • Vauxhall Monaro VXR • Lamborghini Murciélago Roadster	Recreate Top Gear Theme Song using engine noises	Yasuyuki Kazama • Timothy Spall	7 August 2005	4.58

=== Series 7 (2005–06) ===
No. overall	No. in series	Reviews	Features/challenges	Guest(s)	Original release date	UK viewers (millions)
60	1	Ascari KZ1	Shootout: Performance sports coupes (Aston Martin V8 Vantage • BMW M6 • Porsche 911 Carrera S) on the Isle of Man • Top Gear survey 2005 results	Trevor Eve	13 November 2005	3.74
61	2	Porsche Cayman S • Audi RS4	Life-sized RC cars • History of British racing green • Audi RS4 vs Speed Climbers race	Ian Wright	20 November 2005	4.48
62	3	Ford Focus ST	Supercar road trip to Millau Viaduct, France (Ford GT • Pagani Zonda S • Ferrari F430 Spider)	Stephen Ladyman	27 November 2005	4.61
63	4	Pagani Zonda F • Renault Clio	Italian mid-engine supercars for less than £10,000 (Maserati Merak • Ferrari 308 GT4 • Lamborghini Urraco) • Renault Clio vs. downhill cyclist race in Lisbon	Dame Ellen MacArthur	4 December 2005	4.88
64	5	Marcos TSO • Bugatti Veyron	Epic race: Bugatti Veyron versus Cessna 182 light airplane from Alba, Italy to London • RWD vs. AWD Porsches debate: Porsche 911 Carrera 4 vs Porsche 911 Carrera 2	Nigel Mansell	11 December 2005	4.76
65	6	Volkswagen Golf R32 • BMW 130i • Mazda MX-5 • Honda NSX	Old generation vs. New generation car culture • Lap times from a video game vs. Real life in the Honda NSX • Mazda MX-5 vs. Greyhound race • Top Gear Awards 2005	David Walliams • Jimmy Carr	27 December 2005	4.52
66	7	None – Special	Top Gear Winter Olympics	None	12 February 2006	5.22

=== Series 8 (2006) ===
No. overall	No. in series	Reviews	Features/challenges	Guest(s)	Original release date	UK viewers (millions)
67	1	Koenigsegg CCX • Honda Civic • Nissan Micra C+C	The Convertible People Carrier: (Renault Espace)	Well-spoken man • Alan Davies • Trevor Eve • Jimmy Carr • Justin Hawkins • Rick Wakeman • Les Ferdinand	7 May 2006	4.75
68	2	Chevrolet Corvette Z06 • Jaguar XK vs. Germans: (Mercedes-Benz SL 350 • BMW 650i)	Tomcat 4WD vs. Motor powered kayak race in Iceland • Presenting a drive time radio show • The Stig does a farewell lap for the Suzuki Liana	Gordon Ramsay	14 May 2006	4.47
69	3	Lotus Exige S	Amphibious cars challenge: (Toyota Hilux • Volkswagen T3 • Triumph Herald)	Philip Glenister	21 May 2006	4.75
70	4	BMW Z4 M • Porsche Boxster S • Mercedes-Benz S500 • Porsche Cayenne Turbo S	Koenigsegg CCX With Top Gear Wing • Designing "Anne Hathaway's Cottage" in a Mercedes S280 • Porsche Cayenne vs. parachutist	Ewan McGregor	28 May 2006	3.83
71	5	Prodrive P2 • Citroën C6	Car football game II • Time-trial challenge with Sir Jackie Stewart	Sir Michael Gambon	4 June 2006	5.01
72	6	Cheap Saloons: (Ford Mondeo ST220 • Mazda 6 MPS • Vauxhall Vectra VXR)	Caravan holiday • Indoor speed record in an F1 racer	Brian Cox	16 July 2006	3.66
73	7	Lamborghini Gallardo Spyder • Peugeot 207 1.6L Diesel • Sporty People Carriers: (Ford S-Max 2.5L 200 PS • Mercedes-Benz B200 Turbo • Vauxhall Zafira VXR)	Caterham Seven kit car race • Peugeot 207 vs. parkour masters race in Liverpool	Steve Coogan	23 July 2006	3.89
74	8	Noble M15	Being van roadies with The Who: (Volkswagen T30 TDI 174 Sportline • Ford Transit • Renault Master) • £1,000 Van Man challenge: (Ford Transit • Suzuki Super Carry • LDV Convoy)	Jenson Button • Ray Winstone	30 July 2006	5.27

=== Series 9 (2007) ===
No. overall	No. in series	Reviews	Features/challenges	Guest(s)	Original release date	UK viewers (millions)
75	1	Jaguar XKR • Aston Martin V8 Vantage	Roadworks in 24 hours • Hammond's Vampire dragster crash aftermath	Jamie Oliver	28 January 2007	8.13
76	2	None	Bugatti Veyron to top speed at Ehra-Lessien • Shootout: Golf and Art in Coupes costing less than £25,000 (Audi TT • Mazda RX-8 • Alfa Romeo Brera).	Hugh Grant	4 February 2007	7.20
77	3	None – US Special	US Special: (Chevrolet Camaro RS • Dodge Ram 150 • Cadillac Brougham)	None	11 February 2007	6.18
78	4	Brabus S Biturbo roadster (based on a Mercedes-Benz SL65 AMG) • Porsche 911 Turbo	Reliant Robin Space Shuttle challenge	Simon Pegg	18 February 2007	7.51
79	5	Lamborghini Murciélago LP640	Railway crossing hazard video • Tractor challenge (JCB Fastrac 8250 • Case STX Steiger 530 • Fendt 930 Vario): Home-made biofuel • Top Gear survey 2006 results	Kristin Scott Thomas	25 February 2007	7.58
80	6	Shelby Mustang GT500	Stretch limos from ordinary cars (Fiat Panda • MG F • Alfa Romeo 164 & Saab 9000)	Billie Piper • Chris Moyles • Jamelia • Lemar	4 March 2007	8.12

=== Special (2007) ===
No. overall	No. in series	Title	Features/challenges	Original release date	UK viewers (millions)
81	1	Top Gear: Polar Special	Polar Special (Toyota Hilux)	25 July 2007	4.72

=== Series 10 (2007) ===
No. overall	No. in series	Reviews	Features/challenges	Guest(s)	Original release date	UK viewers (millions)
82	1	Volkswagen Golf GTI W12	Road trip to find the greatest driving road in the world: (Lamborghini Gallardo Superleggera • Porsche 911 GT3 RS • Aston Martin V8 Vantage N24)	Dame Helen Mirren	7 October 2007	6.27
83	2	Audi R8 • Porsche 911 Carrera S	Amphibious Cars Challenge II: (Nissan Navara • Volkswagen T3 Transporter • Triumph Herald)	Jools Holland	14 October 2007	5.53
84	3	Ferrari 599 GTB Fiorano • Ferrari 275 GTS • Rolls-Royce Phantom Drophead Coupé	Bugatti Veyron vs Eurofighter Typhoon race • Peel P50 around the BBC office • Lexus LS600 Auto-Parking System	Ronnie Wood • Jo Wood • Fiona Bruce • Dermot Murnaghan • John Humphrys	28 October 2007	6.73
85	4	N/A – Botswana Special	Botswana Special: (Lancia Beta Coupé • Opel Kadett • Mercedes-Benz 230E)	Ian Khama	4 November 2007	6.84
86	5	Caparo T1 • Aston Martin V8 Vantage Roadster • Mercedes-Benz GL500	London race	Simon Cowell	11 November 2007	7.74
87	6	Honda Civic Type R • Mercedes-Benz E63 AMG Estate • BMW M5 Touring • Alfa Romeo 159	Motorhome racing • Alfa Romeo 159 vs. tall man across the Humber estuary	Lawrence Dallaglio	18 November 2007	7.24
88	7	Aston Martin DBS	£1,200 British Leyland cheap-car challenge: (Rover 3500 SE • Triumph Dolomite Sprint • Princess 2200)	Jennifer Saunders	25 November 2007	6.86
89	8	Vauxhall VXR8	Renault R25 Formula One Car • Automobile history investigation • GPS satellite self-controlled BMW 330i	James Blunt • Lewis Hamilton • Anthony Hamilton	2 December 2007	8.35
90	9	Daihatsu Materia • Ascari A10 • Fiat 500	Britcar 24 Hour Endurance Race • Race: Fiat 500 vs. BMX riders through Budapest	Keith Allen	9 December 2007	7.38
91	10	Jaguar XF (X250)	German Performance Saloon cars: (Mercedes-Benz C63 AMG • BMW M3 • Audi RS4) • Top Gear Awards 2007	David Tennant	23 December 2007	7.15

=== Series 11 (2008) ===
No. overall	No. in series	Reviews	Features/challenges	Guest(s)	Original release date	UK viewers (millions)
92	1	Ferrari 430 Scuderia	£1,000 Police Car Challenge (Fiat Coupé 20v Turbo • Lexus LS400 • Suzuki Vitara) • TG Stuntman: Austin Allegro jump in reverse world record • Investigating fuel economy: 5 supercars race and BMW M3 vs Prius	Alan Carr • Justin Lee Collins	22 June 2008	6.72
93	2	Mitsubishi Lancer Evolution X • Subaru Impreza WRX STI • Audi RS6 • Mercedes-Benz CLK63 AMG Black Series	Race: Audi RS6 vs French Skiers • TG Stuntman: MG Maestro Cork-screw Jump	Rupert Penry-Jones • Peter Firth	29 June 2008	5.21
94	3	Bentley Brooklands	Cheap Car Challenge: Alfa Romeos for £1,000 (Alfa Romeo 75 3.0 V6 • Alfa Romeo GTV 2.0 • Alfa Romeo Spider)	James Corden • Rob Brydon	6 July 2008	5.78
95	4	Alfa Romeo 8C Competizione • Nissan GT-R	Epic race: Nissan GT-R vs Japanese Bullet Train	Fiona Bruce • Kate Silverton	13 July 2008	5.70
96	5	Nissan GT-R	Classic luxury limousines: (Mercedes-Benz 600 Grosser • Rolls-Royce Corniche) • Daihatsu Terios fox hunting challenge	Peter Jones • Theo Paphitis	20 July 2008	6.65
97	6	Gumpert Apollo • Mitsuoka Orochi • Mitsuoka Galue III	Showdown: The British (Top Gear) vs. The Germans (D Motor)	Jay Kay • Sabine Schmitz • Tim Schrick • Carsten van Ryssen	27 July 2008	5.59

=== Series 12 (2008) ===
No. overall	No. in series	Reviews	Features/challenges	Guest(s)	Original release date	UK viewers (millions)
98	1	Porsche 911 GT2 • Lamborghini Gallardo LP560-4	£5,000 Lorry challenge (ERF EC11 • Renault Magnum • Scania P94D)	Michael Parkinson	2 November 2008	7.74
99	2	Abarth 500 Esseesse	Muscle Car Challenge: (Dodge Challenger SRT8 • Chevrolet Corvette ZR1 • Cadillac CTS-V)	Will Young	9 November 2008	7.57
100	3	Toyota i-REAL	Tuning challenge: Renault Avantime • Finnish folk racing • Corvette V-8 engine blender-made smoothie	Mark Wahlberg • Mika Häkkinen • John Moore	16 November 2008	6.98
101	4	Pagani Zonda Roadster F • Bugatti Veyron	Economy race from Basel to Blackpool Illuminations (Volkswagen Polo BlueMotion • Jaguar XJ Diesel • Subaru Legacy Diesel)	Harry Enfield	23 November 2008	7.15
102	5	Lexus IS F • BMW M3	Portofino to Saint-Tropez Race: Powerboat vs. Ferrari Daytona • Best bus for British city streets (Leyland Olympian, Dennis Dart, Mercedes O305G, Leyland-DAB, Optare MetroRider)	Kevin McCloud • Tom Chilton	30 November 2008	7.51
103	6	Veritas RS III • Caterham Seven Superlight R500 • Ford Fiesta	Did the communists make a good car? • Ford Fiesta with the Royal Marines	Boris Johnson	7 December 2008	7.33
104	7	Tesla Roadster • Honda FCX Clarity	50 years of British Touring Car racing • TG Stuntman takes on Fifth Gear's caravan jump record • V8 Powered Rocking Chair for the elderly • Top Gear Awards 2008	Sir Tom Jones • Jay Kay • Jay Leno	14 December 2008	7.54
105	8	N/A – Vietnam Special	Vietnam Special: (Minsk • Piaggio Vespa • Honda Super Cub)	None	28 December 2008	6.70

=== Series 13 (2009) ===
No. overall	No. in series	Reviews	Features/challenges	Guest(s)	Original release date	UK viewers (millions)
106	1	Lotus Evora	Race to the North: (LNER Peppercorn Class A1 60163 Tornado steam train • Jaguar XK120 • Vincent Black Shadow) • Ferrari FXX Lap Time	Michael Schumacher (disguised as The Stig)	21 June 2009	7.86
107	2	Lamborghini Murciélago LP 670-4 SV	Perfect £2,500 car for 17-year-olds: (Volvo 940 Turbo Estate • Volkswagen Golf Mk III • Hyundai Scoupe) • Drag Race: (Mercedes-Benz SLR McLaren 722 Edition vs. Lamborghini Murciélago LP 670-4 SV) • Drag Race II: (Bugatti Veyron vs. McLaren F1)	Stephen Fry	28 June 2009	7.00
108	3	Mercedes-Benz SL65 AMG Black Series	Cheap and Cheerful car I: (Perodua Myvi • Chevrolet Aveo • Proton Satria Neo) • Cheap and Cheerful car II: (Škoda Roomster • Toyota iQ • Alfa Romeo MiTo • Fiat 500) • Gymkhana rallying on the airfield (Subaru Impreza WRX STI)	Michael McIntyre • Ken Block • Ricky Carmichael	5 July 2009	6.38
109	4	Ford Focus RS • Renault Mégane R26.R • Porsche Panamera	Race: Porsche Panamera vs. the Royal Mail service • Playing British Bulldog with live fire against the British Army in a Mitsubishi Lancer Evolution VII	Usain Bolt	12 July 2009	6.80
110	5	Jaguar XFR • BMW M5	Proof of three £1,500 rear-wheel drive coupés better than front-wheel drive: (Porsche 944 S2 • Ford Capri 2.8i • Nissan 300ZX • Morris Marina) • Clarkson's inspired greenhouse trailer design to save the world	Sienna Miller • Olivier Panis	19 July 2009	7.38
111	6	BMW Z4 sDrive35i • Nissan 370Z	Pre-1982 £3,000 classic cars for a TSD rally in Mallorca: (Austin-Healey Sprite • Citroën Ami • Lanchester LJ 200)	Brian Johnson • Madison Welch • Brian Wheeler	26 July 2009	7.69
112	7	Vauxhall VXR8 Bathurst • HSV Maloo • Audi S4 • Aston Martin V12 Vantage	Producing Volkswagen Scirocco adverts	Jay Leno	2 August 2009	7.11

=== Series 14 (2009–10) ===
No. overall	No. in series	Reviews	Features/challenges	Guest(s)	Original release date	UK viewers (millions)
113	1	BMW 760Li • Mercedes-Benz S63 AMG	Romanian GT road trip to find the Transfăgărăşan highway: (Aston Martin DBS Volante • Ferrari California • Lamborghini Gallardo LP560-4 Spyder • Dacia Sandero)	Eric Bana; Vernon Kay (voice only)	15 November 2009	6.70 (Note: 6.41 million on BBC Two, 286,000 on BBC HD)
114	2	Audi R8 V10 • Chevrolet Corvette ZR1	Build an electric car better than a G-Wiz	Michael Sheen	22 November 2009	6.48 (Note: 6.19 million on BBC Two, 285,000 on BBC HD)
115	3	Lamborghini Gallardo LP550-2 Valentino Balboni • Hawk HF3000	Fly an Airship caravan with a Lamborghini Gallardo LP550-2 Valentino Balboni • Why Lancia has made greatest number of great cars	Chris Evans	29 November 2009	6.51 (Note: 6.10 million on BBC Two, 412,000 on BBC HD)
116	4	Off Roaders: (BMW X5 M • Audi Q7 V12 TDI • Range Rover (2010MY)) • Renault Twingo 133	Airport vehicle motorsport	Guy Ritchie • Ross Kemp	6 December 2009	6.29 (Note: 6.09 million on BBC Two, 196,000 on BBC HD)
117	5	Noble M600	Make an automotive art gallery to prove cars are more popular than traditional art	Jenson Button • David Coulthard • Rupert Maas • Stephen Wiltshire	20 December 2009	6.90 (Note: 6.35 million on BBC Two, 550,000 on BBC HD)
118	6	N/A – Bolivia Special	Bolivia Special: (Range Rover • Toyota Land Cruiser • Suzuki Samurai)	None	27 December 2009	7.45 (Note: 7.07 million on BBC Two, 378,000 on BBC HD)
119	7	Lexus LFA • BMW X6 • Vauxhall Insignia VXR	'Low-budget' worldwide review of the BMW X6 • May and Margaret Calvert reflect on the evolution of UK road signs • Top Gear Awards 2009	Seasick Steve	3 January 2010	6.52 (Note: 6.05 million on BBC Two, 472,000 on BBC HD)

=== Series 15 (2010) ===
No. overall	No. in series	Reviews	Features/challenges	Guest(s)	Original release date	UK viewers (millions)
120	1	Bentley Continental Supersports	Toyota Hilux Invincible up an Icelandic volcano • Farewell to the former reasonably priced car, the Chevrolet Lacetti • A history of the Reliant 3-wheeler: (Reliant Robin)	Nick Robinson • Al Murray • Peter Jones • Peta 23 from Essex • Johnny Vaughan • Bill Bailey • Louie Spence • Amy Williams • Haraldur Sigurðsson • Phil Oakey • Peter Stringfellow • Harry Gration • Dickie Bird	27 June 2010	5.60
121	2	Porsche 911 Sport Classic • Porsche Boxster Spyder	Find a £5,000 everyday second-hand sports saloon for track days: (Mercedes-Benz 190E 2.3-16 Cosworth • BMW M3 • Ford Sierra Sapphire RS Cosworth)	Alastair Campbell	4 July 2010	6.60 (Note: 6.00 million on BBC Two, 602,000 on BBC HD.)
122	3	Chevrolet Camaro SS • Mercedes-Benz E63 AMG	Find the greatest four-door supercar: (Maserati Quattroporte GTS • Aston Martin Rapide • Porsche Panamera Turbo)	Rupert Grint • Rubens Barrichello	11 July 2010	4.58 (Note: 4.03 million on BBC Two, 549,000 on BBC HD.)
123	4	Audi R8 V10 Spyder • Porsche 911 Turbo Cabriolet	Building motorhomes: (Lotus Excel • Land Rover 110 • Citroën CX)	Andy García • Lauren McAvoy	18 July 2010	7.05 (Note: 6.47 million on BBC Two, 575,000 on BBC HD.)
124	5	Volkswagen Touareg • Bugatti Veyron Super Sport	Volkswagen Touareg vs Swedish snowmobilers • Reach 258mph (415 km/h) in the Bugatti Veyron Super Sport • Commemorating racing driver Ayrton Senna, Lewis Hamilton drives Senna's 1988 F1 racing car.	Tom Cruise • Cameron Diaz	25 July 2010	7.48 (Note: 6.65 million on BBC Two, 827,000 on BBC HD.)
125	6	Ferrari 458 Italia	Old British roadsters for £5,000: (TVR S2 • Lotus Elan • Jensen-Healey)	Jeff Goldblum	1 August 2010	6.19 (Note: 5.81 million on BBC Two, 379,000 on BBC HD.)

=== Series 16 (2010–11) ===
No. overall	No. in series	Reviews	Features/challenges	Guest(s)	Original release date	UK viewers (millions)
126	1	None	"East Coast Road Trip": (Ferrari 458 Italia • Mercedes-Benz SLS AMG • Porsche 911 GT3 RS)	Danny Boyle	21 December 2010	7.13 (Note: 6.62 million on BBC Two, 506,000 on BBC HD.)
127	2	N/A – Middle East Special	Middle East Special: (BMW Z3 • Mazda MX-5 • Fiat Barchetta)	None	26 December 2010	7.68 (Note: 6.84 million on BBC Two, 836,000 on BBC HD.)
128	3	Ariel Atom V8 • Škoda Yeti	History of the Porsche 911: Porsche 911 Turbo S Cabriolet vs Volkswagen Beetle	John Bishop • Sienna Miller • Tiff Needell	23 January 2011	7.38 (Note: 6.48 million on BBC Two, 903,000 on BBC HD.)
129	4	Ferrari 599 GTO	"Top Gear Ashes": British Hosts vs Top Gear Australia Hosts	Boris Becker • Jodie Kidd • Darryn Lyons • Steve Pizzati • Ewen Page • Shane Jacobson	30 January 2011	7.31 (Note: 6.38 million on BBC Two, 925,000 on BBC HD.)
130	5	Super Hatchbacks: (Cosworth Impreza STI CS400 • Ford Focus RS500 • Volvo C30 PCP)	"Albania Road Trip": (Rolls-Royce Ghost • Zastava/Yugo Skala (substituting for a Bentley Mulsanne) • Mercedes-Benz S65 AMG)	Jonathan Ross	6 February 2011	7.33 (Note: 6.42 million on BBC Two, 912,000 on BBC HD.)
131	6	Pagani Zonda R • Pagani Zonda Tricolore	Second-hand, four seater convertibles for £2,000: (BMW 325i Convertible)	Simon Pegg • Nick Frost	13 February 2011	7.28 (Note: 6.39 million on BBC Two, 893,000 on BBC HD.)
132	7	BMW M3 Competition Pack • Audi RS5	Convert a combine harvester into a snow plough: (Claas Dominator)	Amber Heard	20 February 2011	6.87 (Note: 5.88 million on BBC Two, 989,000 on BBC HD.)
133	8	Porsche 959 • Ferrari F40 • Jaguar XJ 5.0 V8 Supersport	Sunset to sunrise race in a Jaguar XJ 5.0 V8 Supersport across England • NASA's latest Space Exploration Vehicle	John Prescott	27 February 2011	6.53 (Note: 5.63 million on BBC Two, 902,000 on BBC HD.)

=== Series 17 (2011) ===
No. overall	No. in series	Reviews	Features/challenges	Guest(s)	Original release date	UK viewers (millions)
134	1	Marauder • BMW 1 Series M Coupe	50th Birthday of the Jaguar E-Type • Mini John Cooper Works WRC with Amy Williams	Alice Cooper • Amy Williams • Kris Meeke	26 June 2011	6.22 (Note: 5.27 million on BBC Two, 950,000 on BBC HD.)
135	2	Aston Martin Virage	High-performance hatchbacks in Lucca and around the Monaco Grand Prix track: (Citroën DS3 Racing • Fiat 500 Abarth Convertible • Renault Sport Clio 200 Cup)	Ross Noble • Flavio Briatore • Christian Horner • Bernie Ecclestone	3 July 2011	5.72 (Note: 4.84 million on BBC Two, 880,000 on BBC HD.)
136	3	McLaren MP4-12C • Range Rover Evoque	Examine toughness of the Range Rover Evoque in Las Vegas • Second-hand bargains for the price of the Nissan Pixo (Mercedes-Benz CL600 • BMW 850Ci)	Sebastian Vettel	10 July 2011	6.55 (Note: 5.41 million on BBC Two, 1.14 million on BBC HD.)
137	4	Jaguar XKR-S • Nissan GT-R	Make a train out of a specially modified car and caravans as carriages: (Jaguar XJ-S Convertible • Audi S8)	Rowan Atkinson	17 July 2011	7.14 (Note: 6.07 million on BBC Two, 1.07 million on BBC HD.)
138	5	Lotus T125 • Jensen Interceptor	Demolish a house with second-hand military equipment vs demolition experts	Bob Geldof • Jean Alesi	24 July 2011	6.13 (Note: 5.01 million on BBC Two, 1.12 million on BBC HD.)
139	6	Lamborghini Aventador	Electric cars for the seaside: (Nissan Leaf • Peugeot iOn) • Extraordinary rally team of amputee military veterans	Louis Walsh • Race2Recovery Team • Ben Collins	31 July 2011	6.76 (Note: 5.68 million on BBC Two, 1.08 million on BBC HD.)

=== Series 18 (2011–12) ===
No. overall	No. in series	Reviews	Features/challenges	Guest(s)	Original release date	UK viewers (millions)
140	—	N/A – India Special	India Special: (Jaguar XJS Celebration • Rolls-Royce Silver Shadow • Rover Mini Cooper)	David Cameron (uncredited)	28 December 2011	6.61 (Note: 5.76 million on BBC Two, 849,000 on BBC HD.)
141	1	None	"Supercars Across Italy": (Lamborghini Aventador • McLaren MP4-12C • Noble M600)	will.i.am	29 January 2012	6.21 (Note: 5.18 million on BBC Two, 1.03 million on BBC HD.)
142	2	Mercedes-Benz SLS AMG Roadster	Clarkson and May examine China's car industry in Beijing • Hammond learns about NASCAR racing in Texas	Matt LeBlanc • Jimmie Johnson • Jeff Gordon • Juan Pablo Montoya • Kyle Petty	5 February 2012	6.25 (Note: 5.29 million on BBC Two, 963,000 on BBC HD.)
143	3	Vauxhall Corsa VXR Nürburgring • Fiat Panda	Creating the climactic car chase for The Sweeney (Jaguar XFR • Ford Focus)	Ryan Reynolds • Ray Winstone • Plan B • Nick Love • Paul Anderson • Kevin Michaels	12 February 2012	6.16 (Note: 5.13 million on BBC Two, 1.03 million on BBC HD.)
144	4	Fisker Karma • Ferrari FF • Bentley Continental GT V8	Build and test off-road mobility scooters in the countryside	Michael Fassbender • Brian Johnson	19 February 2012	5.28 (Note: 4.30 million on BBC Two, 982,000 on BBC HD.)
145	5	Maserati GranTurismo MC Stradale • Mercedes-Benz C63 AMG Coupe Black Series	Retrospective on Swedish car maker Saab • Rally-spec Škoda vs jet-powered flying man	Matt Smith • Yves Rossy • Toni Gardemeister	26 February 2012	6.12 (Note: 5.25 million on BBC Two, 872,000 on BBC HD.)
146	6	"Aero-engined" Bentley, Brutus	Test of three stripped track cars: (KTM X-Bow • Caterham R500 • Morgan Three Wheeler)	Alex James	4 March 2012	5.81 (Note: 4.83 million on BBC Two, 978,000 on BBC HD.)
147	7	BMW M5	Rallycross cheaper than playing golf? (BMW 328i • Toyota MR2 • Citroën Saxo VTS) • May's childhood dream car: Ferrari 250 GT California.	Slash • Kimi Räikkönen • Chris Evans	11 March 2012	6.15 (Note: 5.13 million on BBC Two, 1.02 million on BBC HD.)

=== Series 19 (2013) ===
No. overall	No. in series	Reviews	Features/challenges	Guest(s)	Original release date	UK viewers (millions)
148	1	Pagani Huayra • Bentley Continental GT Speed	Take the Bentley Continental GT Speed to a Welsh Rally stage. • Build a car smaller than a Peel P50 (Clarkson's "P45")	Damian Lewis • Kris Meeke • The Cast of Dragons' Den (Theo Paphitis • Duncan Bannatyne • Peter Jones • Deborah Meaden)	27 January 2013	6.65 (Note: 5.47 million on BBC Two, 1.18 million on BBC HD)
149	2	None	Supercar road trip from Las Vegas, Nevada to Calexico, California: (Lexus LFA • SRT Viper • Aston Martin Vanquish)	Mick Fleetwood	3 February 2013	6.42 (Note: 5.02 million on BBC Two, 1.4 million on BBC HD.)
150	3	Toyota GT86 / Subaru BRZ • Shelby Mustang GT500	Epic race from Wembley to the San Siro stadium in Milan: Shelby Mustang GT500 vs. the pan-European rail network	Amy Macdonald	10 February 2013	6.36 (Note: 5.01 million on BBC Two, 1.35 million on BBC HD.)
151	4	Mastretta MXT • Kia Cee'd • Hot hatchbacks: (Ford Focus ST • Renault Megane RenaultSport Cup 265 • Vauxhall Astra VXR)	Rugby match with Kia Cee'ds at Twickenham	Lewis Hamilton • Matt LeBlanc • Eric Clapton • Bruce Willis	17 February 2013	5.39 (Note: 3.92 million on BBC Two, 1.39 million on BBC HD.)
152	5	Range Rover	Design a vehicle for the elderly ("Rover James"/Fiat Multipla) • Range Rover vs an autonomous military machine	James McAvoy	24 February 2013	6.45 (Note: 5.00 million on BBC Two, 1.45 million on BBC HD.)
153	6	N/A – Africa Special: Part 1	Find source of the Nile: (BMW 528i Touring • Subaru Impreza WRX Estate • Volvo 850R Estate)	None	3 March 2013	7.33 (Note: 5.85 million on BBC Two, 1.48 million on BBC HD.)
154	7	N/A – Africa Special: Part 2	Find source of the Nile: (BMW 528i Touring • Subaru Impreza WRX Estate • Volvo 850R Estate)	None	10 March 2013	7.48 (Note: 5.89 million on BBC Two, 1.59 million on BBC HD.)

=== Series 20 (2013) ===
No. overall	No. in series	Reviews	Features/challenges	Guest(s)	Original release date	UK viewers (millions)
155	1	Hot hatchbacks: (Renaultsport Clio 200 • Peugeot 208 GTi • Ford Fiesta ST)	AC45 Racing Yacht vs Toyota Corolla • Introduction of the new Reasonably Priced Car: Vauxhall Astra	Brian Johnson • Charles Dance • Warwick Davis • Joss Stone • Jimmy Carr • David Haye • Rachel Riley • Mike Rutherford • Sir Ben Ainslie	30 June 2013	5.55
156	2	Ferrari F12 Berlinetta • BAC Mono	Best taxi • Tribute to BBC Television Centre	Ron Howard	7 July 2013	5.31
157	3	None	Spanish road trip in "budget" convertibles: (McLaren MP4-12C Spider • Ferrari 458 Spider • Audi R8 V10 Spyder)	Benedict Cumberbatch	14 July 2013	4.83
158	4	Mercedes SLS AMG Black Series • Mercedes SLS AMG Electric Drive	Ford Transit hovervan	Hugh Jackman	21 July 2013	5.36
159	5	Porsche 911 Carrera S • Singer 911 • Lamborghini Aventador Roadster • Lamborghini Sesto Elemento	Best crossovers for caravanners: (Mazda CX-5 • Volkswagen Tiguan)	Steven Tyler	28 July 2013	5.29
160	6	Range Rover Sport • New Routemaster • Jaguar F-Type	Tribute to British automobile manufacturing	Mark Webber	4 August 2013	5.49

=== Series 21 (2014) ===
No. overall	No. in series	Reviews	Features/challenges	Guest(s)	Original release date	UK viewers (millions)
161	1	None	Proving that the hot hatchbacks of the presenters' youth were better than their modern equivalents: (Volkswagen Golf Mk2 GTI • Vauxhall Nova SRi • Ford Fiesta XR2i • 2S1 Gvozdika)	Hugh Bonneville	2 February 2014	6.12
162	2	Alfa Romeo 4C • McLaren P1	Alfa Romeo 4C vs Gibbs Quadski • May visits Camp Bastion in Afghanistan	Tom Hiddleston	9 February 2014	6.97
163	3	Zenvo ST1	Trip through Ukraine in three-cylinder city cars: (Volkswagen Up! • Ford Fiesta • Dacia Sandero)	James Blunt	16 February 2014	6.87
164	4	Caterham 7 160 • Caterham 7 620R • Alfa Romeo Disco Volante by Touring • Mercedes Benz G63 AMG 6x6	Proving that cars are better than motorbikes	Jack Whitehall	23 February 2014	6.53
165	5	BMW M135i • VW Golf GTI Mk7 • Porsche 918 Spyder	Making a public information film on cycle safety	Aaron Paul	2 March 2014	5.64
166	6	N/A – Burma Special Part 1	Build a bridge over the River Kwai: (Isuzu TX • Isuzu TX • Hino FB110)	None	9 March 2014	6.29
167	7	N/A – Burma Special Part 2	Build a bridge over the River Kwai: (Isuzu TX • Isuzu TX • Hino FB110)	None	16 March 2014	7.01

=== Series 22 (2014–15) ===
This was the last series to feature Clarkson, Hammond, and May as hosts, alongside Wilman as executive producer.

No. overall	No. in series	Reviews	Features/challenges	Guest(s)	Original release date	UK viewers (millions)
168	-	N/A – Patagonia Special	Drive from Bariloche to Ushuaia: (Porsche 928 GT • Lotus Esprit V8 • Ford Mustang Mach 1)	None	27 December 2014	7.21
169	-	N/A – Patagonia Special	Drive from Bariloche to Ushuaia: (Porsche 928 GT • Lotus Esprit V8 • Ford Mustang Mach 1)	None	28 December 2014	7.38
170	1	Lamborghini Huracán • Renault Twizy	Race across the urban landscape of St Petersburg	Ed Sheeran	25 January 2015	6.41
171	2	None	Australian Northern Territory road trip in GT cars: (BMW M6 Gran Coupe • Nissan GT-R • Bentley Continental GT V8S)	Kiefer Sutherland	1 February 2015	6.56
172	3	None	Homemade ambulance challenge: (Porsche 944 Turbo • Ford Scorpio Cardinal • Chevrolet G20)	Daniel Ricciardo	8 February 2015	6.14
173	4	Mercedes-AMG GT S • BMW M3 • BMW i8	Hammond pays homage to the Land Rover Defender	Margot Robbie • Will Smith	15 February 2015	6.24
174	5	Chevrolet Corvette Stingray • Porsche Cayman GTS • LaFerrari	May and Clarkson look at the weird and wonderful history of Peugeot	Olly Murs	22 February 2015	6.04
175	6	Lexus RC F • Lexus LFA	Hammond is dropped into British Columbia, Canada to test a watch with a built-in emergency beacon: (Ford F-150 Hennessey VelociRaptor • Chevrolet Silverado HD)	Gillian Anderson	1 March 2015	6.15
176	7	Jaguar F-Type R • Eagle Low Drag GT • Mazda MX-5	May competes in a world rallycross race alongside Tanner Foust (U.S. Top Gear host).	Nicholas Hoult • Tanner Foust	8 March 2015	5.84
177	8	None	Find a cheap car that still lives up to the title of classic: (Fiat 124 Spider • Peugeot 304 S Cabriolet • MGB GT) • Living the sports utility vehicle lifestyle for less than £250: (Vauxhall Frontera Sport RS • Mitsubishi Shogun Pinin • Jeep Cherokee)	None	28 June 2015	6.92

=== Specials (2015) ===
In November 2015, the BBC announced "Top Gear: From A-Z", described as a "two-part extravaganza" in the form of a clip show composed of material from the previous twenty-two series of Top Gear. It is narrated by comedian John Bishop with celebrities presenting their favourite highlights from the show; the programme did not use the Top Gear studio.

No. overall	No. special	Title	Features/challenges	Original release date	UK viewers (millions)
178	1	"From A-Z Part 1"	Top Gear clip-show introduced by celebrities	26 December 2015	1.91
179	2	"From A-Z Part 2"	Top Gear clip-show introduced by celebrities	30 December 2015	1.67

=== Series 23 (2016) ===
No. overall	No. in series	Reviews	Features/challenges	Guest(s)	Original release date	UK viewers (millions)
180	1	Ariel Nomad • Chevrolet Corvette Z06 • Dodge Viper ACR	UK vs USA Challenge: (Reliant Rialto • Land Rover Mk1 • Willys Jeep)	Jesse Eisenberg • Gordon Ramsay • Alistair Brownlee • Jonathan Brownlee	29 May 2016	6.42
181	2	McLaren 675LT	Ultimate SUV test: (Jaguar F-Pace • Porsche Macan • Mercedes-Benz GLC)	Jenson Button • Damian Lewis • Seasick Steve • Tinie Tempah • Sharleen Spiteri	5 June 2016	4.06
182	3	Audi R8 • Ferrari F12 TDF • SuperHatches: (Ford Focus RS • Honda Civic Type R • Mercedes AMG A45)	London tour in Ken Block's Hoonicorn	Ken Block • Anthony Joshua • Kevin Hart	12 June 2016	3.44
183	4	Tesla Model X • Aston Martin Vulcan	Venice "cheap car vs. luxury train" race: (Jaguar XJ Exec • Honda Gold Wing • Audi A8)	Darren Turner • Tom Kerridge • Tom Kitchin • Ollie Dabbous • Oliver Peyton • India Fisher • Bear Grylls • Brian Cox	19 June 2016	3.22
184	5	BMW M2 • Zenos E10 S • Rolls-Royce Dawn • Jaguar F-Type SVR	Modern Rolls vs. Classic Rolls: People of Dingle vote on best: (Rolls-Royce Corniche • Rolls-Royce Dawn) • Delivering the F-Type SVR to the Geneva Motor Show	Jennifer Saunders • Paul Hollywood • Norman Dewis	26 June 2016	3.57
185	6	Ford Mustang GT • Ford Mustang EcoBoost • Honda NSX • Porsche 911 R	Classic cars with modern technology (Aston Martin DB5 • Eagle E-Type • MGB Roadster)	Patrick Dempsey • Greg Davies	3 July 2016	2.64

=== Series 24 (2017) ===
No. overall	No. in series	Reviews	Features/challenges	Guest(s)	Original release date	UK viewers (millions)
186	1	Ferrari FXX-K	Race across Kazakhstan in three high-mileage cars: (Volvo V70 • Mercedes-Benz E-Class (W210) • Black Cab)	James McAvoy	5 March 2017	3.77
187	2	Alfa Romeo Giulia Quadrifoglio	US road trip in two convertible supercars: (Porsche 911 Turbo S Cabriolet • Lamborghini Huracán Spyder)	David Tennant	12 March 2017	3.60
188	3	Aston Martin DB11 • Volkswagen Golf GTI Clubsport S • Abarth 124 Spider	DB11 vs Mercedes-AMG S63 Coupé Bond Style • Clubsport S: "Supercar hunting" at the Nürburgring	Tamsin Greig	19 March 2017	3.13
189	4	Bugatti Chiron • Renault Twingo GT	Epic race across Arabian Peninsula: Chiron vs. alternative "money-no-object" transportation • Twingo arcade game challenge	Tinie Tempah	26 March 2017	3.17
190	5	Ford GT	Extreme off-road buggy race on the California desert	Chris Hoy	2 April 2017	3.27
191	6	Mercedes-AMG GT R	Road trip across Cuba with second-hand sports cars: (Maserati Biturbo • Chevrolet Camaro)	Ross Noble	16 April 2017	2.40
192	7	Porsche 718 Cayman S • Avtoros Shaman	Turning a SsangYong Rodius into a luxury yacht	Jay Kay	23 April 2017	2.69

=== Series 25 (2018) ===
No. overall	No. in series	Reviews	Features/challenges	Guest(s)	Original release date	UK viewers (millions)
193	1	None	Road trip across Utah's Wild West in V8 sports cars: (Hennessey Ford Shelby Mustang GT350 R • Jaguar F-Type SVR • McLaren 570GT)	Rob Brydon • Ken Block	25 February 2018	3.50
194	2	McLaren 720S	720S v. McLaren P1 • Off road toys in California to find Bigfoot • Racing in Reverse	Lee Mack	4 March 2018	3.04
195	3	Lexus LC500 • Honda Civic Type R	Second-hand sports cars across Honshu: (Nissan Skyline GTT • Mazda RX-7) • Weirdest Japanese car culture	None	11 March 2018	2.93
196	4	Dodge Challenger Demon • Kia Stinger GT-S • Hyundai i30N	Harris' tribute to the Citroën 2CV	Dara Ó Briain • Ed Byrne	18 March 2018	3.26
197	5	Ferrari 812 Superfast • Chevrolet Camaro ZL1 1LE	Building the world's fastest tractor	Vicky McClure	25 March 2018	2.97
198	6	Alpine A110	Best Modern SUV: (Alfa Romeo Stelvio • Range Rover Velar • Volvo XC60)	Jason Manford	1 April 2018	2.97

=== Series 26 (2019) ===
No. overall	No. in series	Reviews	Features/challenges	Guest(s)	Original release date	UK viewers (millions)
199	1	Suzuki Ignis	Fast Estate Cars in Norway: (Porsche Panamera Turbo Sport Turismo • Ferrari GTC4Lusso) • Ignis vs Fiat Panda Cross up Gurlet Hill	James Marsden	17 February 2019	2.61
200	2	BMW M5 • Mercedes-Benz E63 AMG S	Tuk-Tuk Trip across Sri Lanka	Professor Green	24 February 2019	2.27
201	3	Bentley Continental GT • Mégane Renault Sport • Porsche 911 GT2 RS	Continental GT vs Speed 8	Gregory Porter	3 March 2019	2.28
202	4	None	Second Hand Luxury Car Challenge: (Rolls-Royce Silver Shadow • Mercedes-Benz 600SEL • Bentley Turbo R)	Matt Baker	10 March 2019	2.20
203	5	Aston Martin V8 Vantage • Rolls-Royce Phantom • Ford Fiesta ST	Fiesta ST vs. Lamborghini Aventador S • Automatic Brake Testing	Stephen Mangan	17 March 2019	2.40

=== Series 27 (2019) ===
No. overall	No. in series	Reviews	Features/challenges	Guest(s)	Original release date	UK viewers (millions)
204	1	Ferrari 488 Pista • McLaren 600LT	Ethiopian adventure in the presenters' first cars (Mini • Porsche Boxster • Ford Escort Mk2)	None	16 June 2019	4.81
205	2	Tesla Model 3	Building budget battery powered sports cars (Triumph Spitfire • Subaru Brat • Nissan Leaf)	Danny Boyle • Himesh Patel	23 June 2019	4.64
206	3	Dallara Stradale	Turning a Daimler Hearse into the ultimate family car	Damon Hill • Zara Tindall • Mike Tindall	30 June 2019	4.44
207	4	Rolls-Royce Cullinan	Rare cheap cars across Borneo (Austin Allegro • Matra Bagheera)	Bob Mortimer	7 July 2019	4.63
208	5	Toyota Supra	Iceland's Formula Off Road • Tribute to the Lotus 79	Will Young • Peter Wright • Mario Andretti • Clive Chapman	14 July 2019	3.77

=== Series 28 (2019–20) ===
No. overall	No. in series	Reviews	Features/challenges	Guest(s)	Original release date	UK viewers (millions)
209	—	N/A – Nepal Special	Driving from Kathmandu to Lo Manthang (Peugeot 106 Rallye • Renault 4 • Hulas Mustang)	None	29 December 2019	3.72
210	1	Ariel Atom 4	Best Convertibles for less than £600 (Ford Escort Cabriolet • Mercedes-Benz SLK • Chrysler LeBaron) • Bungee jumping a Rover Metro	None	26 January 2020	5.22
211	2	McLaren Speedtail	Building a Cheap Off-Roader to compete with the Land Rover Defender • McLaren Speedtail vs RAF F-35B	Romesh Ranganathan	2 February 2020	4.90
212	3	Porsche Taycan	American Cars in Peru (Pontiac Firebird • Dodge Dart • Volkswagen Campervan • Oldsmobile Cutlass)	None	9 February 2020	5.24
213	4	Renault Mégane RS Trophy R • Porsche 718 Cayman GT4 • Lamborghini Gallardo Spyder	Racing the Baja 1000	Emilia Fox • Laurence Fox	16 February 2020	4.45
214	5	Volkswagen I.D. R	Best Exotic European Sports Car (Ferrari Portofino • Porsche 911 Carrera S • Aston Martin V8 Vantage)	KSI • Damon Hill	23 February 2020	5.11
215	6	BMW M8	Tribute to Colin McRae • Fastest Emergency service	Tom Allen • Jimmy McRae • David Richards • Carlos Sainz	1 March 2020	4.68

=== Series 29 (2020) ===
No. overall	No. in series	Reviews	Features/challenges	Original release date	UK viewers (millions)
216	1	Ferrari SF90 Stradale	Spending 24 Hours in Company Saloons (Volvo S60 • Tesla Model 3 • BMW 3 Series)	4 October 2020	5.40
217	2	None	Original 200mph Supercars in Yorkshire (Jaguar XJ220 • Lamborghini Diablo • Ferrari F40) • Performance Insurance Write Offs (Maserati Quattroporte • Porsche Cayman S • Ford Focus RS)	11 October 2020	5.05
218	3	Lamborghini Urus • Audi RS6	Cheap Hire Cars in Cyprus (Suzuki Jimny • Ford Focus CC • Kia Picanto)	18 October 2020	6.04
219	4	None	Welsh roadtrip in New British GTs (McLaren GT • Aston Martin DBX • Bentley Flying Spur)	25 October 2020	5.85
220	5	Mini Electric • Vauxhall Corsa-e • Honda e	Building an Electric All-Terrain Ice cream van	1 November 2020	6.06

=== Series 30 (2021) ===
No. overall	No. in series	Reviews	Features/challenges	Original release date	UK viewers (millions)
221	1	Lamborghini Sián FKP 37	Second-Hand Dad's Cars in the Lake District (Ford Cortina • BMW 3 Series • Ford Fiesta)	14 March 2021	6.33
222	2	Ferrari Roma • Alfaholics GTA-R	Budget James Bond Cars (Sunbeam Alpine • Alfa Romeo GTV6 • Renault 5 1/2 • Lotus Esprit • Toyota 2000GT • Aston Martin DB5) • Spark ODYSSEY 21 vs. Jet Pack Man	21 March 2021	7.03
223	3	None	Off-Roaders in the Scottish Highlands (Ariel Nomad R • Land Rover Defender • Mercedes-AMG G63)	28 March 2021	6.30
224	4	Toyota GR Yaris	Second-Hand Sports Cars for a Midlife crisis (TVR Chimaera • Vauxhall Monaro • Ferrari F355/Toyota MR2 Kit car)	4 April 2021	6.00

=== Series 31 (2021) ===
No. overall	No. in series	Reviews	Features/challenges	Original release date	UK viewers (millions)
225	1	None	British Grand Prix showdown in F1-inspired track day cars (McLaren 765LT • Alfa Romeo Giulia GTAm • Aston Martin Vantage F1 Edition) • Tribute to Eddie Kidd	14 November 2021	6.22
226	2	Lamborghini Huracán STO	Futuristic Caravans with electric SUVs (Audi e-Tron Sportback • Mercedes-Benz EQC • Polestar 2)	21 November 2021	5.85
227	3	Chevrolet Corvette	Icelandic rally expedition in second-hand British cars (Vauxhall Chevette • Rolls-Royce Silver Shadow • Range Rover • Ford F-150 Arctic Trucks)	28 November 2021	6.14
228	4	Aston Martin Victor	Flintoff becomes a qualified racing driver • History of the DMC DeLorean	5 December 2021	5.63
229	5	None	Old cars for new drivers (Lada Niva • MGB GT • Volkswagen Beetle) • Tribute to the Lamborghini Miura	12 December 2021	6.30
230	—	N/A – "Driving Home for Christmas" Special	Driving from Bethlehem, Wales to the Top Gear test track (Citroen BX 4x4 GTi • Ford Escort XR3i • Range Rover)	24 December 2021	4.15

=== Series 32 (2022) ===
No. overall	No. in series	Reviews	Features/challenges	Original release date	UK viewers (millions)
231	1	None	Motorsport road trip across Florida	5 June 2022	4.45
232	2	None	Classic and future TV cop cars (Ford Gran Torino • Ferrari 308 GTS • Jaguar Mark 2 • Dodge Charger SRT Hellcat Widebody • Ford F-150 Raptor • Audi RS 3) • Turning a Sinclair C5 into a bobsleigh	12 June 2022	3.86
233	3	Lotus Emira	The presenters become HGV drivers (Scania 770S • Mercedes-Benz Actros• DAF XG+)	19 June 2022	4.09
234	4	Maserati MC20 • Rivian R1T	Reliable used cars for less than £500 (Mini Cooper • Volvo V70 • Mercedes C220 CDI • Honda Civic • Toyota Celica • Mazda 323F)	26 June 2022	3.96
235	5	Ford Puma ST • Ford Puma Rally1	1920s-style motorsport • History of BMW M cars • The future of fuel	3 July 2022	3.30

=== Series 33 (2022) ===
This is the last series of Top Gear to air due to production indefinitely going on hiatus in 2023, due to presenter Freddie Flintoff being injured whilst filming for the planned 34th series.

No. overall	No. in series	Reviews	Features/challenges	Original release date	UK viewers (millions)
236	1	Rimac Nevera	Road trip across Thailand in second-hand pickup trucks (Toyota Hilux • Isuzu D-Max • BMW E30)	30 October 2022	4.86
237	2	None	Supercar road trip through Germany and Austria (Ferrari 296 GTB • Porsche 718 Cayman GT4 RS • Pagani Huayra Roadster BC) • Treasure hunt around Paris in microcars (Citroen Ami • Carver • City Transformer)	6 November 2022	4.49
238	3	Mercedes-AMG ONE • Range Rover	F1 stock car racing	13 November 2022	4.57
239	4	Honda Civic Type-R • Peugeot 205 GTI	Team Top Gear at the GT Cup	20 November 2022	4.40
240	5	Ferrari Daytona SP3	Best delivery van for less than £3000 (Ford Transit • Vauxhall Astra • Volkswagen Caddy) • Best family car to buy today	18 December 2022	3.59

== Ratings ==
Top Gear : UK viewers per episode (millions)
Audience measurement performed by Broadcasters' Audience Research Board
