= Top Gear series 29 =

Series of a 2002 British TV show

Top Gear
- Series 29
- Starring: Freddie Flintoff; Chris Harris; Paddy McGuinness; The Stig
- No. of episodes: 5

Release
- Original network: BBC One
- Original release: 4 October – 1 November 2020

Series chronology
- ← Previous; Series 28 Next → Series 30

Series 29 of Top Gear, a British motoring magazine and factual television programme, was broadcast on BBC One during 2020, consisting of five episodes between 4 October and 1 November. The COVID-19 pandemic affected production of the series, with several changes made as a result—studio segments were filmed on an outdoor set with social distancing maintained between presenters, audience members and production staff, the celebrity segment was dropped, and most films were recorded within Britain; a single international film was created, but this was produced in February 2020.

This series' highlights included the presenters making their own home-made ice cream van, enduring a 24-hour challenge with saloon cars, motoring challenges involving cheap hire cars in Cyprus, and a tribute to racing legend Stirling Moss.

== Production ==
On 10 February 2020, it was announced that a twenty-ninth series of Top Gear had begun filming and would air on BBC One, being the first series of the show to do so. On 16 May 2020, it was announced that, due to the COVID-19 pandemic, the series would not feature international films (with the exception of the Cyprus rental car challenge, which was filmed in February 2020); instead the show would film in and around the UK.

On 9 September 2020, it was announced that the show would feature a new drive in studio on the runway at Dunsfold, to ensure that audience members were physically distanced during filming. This series was the last series to have its studio segments filmed at Dunsfold Aerodrome as had been the case since 2002. Television Centre, London was used for filming studio segments from the thirtieth series onwards.

For this series the Star in a Reasonably Fast Car segment was dropped to maintain social distancing.

== Episodes ==
No. overall	No. in series	Reviews	Features/challenges	Original release date	UK viewers (millions)
216	1	Ferrari SF90 Stradale	Spending 24 Hours in Company Saloons (Volvo S60 • Tesla Model 3 • BMW 3 Series)	4 October 2020	5.40
217	2	None	Original 200mph Supercars in Yorkshire (Jaguar XJ220 • Lamborghini Diablo • Ferrari F40) • Performance Insurance Write Offs (Maserati Quattroporte • Porsche Cayman S • Ford Focus RS)	11 October 2020	5.05
218	3	Lamborghini Urus • Audi RS6	Cheap Hire Cars in Cyprus (Suzuki Jimny • Ford Focus CC • Kia Picanto)	18 October 2020	6.04
219	4	None	Welsh roadtrip in New British GTs (McLaren GT • Aston Martin DBX • Bentley Flying Spur)	25 October 2020	5.85
220	5	Mini Electric • Vauxhall Corsa-e • Honda e	Building an Electric All-Terrain Ice cream van	1 November 2020	6.06

== "Best Of" Compilation Special ==
A compilation of the fastest cars; Chris Harris heads to Italy to test the Ferrari SF90; the team test the battery operated Honda E, Vauxhall Corsa E and Mini electric; a tribute to the late Sir Sterling Moss.

No. overall	No. in series	Reviews	Features/challenges	Original release date	UK viewers (millions)
Compilation	Compilation	Ferrari SF90	The team tests the (Honda e • Vauxhall Corsa E • Mini Electric) • Tribute to Stirling Moss	29 November 2020	N/A
