= Top Gear series 31 =

Series of a 2002 British TV show

Top Gear
- Series 31
- Starring: Freddie Flintoff; Chris Harris; Paddy McGuinness; The Stig
- No. of episodes: 6

Release
- Original network: BBC One
- Original release: 14 November – 24 December 2021

Series chronology
- ← Previous; Series 30 Next → Series 32

Series 31 of Top Gear, a British motoring magazine and factual television programme, was broadcast on BBC One and BBC One HD during late 2021. It was the fifth series to feature the presenting line-up of Paddy McGuinness, Freddie Flintoff and Chris Harris and the third to be broadcast on BBC One. This series saw the retention of the outdoor studio set at Television Centre, London from the previous series.

The series' highlights included an expedition across Iceland in old British cars, finding old used cars for new drivers, and a tribute to Eddie Kidd OBE.

== Episodes ==
No. overall	No. in series	Reviews	Features/challenges	Original release date	UK viewers (millions)
225	1	None	British Grand Prix showdown in F1-inspired track day cars (McLaren 765LT • Alfa Romeo Giulia GTAm • Aston Martin Vantage F1 Edition) • Tribute to Eddie Kidd	14 November 2021	6.22
226	2	Lamborghini Huracán STO	Futuristic Caravans with electric SUVs (Audi e-Tron Sportback • Mercedes-Benz EQC • Polestar 2)	21 November 2021	5.85
227	3	Chevrolet Corvette	Icelandic rally expedition in second-hand British cars (Vauxhall Chevette • Rolls-Royce Silver Shadow • Range Rover • Ford F-150 Arctic Trucks)	28 November 2021	6.14
228	4	Aston Martin Victor	Flintoff becomes a qualified racing driver • History of the DMC DeLorean	5 December 2021	5.63
229	5	None	Old cars for new drivers (Lada Niva • MGB GT • Volkswagen Beetle) • Tribute to the Lamborghini Miura	12 December 2021	6.30
230	—	N/A – "Driving Home for Christmas" Special	Driving from Bethlehem, Wales to the Top Gear test track (Citroen BX 4x4 GTi • Ford Escort XR3i • Range Rover)	24 December 2021	4.15
