= Hulas Motors =

Nepalese automobile manufacturer

Hulas Motors Pvt. Ltd
- Industry: Automotive
- Founded: 1997
- Headquarters: Biratnagar, Nepal
- Products: Commercial vehicles
- Website: hulasmotors.com

Hulas Motors Pvt. Ltd. is the only commercial vehicle manufacturer in Nepal, manufacturing light commercial vehicles (LCV) as well as Mini Utility Vehicles (MUV). Hulas Motors Pvt. Ltd. was established in 1997. It is a subsidiary of Golchha Organization, one of the largest manufacturing companies in Nepal. The designs of Sherpa, Mustang and Mini V are all indigenous to Nepal. The complete R&D is done in house. Hulas Motors has a strategic alliance with its sister concern, Hulas Steel Industries which provides it with engineering and mechanical support. The company has sold 1,400 vehicles in Nepal as of 2015.

The Prime Minister of Nepal from 2011 to 2013, Baburam Bhattarai, used a Hulas Mustang Max as his official vehicle.

In 2015, the executives of Hulas Motors announced the discontinuation of notable production vehicles, like the Hulas Mustang, and the Hulas Sherpa utility vehicles. The reason behind the discontinuation was that two years prior, the Nepalese government had ordered the company to upgrade the engines to Euro III standards, up from Euro I. The executives say that they could not find a suitable Euro III standard engine, exhibiting high performance in both normal and hilly roads before the deadline expired. They also lobbied for the government to extend the expiry date of the deadline they had to meet. The new standards had also resulted in the cancellation of the planned jeep Hulas Bravo.

On July 8, 2016, it was announced that Hulas Motors had begun the production of an all-electric passenger car, and is currently undergoing testing in various areas of Nepal, including Kathmandu city, and other rural and hilly areas. The electric car is said to be priced at NRs 14 to 15 lakh or NRs 1.4 to 1.5 million. The car is said to have various features like power windows, power lock system, power steering system, and an air conditioning system.

The Hulas Mustang had been featured on Top Gear in 2019 as part of the Nepal Special episode.

Current models include:

- Hulas Cargo
- Hulas E-Rickshaw
- Hulas Da Vinci

Former models include:

- Hulas Mini-ev
- Hulas Mini-V
- Hulas Mustang Max
- Hulas Mustang V2
- Hulas Sherpa
