= Top Gear series 30 =

Series of a 2002 British TV show

Top Gear
- Series 30
- Starring: Freddie Flintoff; Chris Harris; Paddy McGuinness; The Stig
- No. of episodes: 4

Release
- Original network: BBC One
- Original release: 14 March – 4 April 2021

Series chronology
- ← Previous; Series 29 Next → Series 31

Series 30 of Top Gear, a British motoring magazine and factual television programme, was broadcast on BBC One and BBC One HD during early 2021. It was the fourth series to feature the presenting lineup of Paddy McGuinness, Freddie Flintoff and Chris Harris and the second to be broadcast on BBC One. As with the previous series, the COVID-19 pandemic affected production and filming of this series, with several changes made as a result; studio segments were filmed on an outdoor set with no full audience.

The series' highlights included the presenters taking a road trip across the Lake District in their dads' cars, driving some of the cars from the James Bond franchise, and a challenge involving cars for a midlife crisis.

== Production ==
On 28 February 2021, it was announced that, due to restrictions as a result of the COVID-19 pandemic, filming of the studio links for the thirtieth series would not be taking place at its usual location at Dunsfold Aerodrome, and there would not be a studio audience present; the number of episodes in the series was also reduced to four. Instead, the links for the show were recorded during a two-night shoot outside Television Centre, London with no full audience present. (Note: Filming took place in front of production staff and the residents of the flats above Television Centre, as explained at the start of the first episode.) Unlike during the previous series, the presenters and crew members did not need to be physically distanced during filming as they were "bubbled" and tested during filming.

== Episodes ==
No. overall	No. in series	Reviews	Features/challenges	Original release date	UK viewers (millions)
221	1	Lamborghini Sián FKP 37	Second-Hand Dad's Cars in the Lake District (Ford Cortina • BMW 3 Series • Ford Fiesta)	14 March 2021	6.33
222	2	Ferrari Roma • Alfaholics GTA-R	Budget James Bond Cars (Sunbeam Alpine • Alfa Romeo GTV6 • Renault 5 1/2 • Lotus Esprit • Toyota 2000GT • Aston Martin DB5) • Spark ODYSSEY 21 vs. Jet Pack Man	21 March 2021	7.03
Note: This episode was posthumously dedicated to former presenter Sabine Schmitz, who died from cancer on 16 March 2021.
223	3	None	Off-Roaders in the Scottish Highlands (Ariel Nomad R • Land Rover Defender • Mercedes-AMG G63)	28 March 2021	6.30
224	4	Toyota GR Yaris	Second-Hand Sports Cars for a Midlife crisis (TVR Chimaera • Vauxhall Monaro • Ferrari F355/Toyota MR2 Kit car)	4 April 2021	6.00

== A Tribute To Sabine Schmitz ==
Former presenter Sabine Schmitz died from cancer on 16 March 2021, two days after the first episode of the series was aired; following the broadcast of the final episode of the series on 4 April 2021, a special tribute to her was made available on BBC iPlayer. The tribute, which was shown on BBC One on 7 April 2021 and features clips from Schmitz's appearances on Top Gear, was narrated by Zoe Ball and contains contributions from some of the current and former presenters of the show (these are Jeremy Clarkson, Richard Hammond, James May, Matt LeBlanc, Rory Reid, Chris Harris, Paddy McGuinness, and Freddie Flintoff), as well as several other figures from the world of motorsport.

No. overall	No. in series	Title	Original release date	UK viewers (millions)
Special	Special	Top Gear: A Tribute To Sabine Schmitz	7 April 2021	3.57
