= List of Top Gear home video releases =

Since 2002, DVDs and Blu-ray Discs of the British TV series Top Gear have been released, containing full episodes, compilations, or specially filmed material.

Many episodes are not presented as the original broadcast, and are included as either abridged 50 minute versions or "Director's Cuts" with unbroadcast deleted scenes reinstated. Changes to the soundtrack are also common when the original music is not licensed for home video. Outside of the US and UK DVD releases, a heavily-edited version of series 9 was released in Germany in 2012, and Series 6 onwards have been released for digital purchase in near-uncut versions with the exception of a few episodes.

Series 2-3, 6, 10-22 & 25-27 were released in Japan on DVD for a very brief period of time by Assist-Corp in 2019, but due to poor reliability in DVD players, the BBC would revoke their licence to produce DVDs featuring their intellectual property.

== Releases ==
Title	UK Date	AU Date	USA Date	Notes
Complete Series
Series 10	25 October 2010 ^{(D)}	—N/a	21 April 2009 ^{(D)}	Also includes the Botswana Special. American release titled The Complete Season 10.
Series 11	25 April 2011 ^{(D)}	—N/a	12 January 2010 ^{(D)}	American release titled The Complete Season 11.
The Complete Season 12	—N/a	—N/a	12 January 2010 ^{(D)}	Also includes the Vietnam Special. Bonus: audio commentaries from The Great Adventures 2.
Series 13	8 August 2011 ^{(D)}	—N/a	28 September 2010 ^{(D)}	Bonus (USA only): extras originally included on The Challenges 5 and The Great Adventures 2. American release titled The Complete Season 13.
Series 14	23 April 2012 ^{(D)}	—N/a	15 February 2011 ^{(D,B)}	Bonus (American release): Bolivia Special, Polar Special, Celebrity Laps and Featurettes. The American release is titled The Complete Season 14.
Series 15	20 August 2012 ^{(D)}	—N/a	15 February 2011 ^{(D,B)}	Bonus (American release): Featurettes (Bentley Continental Supersports: The Stig's Lap, James Cooks Volcano Lunch, James Checks Tire Pressure on Hilux, Porsche 911 Sports Classic: The Stig's Lap, Presenters End of Series Chat), Celebrity Laps, James May's Journey, Outtakes. The American release is titled The Complete Season 15.
Series 16	1 October 2012 ^{(D)}	—N/a	9 August 2011 ^{(D,B)}	Bonus (American release): Middle East Special, USA Road Trip, Pre-Series Chat, Behind the Scenes – Top Gear Production Office and Studio, Bishop Celebrity Lap, Nick Frost and Simon Pegg Laps, John Prescott – Jezza vs. Prezza, Clarkson and Hammond Joking About James' Death, End of Series 16 Chat. The American release is titled The Complete Season 16.
Series 17	1 October 2012 ^{(D)}	—N/a	28 February 2012 ^{(D,B)}	Bonus (American release): Top Gear USA: Season 1 Episode 6, Behind the Scenes Chats, James Tests the Nissan GT-R Launch Control, New Series Intro and End of Series Chat with Clarkson & May, Celebrity Lap Extended Scenes. The American release is titled The Complete Season 17.
The Complete Season 18	—N/a	—N/a	12 June 2012 ^{(D)}	Also includes India Special.
Series 19 and 20	9 September 2013 ^{(D)}	—N/a	—N/a	Includes Africa Special (parts one and two).
The Complete Season 19	—N/a	—N/a	14 May 2013 ^{(D)}	Includes Africa Special (parts one and two).
The Complete Season 20	—N/a	—N/a	14 January 2014 ^{(D)}	
The Complete Season 21	—N/a	—N/a	5 August 2014 ^{(D)}	Also includes Burma Special (parts one and two).
The Complete Season 22	—N/a	—N/a	19 April 2016 ^{(D)}	Also includes Patagonia Special (parts one and two).
Series 23	25 July 2016 ^{(D,B)}	—N/a	11 April 2017 ^{(D,B)}	Also includes Extra Gear: Series One. American release titled The Complete Season 23.
Season 24	—N/a	—N/a	6 February 2018 ^{(D)}	
Season 25	—N/a	—N/a	14 August 2018 ^{(D)}	
Specials
Winter Olympics Special	5 June 2006 ^{(D)}	5 July 2006 ^{(D)}	—N/a	Bonus: Out-takes, additional footage of the Stig's training regimen.
The Great Adventures	3 March 2008 ^{(D)}	2 October 2012 ^{(D)}	—N/a	A boxed release of the Polar Special (72 minute "Director's Cut"), and the US Special (abridged 50 minute version). Australian release re-titled "Top Gear Double Pack: Polar Special/US Special".
The Great Adventures: US Special	—N/a	7 August 2008 ^{(D)}	—N/a	Abridged 50 minute version.
The Polar Special: The Director's Cut	20 October 2008 ^{(B)}	5 June 2008 ^{(D)} 2 November 2008 ^{(B)}	—N/a	72 minute "Director's Cut"
The Great Adventures 2	23 March 2009 ^{(D)}	2 December 2010 ^{(D)}	—N/a	Botswana Special (66 minute "Director's Cut") and Vietnam Special. Bonus: audio commentary on both specials with producer Andy Wilman and crew, deleted scenes, and photo galleries. Australian release re-titled 'Top Gear Double Pack: Vietnam Special/Botswana Special'.
The Great Adventures: Vietnam Special	—N/a	4 June 2009 ^{(D)}	—N/a	Bonus: audio commentary with producer Andy Wilman and crew, deleted scenes, and photo gallery.
The Great Adventures: Botswana Special	—N/a	6 July 2009 ^{(D)}	—N/a	Bonus: audio commentary with producer Andy Wilman and crew, deleted scenes, and photo gallery.
The Great Adventures 3	22 March 2010 ^{(D,B)}	3 June 2010 ^{(D,B)}	—N/a	Bolivia Special (86 minute "Director's Cut"), Romania (44 minute "Director's Cut") and Bonneville (41 minute "Director's cut"). Bonus: commentary on Bolivia Special with James May, Producer Andy Wilman and crew, and photo galleries. Australian release re-titled 3 Great Adventures.
The Great Adventures 4	29 March 2011 ^{(D,B)}	2 June 2011 ^{(D,B)}	—N/a	Middle East Special (84 minute "Director's Cut"), Series 16 USA Road Trip (52 minute "Director's Cut"), and the Albanian Challenge (33 minute "Director's Cut"). Bonus: Deleted Scenes, commentary from James May and crew on the Middle East Special (TV Version).
The Great Adventures 5	26 March 2012 ^{(D,B)}	7 June 2012 ^{(D,B)}	—N/a	India Special and Supercars Across Italy challenge. Bonus: audio commentary from James May and crew on the India Special, Extra Stig laps, Additional high speed run footage, Deleted Scenes on 'Supercars Across Italy'.
50 Years of Bond Cars	18 February 2013 ^{(D)}	6 March 2013 ^{(D)}	—N/a	
The Great African Adventure	3 June 2013 ^{(D,B)}	7 August 2013 ^{(D,B)}	—N/a	Africa Special (parts one and two). Bonus: deleted scenes.
The Burma Special	2 June 2014 ^{(D,B)}	6 August 2014 ^{(D,B)}	—N/a	'Extended Edition' of Parts One and Two with "35 minutes of unseen footage".
The Patagonia Special	30 March 2015 ^{(D,B)}	30 March 2015 ^{(D,B)}	—N/a	Omnibus of both parts. Also includes Australian Road Trip (55 minute "Director's Cut").
Compilations
Back in the Fast Lane: The Best of Series One & Two	27 October 2003 ^{(D)}	7 February 2007 ^{(D)}	—N/a	95 minute compilation of highlights from Series One and Two. The features are heavily truncated from their original versions. A preview disc, "Back in the Fast Lane – Highlights from Series One & Two", was given away with Top Gear Magazine the previous month.
Revved Up: Thrashing, Crashing and Trashing	6 June 2005 ^{(D)}	2 February 2006 ^{(D)}	—N/a	105 minute compilation of highlights from Series Three, Four and Five, plus unaired footage. A preview disc, "The Best of Revved Up", was given away with Top Gear Magazine the previous month
The Challenges	21 May 2007 ^{(D)}	3 October 2007 ^{(D)}	—N/a	Later releases were re-authored with "menus that aren't totally incomprehensible" and the option to play challenges individually. A preview disc, "Best of the Challenges", was given away with Top Gear Magazine the previous month.
The Challenges 2	2 June 2008 ^{(D)}	6 November 2008 ^{(D)}	—N/a	Later releases were re-authored with "menus that aren't incomprehensible" and the option to play challenges individually. Bonus: out-takes, multi-angle driving sequences, extended 'Star In A reasonably Priced Car' laps/interviews with Lewis Hamilton and Simon Cowell. Amazon-exclusive limited edition release came packaged in a cardboard sleeve, with a free "I Am the Stig" XL T-shirt.
The Challenges 3	8 June 2009 ^{(D)}	5 November 2009 ^{(D)}	—N/a	Bonus: "The Cool Wall Uncut", "Extended 'Star In A Reasonably Priced Car' interview/lap with Boris Johnson", "Extended Top Gear Awards", "Spitfire Magic" and "Rides With The Stig".
The Challenges 4	7 June 2010 ^{(D)}	4 November 2010 ^{(D)}	—N/a	
The Challenges 5	13 June 2011 ^{(D)}	3 November 2011 ^{(D)}	—N/a	Bonus: Extended interview with Lewis Hamilton, Deleted Scenes and Outtakes.
The Challenges 6	4 June 2012 ^{(D)}	2 August 2012 ^{(D)}	—N/a	Bonus: Stig’s Cousins’ Laps, Unseen Interview Clips of Sebastian Vettel, Jonathan Ross, Ryan Reynolds, Ross Noble and Alice Cooper, Interceptors’ Titles Sequence, Amy Williams’ Helmet Cam Footage, Desert & Ice Montage, Deleted Scenes
Best of British	4 August 2014 ^{(D)}	—N/a	—N/a	
Greatest Hits	23 November 2015 ^{(D,B)}	3 August 2016 ^{(D,B)}	—N/a	
Best of the Specials	27 November 2017 ^{(D)}	14 February 2018 ^{(D)}	—N/a	Was reissued in Australia on 8 April 2020, following change of BBC distributor.
Winter Blunderland	26 November 2018 ^{(D)}	—N/a	—N/a	
Planes, Trains & Automobiles	25 November 2019 ^{(D)}	12 August 2020 ^{(D)}	—N/a	
Motors, Mischief & Mayhem	23 November 2020 ^{(D)}	—N/a	—N/a	Was later given away with Tesco copies of the November 2021 issue of Top Gear Magazine.
Cars, Crashes and Chaos	28 November 2022 ^{(D)}	—N/a	—N/a	
Direct To Video
Richard Hammond's Uncovered: The DVD Special	16 November 2009 ^{(D)}	—N/a	—N/a	Richard Hammond advises the viewer on how to create and present their own episode of Top Gear, using household objects and relatives' cars.
Apocalypse	22 November 2010 ^{(D,B)}	—N/a	—N/a	Richard Hammond and James May investigate post-apocalyptic motoring by attempting a number of challenges to discover how those in a post apocalyptic world would cope.
At the Movies	14 November 2011 ^{(D,B)}	—N/a	—N/a	Richard Hammond and James May search for the best movie scenes connected with cars and re-enact them in their own special way.
The Worst Car in the History of the World	19 November 2012 ^{(D,B)}	—N/a	—N/a	Jeremy Clarkson and James May travel to the North of England to name and shame some of the worst cars in history, from manufacturers who "should have known better".
The Perfect Road Trip	18 November 2013 ^{(D,B)}	—N/a	—N/a	Jeremy Clarkson and Richard Hammond select the best mode of transport for each part of a journey from Venice in Italy to Pau in France.
The Perfect Road Trip 2	17 November 2014 ^{(D,B)}	—N/a	—N/a	Jeremy Clarkson and Richard Hammond have "another crack" at experiencing the Perfect Road Trip in a range of cars on roads amongst the scenery and sunshine of the Mediterranean.
Other
Richard Hammond's Interactive Challenge	21 November 2007 ^{(D)}	2 January 2008 ^{(D)}	—N/a	Interactive DVD, featuring challenges, quizzes and other games from the world of Top Gear.
Richard Hammond's Stunt Challenge	17 November 2008 ^{(D)}	2 January 2009 ^{(D)}	—N/a	Interactive DVD: further challenges, quizzes and competitions
Ambitious But Rubbish	—N/a	2 December 2015 ^{(D)}	—N/a	Contains all eight episodes of the BBC America series
From A – Z: The Ultimate Extended Edition	2 December 2015 ^{(D,B)}	—N/a	—N/a	143 minute "Extended Edition"
