= Toyota i-REAL =

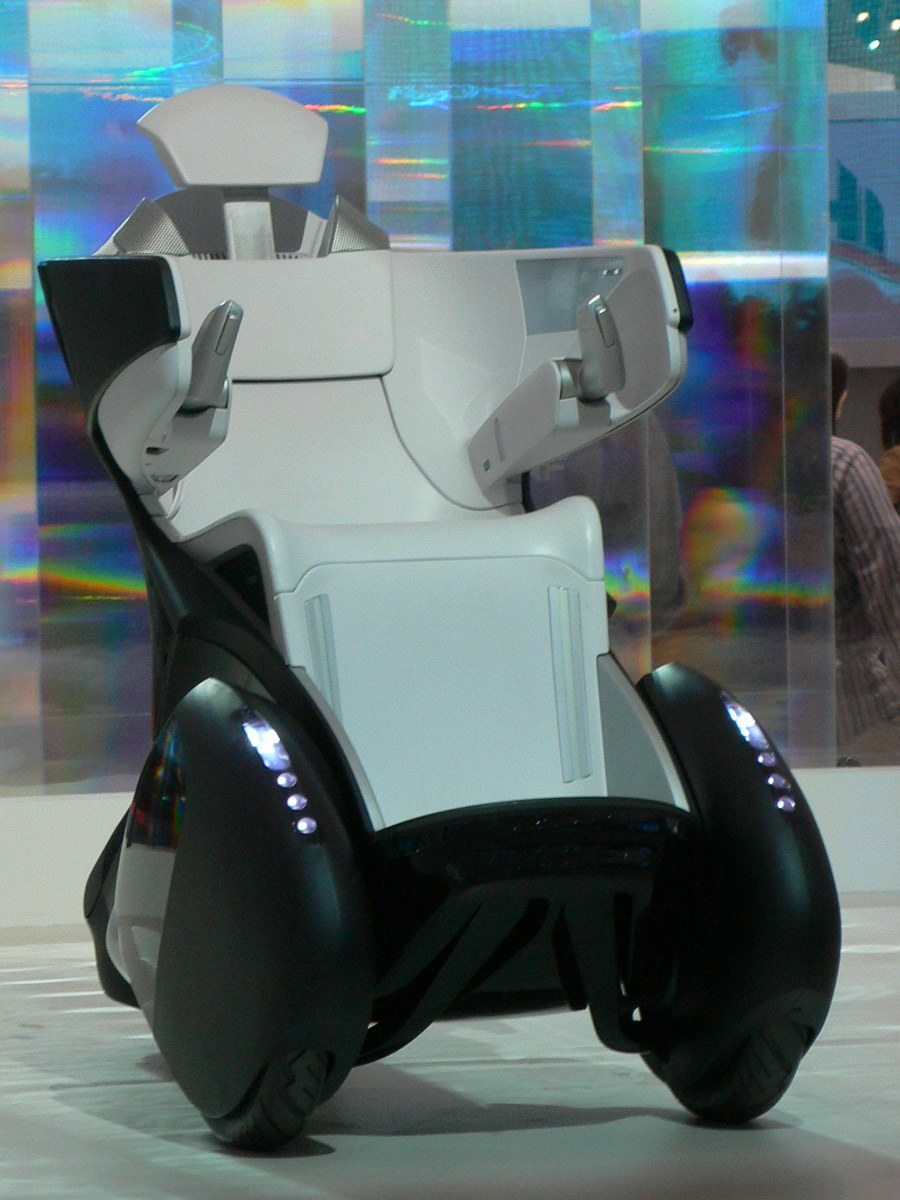

Overview
- Manufacturer: Toyota
- Production: Concept

Body and chassis
- Class: Personal Mobility Vehicle
- Body style: Electric Mobile Chair
- Layout: Three-wheel drive
- Related: i-unit

Powertrain
- Engine: lithium-ion batteries
- Transmission: none

Dimensions
- Length: 995 mm (39.2 in)
- Width: 700 mm (27.6 in)
- Height: 1,430 mm (56.3 in)

Chronology
- Predecessor: Toyota i-unit

The i-REAL is a 'Personal Mobility Concept' made by automotive giant Toyota that was planned to be put on sale sometime around 2010. It is a development of previous Toyota Personal Mobility vehicles including the i-unit and Toyota i-swing. As with said previous vehicles, the i-REAL is a 3-wheeled electrically powered one-passenger vehicle, running on lithium-ion batteries.

In Low-Speed Mode, the vehicle is upright, and moves around at 'walking pace' at similar eyesight height to pedestrians, without taking up a large amount of space. In High-Speed Mode, the Toyota extends in length by leaning back and extending the single rear wheel to improve aerodynamics and stability, thus being able to achieve a speed of 18.6 mph, or 30 km/h. It leans into corners, like other tall, one-man vehicles such as the Segway, to prevent it from tipping over.

There are two joysticks, one for each hand. Either joystick controls the i-Real, so left- and right-handed people will be equally at home. You push the joystick forwards to go forwards, left to go left, right to go right and pull back to stop. Perimeter-monitoring sensors detect when a collision with a person or object is imminent and alerts the driver by emitting a noise and vibrating. At the same time, it alerts people around it of its movements through use of light and sound.

The i-REAL was driven on the BBC's motoring programme Top Gear in 2008 by Richard Hammond. (Series 12)
