= IUnits =

Iunits may refer to:

- Toyota i-units, single seater four wheeled Toyota concept cars
- IShares (exchange-traded fund) brand name formerly known as iUnits in Canada
