= Top Gear Race to the North =

Race held in 2009

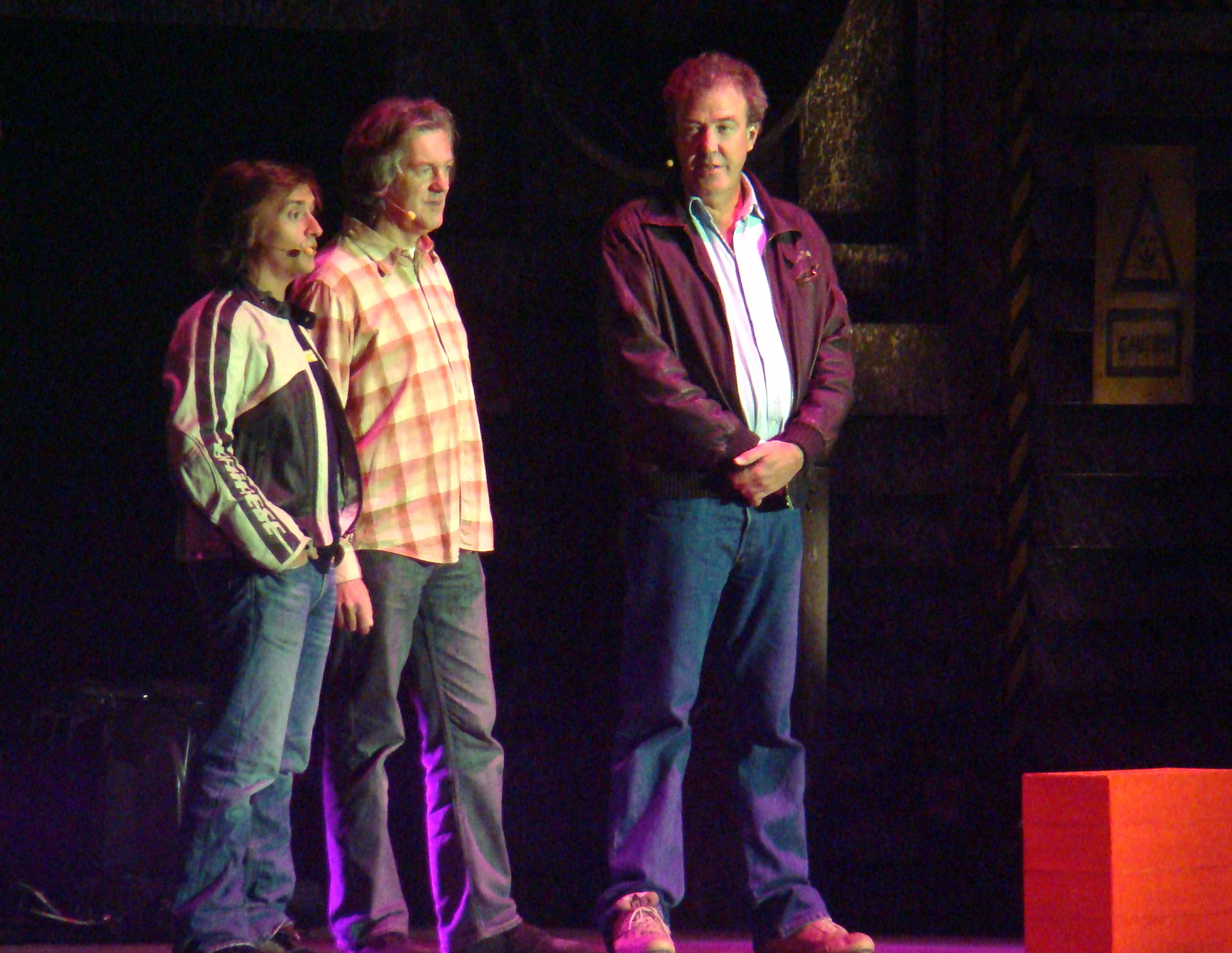
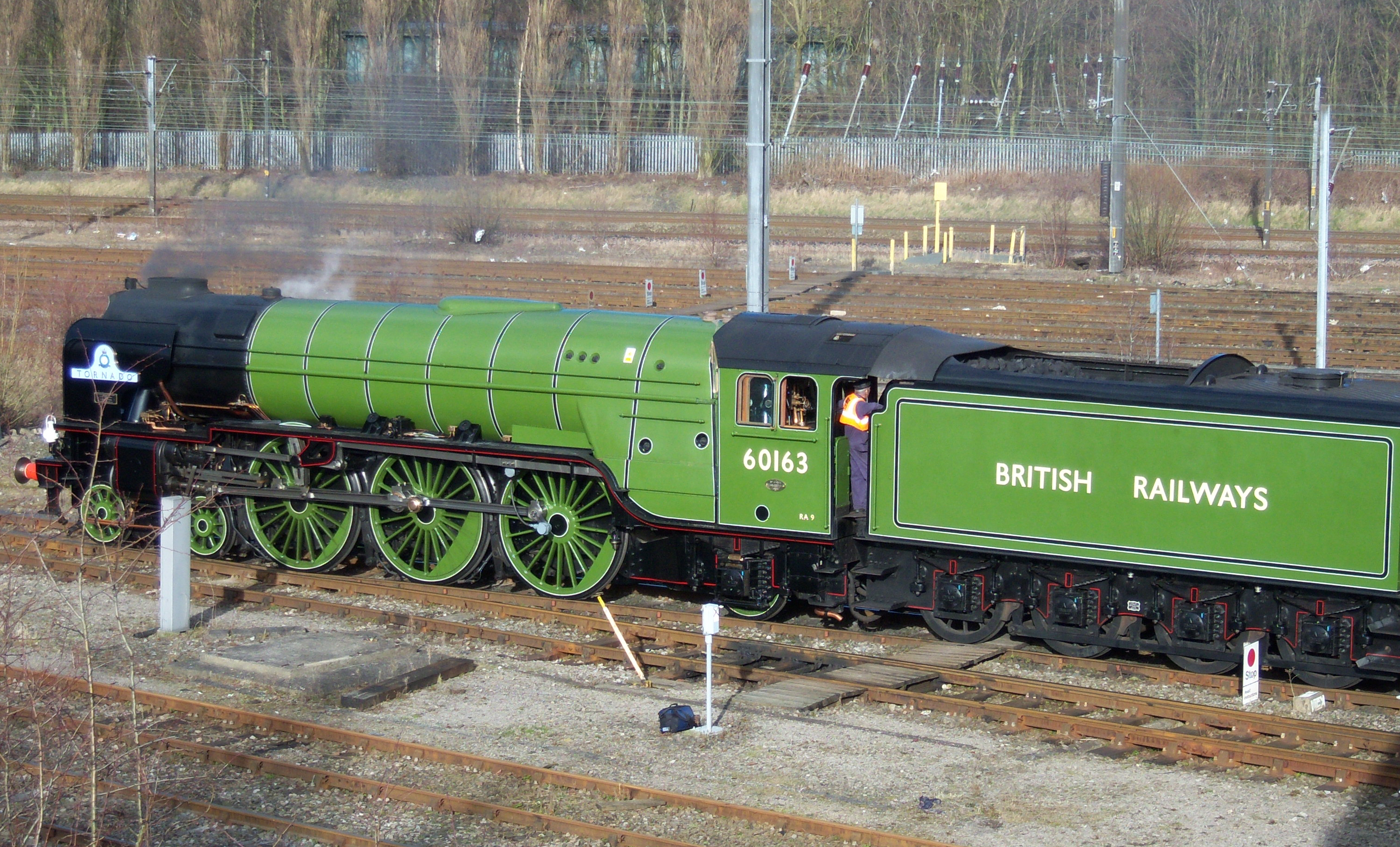
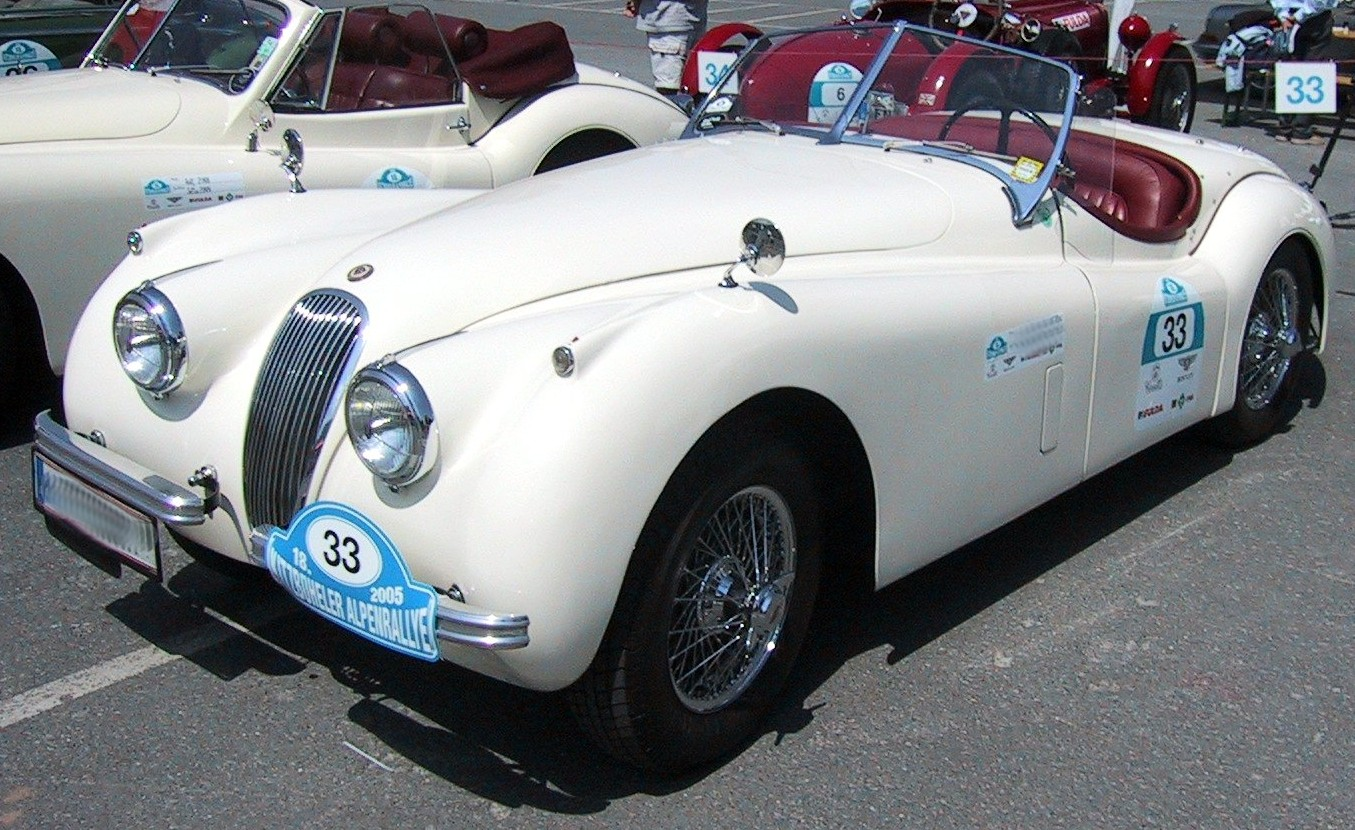
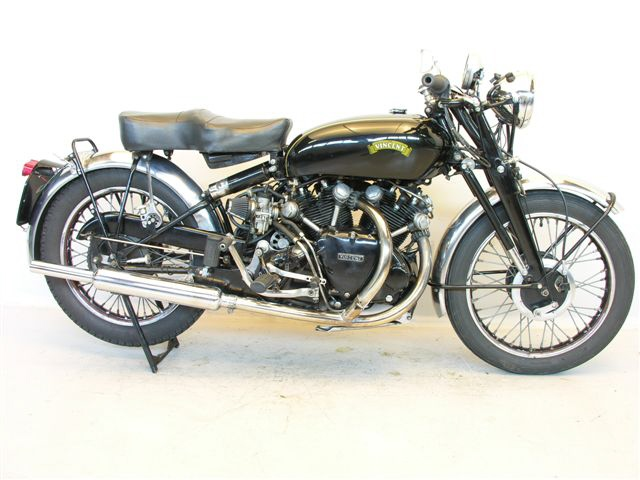
Clockwise from top left: Hammond, May and Clarkson; No. 60163 Tornado; Vincent Black Shadow; Jaguar XK120

The Race to the North is an episode of Top Gear that featured a three-way race held in 2009 between a Jaguar XK120 car, a Vincent Black Shadow motorcycle, and railway locomotive 60163 Tornado – a brand new mainline steam engine completed in Britain in 2008. The race saw the car, bike and locomotive, race from London, England, to Edinburgh, Scotland, a journey of around 400 miles (640 km). Eighteen months in the planning, the race was filmed in secret on 25 April 2009, and shown on 21 June 2009 as the first episode of the thirteenth series of Top Gear.

Dubbed A1 versus A1, the race involved Tornado, based on the design of the 1949 Peppercorn A1 Class British Railways express passenger locomotives running on the East Coast Main Line, pitted against the 1949 models of Jaguar car and Vincent motorbike, both being restricted to using the A1 primary road, rather than the modern day M1 motorway (because the M1 was not opened until 1959).

To decide on who would use which form of transportation for the race the trio would pick out pieces of paper from a hat. Richard Hammond picked first and would ride the Black Shadow motorbike. Jeremy Clarkson picked next, and to the surprise of everyone, especially James May, would travel on board the footplate of Tornado, leaving the Jaguar to May.

However, while being introduced to the footplate crew alongside Tornado's representative Graham Bunker, who would be traveling on the footplate of Tornado on the first leg to York and parts of the second leg from Berwick, Clarkson was told to his horror that he would not be driving but would instead be the fireman, in charge of shovelling the coal for the trip – "I'd be shovelling a lot of coal, 8 tons of it". The race was to be the centrepiece of the first episode in the 13th series of Top Gear.

No. 60163 Tornado, capable of 100 miles per hour (160 km/h) but at the time restricted to 75 miles per hour (120 km/h), broke a number of records for preserved steam locomotive operation in Britain, including the first 'non-stop' all-steam-hauled passenger train from London King's Cross to Edinburgh Waverley in 41 years, and a first for the steam preservation era, the run having last been achieved by Tornado's fellow LNER Pacific type locomotive, No. 4472 Flying Scotsman, on 1 May 1968, a few months before mainline steam on British Railways ceased on 11 August 1968.

== Background ==
The contest was billed as the 21st Century Race to the North, as a multi-modal version of past railway races from London to Scotland. The term Race to the North had emerged in the 1890s with the various railway companies on the East Coast and West Coast main lines competing for passengers. This culminated in the 1930s competition between the London, Midland and Scottish Railway (LMS) and the London and North Eastern Railway (LNER) companies for the prestige of having the official fastest London to Scotland timetabled service, before World War II changed the priorities for the rail system.

The post-war late 1940s was an era of resurgence for the railways, driven by the newly nationalised entity British Railways, which attempted to regain some of the prestige of the pre-war competition between the private railway companies. Part of this was the creation of a non-stop passenger express train from London King's Cross to Edinburgh Waverley, timetabled at 6 hours 30 minutes. Launched in 1949 as the Capitals Limited, from 29 June 1953 it was known as The Elizabethan, after the coronation of Queen Elizabeth II on 2 June 1953. The Peppercorn A1 class was never used on the original Elizabethan due to the lack of a corridor-type tender for crew changes on the move. The original trains were exclusively operated by the streamlined LNER Class A4.

The race was specifically given a 1949 theme, with the BBC postulating that the race might represent what Top Gear would have been like in 1949. That year reflects the fact that the original 49 Peppercorn Class A1s were built in 1948–9, and accordingly, the bike and car selected were 1949 models. The motorcycle was a Vincent Black Shadow, registration 750 UXL (1952), the car was a Jaguar XK120, registration SKE 7 (1954). According to the show, the XK120 and Black Shadow were the fastest car and bike in the world in 1949. Although Tornado is a brand new locomotive completed in 2008, her design was based on the original 1940s designs used for the LNER Peppercorn Class A1 locomotives, with appropriate modern day changes for engineering, safety, operational and manufacturing cost reasons.

The idea and much of the organisation of the race is credited to Graeme Bunker, managing director of railtour operator Steam Dreams and operations director of the A1 Steam Locomotive Trust, the builders of Tornado. 18 months before the race, The BBC had an idea of doing a remake of the British Transport Film, Elizabethan Express as a drama directed by Gabriel Range who would have written the Script with producer Simon Finch.

The film would have been a rail disaster in which the train would be hijacked by a group of terrorists who plan to destroy the rail network. Meanwhile, A passenger would have been taken as a hostage in a Jaguar XK120 car, followed in pursuit by a Vincent Black Shadow motorcycle used by the terrorists. The ending of the film would have been that the train crashes on the approach to Waverley Station and after a speech from the leader. The terrorists would have caused the train to explode. The car and motorbike would have carried on for a few more miles before they and the hostage in the car got incinerated in a parking garage near Edinburgh Airport allowing the terrorists to escape.

Upon hearing this, Clarkson loved the idea so much that he decided that the drama would be axed and the run would be the first episode of the thirteenth season of Top Gear. Clarkson also contacted Graeme directly.

The Top Gear producers' initial choice of locomotive was No. 4472 Flying Scotsman, although due to her ongoing restoration at the National Railway Museum in York, Tornado was put forward as a suitable replacement. The A1 Steam Locomotive Trust saw the Top Gear race as a way to introduce more people to Tornado, following on from the publicity success of her being officially named by the Prince of Wales, and the prestigious hauling of the Royal Train, bringing the locomotive to a new audience.

Until the run made by Tornado for Top Gear, the last time a steam train had made a non-stop run from London to Edinburgh was in 1968, with a special charter run by the Locomotive Club of Great Britain (LCGB). The LCGB ran this special train on 1 May 1968, (returning on 4 May), to celebrate the 40th anniversary of the first time this journey was made non-stop. On both occasions, the train was hauled by the famous locomotive, No. 4472 Flying Scotsman.

In the preservation era, steam locomotives had only recommenced departures from King's Cross in 1994, after a 30-year gap. The departure at the time was an Elizabethan train only as far as Peterborough, hauled by No. 60009 Union of South Africa. In the following years, a goal of the preservation and railtour movement was to perform another all-steam-hauled train from London to Edinburgh. This was to have happened in 2008 as The Coronation, using two engines, one taking a London to York leg, and then another taking the train on to Edinburgh. The plan failed when, while stopped for water at Tyne Yard, an inspection of No. 60009 Union of South Africa revealed an over-heated axlebox, meaning the train was completed using diesel haulage. With the successful completion of the run by Tornado for Top Gear, she became the first steam engine to complete the run 'non-stop' for 41 years.

== Preparation ==
=== Cathedrals Express railtour ===
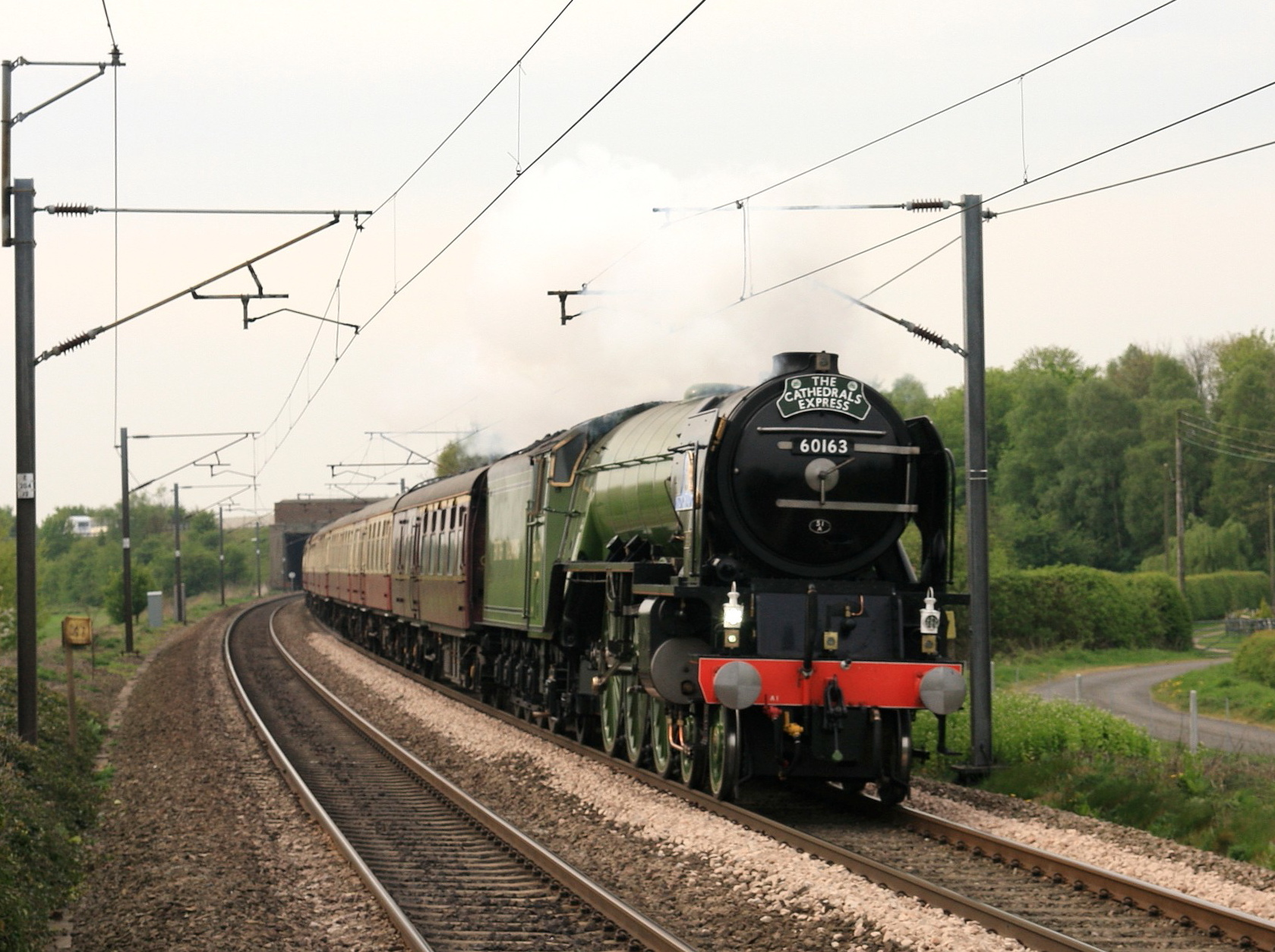
Tornado passing Sutton-on-Trent on the Race to the North, with the Cathedrals Express name

Due to the secrecy surrounding the plans to film the race, the rail part of the race was not openly publicised in advance. Instead, the rail charter was telemarketed directly to 64 regular National Express East Coast passengers, Handed out tickets to 23 members of the public and called around 600 of regular Steam Dreams customers, as one of their regular Cathedrals Express tours, and as such, carried a Cathedrals Express headboard. The tour used conventional diesel haulage for the return leg back to London, arriving at Victoria Station after an hour at Birmingham New Street, behind a Class 66 ten minutes early, another Class 66 took the empty coaches back to Eastleigh Works. The tour was only Tornado's second ever departure from King's Cross.

All passengers had been told about the tour was that it was to be an 'attempt to achieve the fastest steam hauled trip between Edinburgh and London since the 1960s'. While many rumours had persisted about this special tour, but no passengers became aware of the Top Gear plan on arrival at King's Cross.

Due to the tour being the first 'in one go' trip for a steam locomotive from London to Edinburgh for 41 years, many railway enthusiasts travelled on the train, fulfilling a lifetime's ambition of this particular 'bag' (where enthusiasts attempt to travel on, or 'bag', every possible steam tour route).

Tornado's load consisted of 11 coaches, with the A1 Trust's maroon support coach behind the locomotive followed by a kitchen car and nine dining cars of the Riviera Trains Royal Scot liveried rake in carmine and cream colours, The carriage load weighed in at 358 tons tare, 375 gross.

Given the headcode 1Z63, Tornado was booked to complete the 390.2-mile (628.0 km) journey in 8 hours 2 minutes, without any passenger stops in stations, but with four water stops en route at Grantham, York, Newcastle upon Tyne (Tyne Yard) and Berwick, totalling 95 minutes booked stoppage time. The crew changed over at York; and at the water stop at Tyne Yard Tornado also took on more coal.

No public trains were rescheduled to create a special path for the charter train, however, the schedule planned in advance was crafted to avoid where possible being delayed by public trains. Also, in a departure from normal main line steam operation railway practice, the train was, where necessary, given priority over normal train services. This was achieved by having a National Express East Coast executive on board, communicating by mobile phone and radio with signal boxes and train control centres.

Passengers dined from a menu which was put together by Jamie Oliver.

=== Race conditions ===
The race was started on platform 1 of London King's Cross station, and the finishing line was the bar at the Balmoral Hotel, adjacent to Edinburgh Waverley station.

The race was also billed as A1 versus A1, the LNER Peppercorn Class A1 design Tornado against the car and bike allowed to use only the A1 road, otherwise known as the historic Great North Road, which runs from London to Edinburgh and is the longest single-numbered road in the United Kingdom.

The rail route taken by Tornado on the East Coast Main Line is 390.2 miles (628.0 km) long. The A1 road by comparison is 413 miles (665 km) long, albeit from St Paul's Cathedral and not King's Cross, to the centre of Edinburgh, at the eastern end of Princes Street near Waverley station.

The race was to be run "as quick as legally possible", with the road vehicles restricted to the UK speed limit of 70 miles per hour (110 km/h), and Tornado restricted to its approved 75 miles per hour (121 km/h) main line top speed, where the line was not otherwise restricted by temporary or permanent speed restrictions.

== Race ==
=== Start ===
At 7 am Platform 1 at London King's Cross was cordoned off, as the camera crew filmed the three presenters drawing lots to determine which mode of transport to take. Clarkson was allocated Tornado, May got the Jaguar while Hammond got the bike. Tornado was scheduled to depart at 7:25 am. The race officially started with a blast on Tornado's whistle. May and Hammond proceeded to the car and bike which were parked in York Way. Tornado left approximately 90–120 seconds late due to delays in the camera crew boarding the support coach. As seen on the programme, Hammond was delayed as he changed into his biker's leathers and was delayed again as he struggled to start the Black Shadow. The Vincent was eventually started by a technician employed to provide technical support for the shoot.

=== Tornado on the main line ===
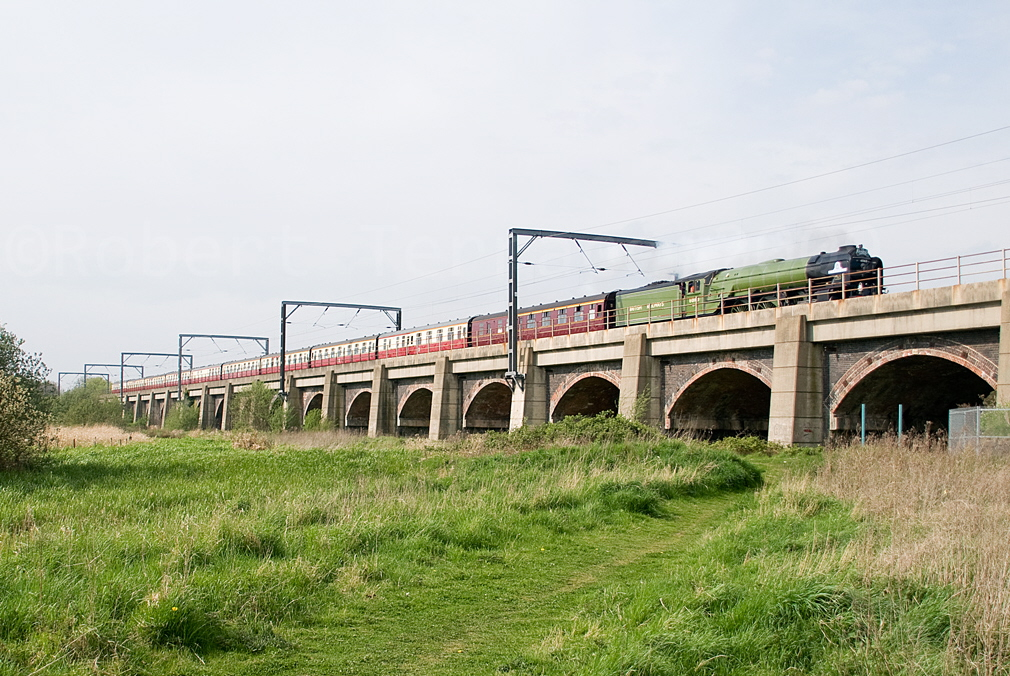
Tornado at speed on the Race to the North on 25 April 2009, crossing the viaduct at Bawtry, South Yorkshire

Due to the special arrangements made with National Express East Coast, and the modern features of Tornado's design, the run by Tornado set a number of steam preservation records, having been able to maintain 75 miles per hour (121 km/h) for long distances during the race. The 5 minute 57 second time to travel from King's Cross to Finsbury Park was a speed record for preservation and comparable to 1950s non-stop trains. Due to her increased tender capacity, the initial run from King's Cross to Grantham was believed to be the longest preservation era non-stop run. Tornado was also recorded as taking just 27 seconds longer to reach Potters Bar than LNER A4 class No. 60011 Empire of India hauling The Coronation, which was hauling 50 tons less on the day.

Due to a continuous gaining of time in the first leg, by arrival at Grantham, Tornado was 6 minutes ahead of schedule. Part of the reason for the quick running revealed on the programme was the need to repair a steam leak. This could not be addressed until the Grantham stop, so the speed was increased to allow for a longer stop. On leaving Grantham, due to a late-running National Express East Coast Leeds service, and a temporary track speed restriction, by Claypole, Tornado was 7 minutes behind schedule. Tornado was slowed down for a section near Doncaster after drivers had reported an "exciting ride" while Tornado was hauling the Yorkshire Pullman on 18 April the week before.

By Colton Junction, Tornado had reduced the lag to 2 minutes, but due to a series of signals at the yellow warning aspect, on arrival at the York water stop, Tornado was again 5 minutes behind schedule. A quick stop meant that she left York on time, having been serviced by a road tanker. The time taken from London to reach Peterborough, Grantham and York were all preservation era records. Back on schedule and nearing the finish line, Tornado was forced to slow down for a First ScotRail North Berwick Line service. Also, as revealed on the programme, during the latter part of the race approaching the Berwick stop, Tornado's speed had to be temporarily reduced to 50 miles per hour (80 km/h) due to one of the steam injectors (which is a device which uses the boiler's own steam to transfer water from the tender into the boiler, over-coming the high pressure within the boiler) failing to operate for 10 minutes, risking the boiler running dry which would have necessitated dropping the fire to prevent major damage.

With her arrival at Waverley after exactly 8 hours, Tornado's actual running time when subtracting the 96 minutes taken for water stops, was just inside that of the original Elizabethan runs of 6 hours 30 minutes.

=== Progress on the A1 road ===
The Jaguar made the early running over the bike on the A1 road due to Hammond's failure to start the bike alongside changing into his bikers leathers, although Tornado was in the overall lead from the start. The car and bike interchanged places while making their respective re-fuelling stops at filling stations.

May was hampered by the Jaguar's limited fuel range and an unreliable petrol gauge which caused him to make frequent filling station stops out of fear of running out of fuel. Hammond had attempted to prolong his fuel stops to the very last possible moment by employing the Vincent's reserve fuel tank. This plan however would backfire after his fuel stop 30 miles (48 km) south of Doncaster. When 20 miles (32 km) south of Doncaster Hammond was forced to pull over in the rain after breaking down. Having failed to close the reserve tank tap, sludge from the fuel tank had entered the fuel lines and blocked the left hand carburettor. The amount of time that would be required to repair the bike alongside the gap that was being opened up between him and the car which was still in second place at the time meant it was now impossible to win the race. It was now between Clarkson, on the footplate of Tornado, and May, in the driver's seat of the Jaguar.

The Jaguar finally took the overall lead from Tornado as it was stationary in Tyne Yard taking on coal and water. Having repaired the carburettor, Hammond resumed the race but was now way behind, near Leeds by the time Clarkson and May were approaching Newcastle. As Tornado departed Tweedmouth sidings following her final water stop, May had a small lead, being about 10 miles (16 km) north of Berwick.

=== Finish ===
Tornado arrived 1 minute ahead of schedule at Waverley at 3:26 pm, having taken a total of 8 hours exactly. On arrival Clarkson and crew ran the short distance to the Balmoral Hotel. However, he arrived to find that May was already there, waiting for him with a pint. In a fit of exhaustion from traveling on the footplate for over 8 hours alongside the continuous firing work and running to the finish line Clarkson collapsed in a heap on the floor requiring James to revive him with a beer. This being followed by him saying "I never wanna see another steam train". May said in his Daily Telegraph column after the race was broadcast that he had arrived "no more than 10 minutes" before the train.

The winner of the race was kept under wraps by the BBC. It was reported prior to the programme however that Hammond had not won, but had in fact come last, with his bike having broken down somewhere en route.

While Clarkson and May awaited Hammond, enjoying a beer in the hotel, they were spotted by a wedding party arriving, after the couple had been married at a nearby church. Despite Clarkson's filthy attire, both were invited to pose for wedding photos with the bride in her traditional white wedding dress and the groom in a kilt, on the steps of the hotel, with a number of onlookers gathering for the scene, the pictures of which made national headlines. The bride had initially thought Clarkson was a traditional lucky chimney sweep. Clarkson was covered in an unusually heavy amount of soot due to the fact that, in addition to being exposed as normal during his stint as fireman shovelling coal, the presence of overhead wires and electrical equipment in the locomotive cab prevented use of damping hoses.

=== Clarkson and Tornado ===
Clarkson's decision to take the train for the race surprised many people, who expected him to take the Jaguar. Known for his loathing of trains and public transport, the BBC described his decision to choose Tornado as an "almost unprecedented move".

While known as a petrolhead, Clarkson is also a big fan of British engineering, and the Tornado project was an award-winning example of this (albeit incorporating a German-designed and built fire-tube boiler). In the month following the race the A1 Trust received two engineering awards: the Sir Henry Royce Foundation Memorial Award, which honours achievement and excellence in engineering, formerly awarded to the likes of Ford, Rolls-Royce, Thrust cars and the Williams-Renault racing team; and the IMechE Engineering Heritage Award, set up in 1984 to celebrate unique excellence in Mechanical Engineering.

Clarkson was also believed to be a "secret gricer" by Steam Railway magazine, and his Doncaster birthplace was also said to be influential in his agreeing to the race in the first place, with the original LNER Peppercorn Class A1 locomotives having been designed in Doncaster, and the Class having been built in the Doncaster and Darlington locomotive works. His past interest in railways has included a review of 4472 Flying Scotsman in I Know You Got Soul, and advocacy for the railway engineer Isambard Kingdom Brunel in the television series 100 Greatest Britons.

Clarkson was on the footplate throughout the journey, acting as the fireman for periods. After the race, he was understood to have been impressed with Tornado.

=== May and Tornado ===
In a newspaper column, a few days after the race, May said the race was close and that he won the race in the Jaguar by only ten minutes.

May followed in Clarkson's footsteps, in May 2010, by also taking a footplate journey with Tornado on the mainline. In Top Gear Magazine he started a column on non- motor vehicles, one of which was about Tornado. He expressed his fondness of how steam locomotives worked and praised the work of the A1 Trust. He also included a detailed chapter on how to drive the locomotive in his book, How To Land An A330 Airbus and Other Vital Skills for the Modern Man.

May has an interest in railways. For his programme James May's Top Toys he took a footplate ride on 34016 Bodmin on the Mid Hants Railway in Hampshire and, at the climax of the programme, identified trainsets as his favourite childhood toy. In a later programme, The Great Train Race he stated that, of all his childhood toys, his model trains were closest to his heart. This programme was his second attempt to re-lay the 10 miles (16 km) of line from Barnstaple to Bideford using OO gauge Hornby Railways track and run the first train between the two towns for more than 25 years.

== Filming and broadcast ==
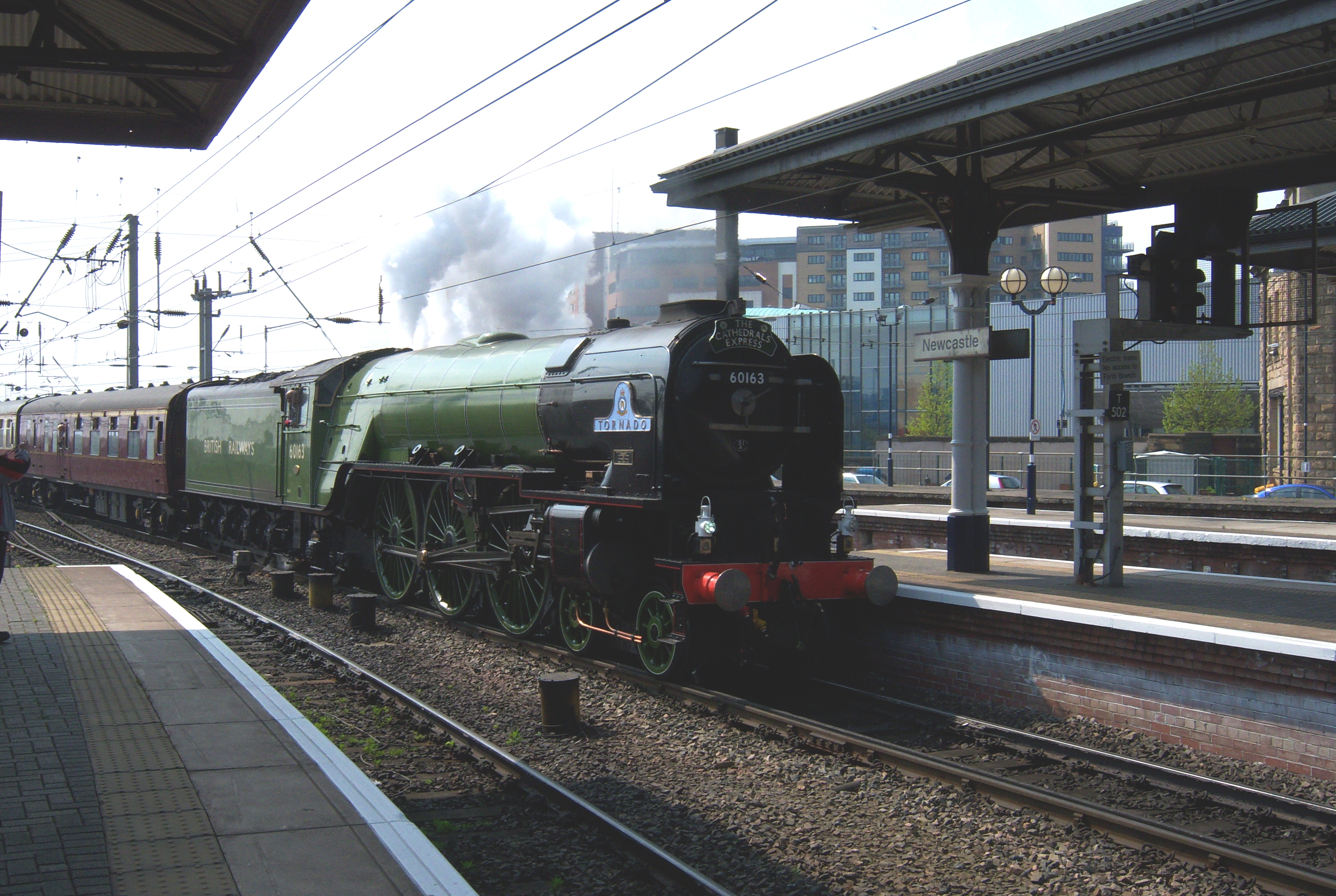
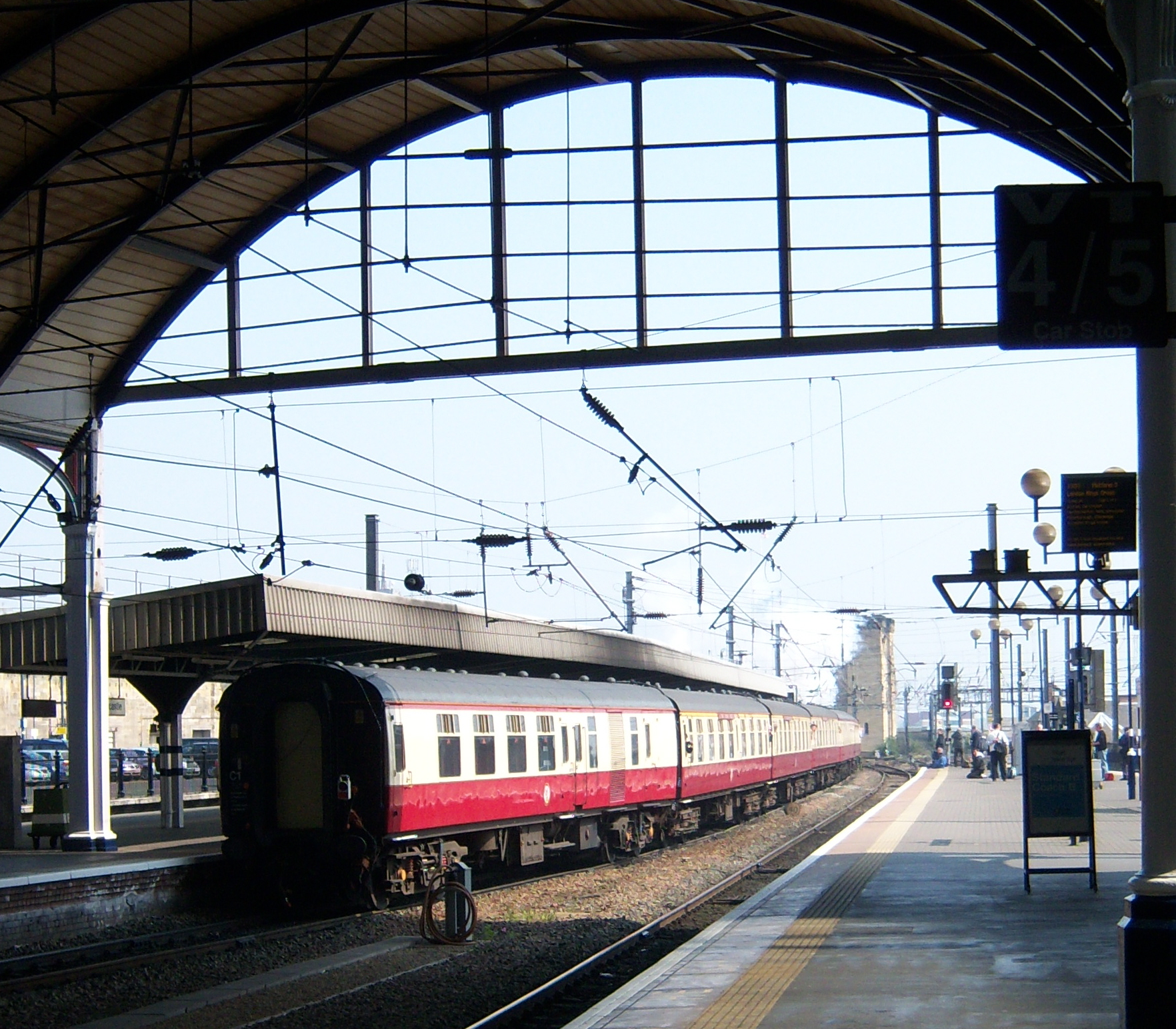
Tornado on the Race to the North, at Newcastle station entering (top image), and leaving (bottom image). The first steam train to pass through Newcastle without officially stopping, since 1968.

The Top Gear race took place on 25 April 2009. Details of the shoot were kept secret beforehand by the BBC, due to safety fears over spectators at stations, line-side and water stops or paparazzi photographers attempting to follow the car or bike on the A1.

Non-stop London to Edinburgh train runs had previously featured in the Elizabethan Express filmed in the summer of 1953, hauled by the LNER Class A4 No. 60017 Silver Fox, and the BBC's own film of the 1968 anniversary run. For the 2009 film Tornado was fitted with multiple miniature cameras around the locomotive and inside the cab, and using one front-mounted camera attached to the red buffer beam, raising the possibility of any footage gained being used to produce a modern-day version of the famous 1952 BTF film London to Brighton in Four Minutes, a four-minute long speeded up view of the railway route from London to Brighton as viewed from the front of the Brighton Belle.

Much of Tornado's journey was also filmed from one of Flying TV's helicopters, registered G-PIXX, piloted by Capt. Kim Campion and filmed by cameraman Matt Wyer. Flying TV was owned and managed by the late DJ Mike Smith.

The race was to be the main feature of the first episode of the 13th series of Top Gear, broadcast in the 8pm slot on BBC Two on Sunday 21 June 2009. According to the BBC, the race was to be one of Top Gear's "most incredible and most epic races to date". The event made national media attention after May and a soot blackened Clarkson were photographed outside the Balmoral Hotel, waiting for Hammond to arrive.

Following the date of filming the race in April, Tornado continued its national tour, with further main line charters, as well as visits to the North Yorkshire Moors Railway and West Somerset Railway heritage railways, before the broadcast date of the Top Gear race.

On the date the race was to be broadcast in June, on Sunday 21 June (Father's Day), Tornado was due to undertake two tours in the south of England. These would be a daytime circular tour out of London Waterloo through Basingstoke and down to Havant on the south coast in Hampshire, before returning through Guildford back to Waterloo. In the evening, Tornado would haul another circular tour, this time out of London Victoria around Kent, tackling Martin Mill bank and passing the White Cliffs of Dover.

After the episode was shown, BBC Two would Broadcast a documentary titled James May on the Moon in which May Celebrates the 40th anniversary of Apollo 11.

== Authenticity ==
For various reasons, it was not possible to run a historically accurate recreation of how the race would have gone in 1949. Instead, according to Graeme Bunker, the race was "done just for fun and entertainment". A major restriction was Tornado's maximum speed limit of 75 miles per hour (121 km/h), set as a condition of its current main line certification (although the A1 Trust was planning to have Tornado certified to a higher speed over time). The 'Flyers' of the 1950s would have gone on to speeds of 90 miles per hour (140 km/h) and beyond. A further difficulty was due to water troughs having been removed from the rail network, meaning it was not possible to achieve the postwar steam timings of six and a half hours. According to Steam Railway magazine, if Tornado had been able to use troughs, the train would have won the race easily. On the plus side for the car and bike, they had the speed advantage of not having to travel through towns and villages exactly as the old Great North Road would have, but instead benefitted from the use of modern bypasses, and the faster A1(M) sections of the A1, where it has been upgraded to motorway standards. However, speed restrictions outside built-up areas were only introduced in Britain in 1965, so in 1949, neither the car nor motorbike would have been subject to any speed restrictions for most of the journey.

== Funding ==
The rail portion of the race was achieved with no financial cost to the licence payer, due to fare-paying passengers being on the tour, and through savings achieved by the railway companies providing their services at cost. The helicopter was provided by the BBC. More than 100 passengers were on the train, paying a minimum fare of £250 a head with dining service throughout.

Steam Dreams (railtour promoter), Riviera Trains (rolling stock provider), Network Rail (network access), DB Schenker (depots and drivers), National Express East Coast (ticketing, control) all contributed their services to the train at cost price, with all profits remaining going to the A1 Steam Locomotive Trust to pay off the remaining debts from building Tornado.

The Railway Touring Company also contributed by cancelling a rail tour to Newcastle, freeing up the departure slot from King's Cross for Tornado.

== May 2009 Coronation railtour ==
On 16 May 2009 Tornado participated in a second completion of the London to Edinburgh run, this time a publicly available train. This run produced the first 'up' direction (Edinburgh to London) version of the steam journey. Originally this was planned as a multi-locomotive tour, with Tornado hauling a leg along with all three operational LNER Class A4s: No. 60007 LNER Sir Nigel Gresley, No. 60019 Bittern and No. 60009 Union of South Africa. However, 60019 became unavailable, and Tornado was called on to replace her for the King's Cross to York leg on 16 May, as well as her original leg of bringing the tour back into London on 18 May 2009, with an intermediate tour in Scotland occurring on 17 May 2009.

== See also ==
- Top Gear races
