= Top Gear series 12 =

Top Gear
- Series 12
- Promotional poster
- Starring: Jeremy Clarkson; Richard Hammond; James May; The Stig
- No. of episodes: 8

Release
- Original network: BBC Two
- Original release: 2 November – 28 December 2008

Series chronology
- ← Previous; Series 11 Next → Series 13

Series 12 of Top Gear, a British motoring magazine and factual television programme, was broadcast in the United Kingdom on BBC Two during 2008, consisting of seven episodes that were aired between 2 November and 14 December. This series' highlights included the presenters tackling the task of driving lorries, investigating car-tuning, a fuel-economy race, the first power test by James May, and a review of cars made during the Cold War era. After the series concluded, a feature-length special for Christmas, titled Top Gear: Vietnam Special, was aired on 28 December 2008, focusing on the presenters travelling across Vietnam with motorcycles.

A series of compilation episodes featuring the best moments of the eleventh and twelfth series, titled "Best of Top Gear", were aired during 2009, between 1 January and 1 February. The twelfth series faced two sets of criticism, one for a joke referencing a major crime in 2006, and the other questioning the review of a car by Jeremy Clarkson in regards to his comments on its quality.

== Episodes ==
No. overall	No. in series	Reviews	Features/challenges	Guest(s)	Original release date	UK viewers (millions)
98	1	Porsche 911 GT2 • Lamborghini Gallardo LP560-4	£5,000 Lorry challenge (ERF EC11 • Renault Magnum • Scania P94D)	Michael Parkinson	2 November 2008	7.74
Clarkson, Hammond and May see how easy it is to be an HGV driver, by each buying a second-hand lorry cab within a budget of £5,000 – May buys a Scania 94D, Clarkson buys a Renault Magnum and Hammond gets an ERF EC11. Heading for the "Top Gear's Secret Alpine Test Location" (in Bedfordshire), the trio undertake a series of challenges, including power-sliding their lorries, tackling the Alpine course while transporting a trailer with a valuable piece of (unsecured) cargo, seeing how fast their lorry is and attempting a hill start without breaking something precious to them. For their final challenge, they return to the test track, where they find how quickly they can brake after ploughing into an "obstacle" at high speed. Elsewhere, Clarkson is testing out the Porsche 997 GT2 and Lamborghini Gallardo LP560-4 on the track, and chat show legend Michael Parkinson is in "t'reasonably priced car".
99	2	Abarth 500 Esseesse	Muscle Car Challenge: (Dodge Challenger SRT8 • Chevrolet Corvette ZR1 • Cadillac CTS-V)	Will Young	9 November 2008	7.57
The team head out on a road trip from San Francisco to the Bonneville Salt Flats in Utah, to test drive the new generation of American muscle cars – Hammond drives the new Dodge Challenger, Clarkson is in the new Chevrolet Corvette C6 ZR1, and May wishes he wasn't with the Cadillac CTS-V. Thanks to the U.S. State department, the trio only have visas that allow them to be factual rather than entertaining, and so must be careful not to show anything too funny or exciting, as Hammond and Clarkson race between the lights at Reno and head onto some twisty back roads to see if they can get May to like his car. Once at the Salt Flats, the trio attempt to see if they achieve a respective high speed for the cars on a one mile straight drive with an unfavourable driving surface. Elsewhere, Clarkson tests out how good a small family car the Abarth 500 Esseesse is, and the original winner of Pop Idol, Will Young, talks about his own Top Gear race as he does a lap in the Lacetti. Note: Hammond was forced to buy a Dodge Challenger for the American Muscle Car Challenge after Dodge/Chrysler refused to lend one to Top Gear for filming due to unhappiness over previous criticism of their cars during prior episodes of programme.
100	3	Toyota i-REAL	Tuning challenge: Renault Avantime • Finnish folk racing • Corvette V-8 engine blender-made smoothie	Mark Wahlberg • Mika Häkkinen • John Moore	16 November 2008	6.98
The boys attempt to see if they can modify a Renault Avantime with the remainder of a £15,000 budget provided for them, so that it can lap the test track as fast as a Mitsubishi Lancer Evolution X, and quickly discover that it's not as easy a task as it seems. Meanwhile, Hammond heads to Toyota City in Japan to test out a "drivable" chair, the i-REAL, May prepares for his first supercar review by learning "The Finnish Way of Car Control" from Mika Häkkinen and entering a Jokamiesluokka (a rallycross race), Clarkson sees if he can make a food blender out of a V8 engine by making a 'manly' drink, and Mark Wahlberg tries to adjust to a manual gearbox and the right-handed seating position of the reasonably priced car.
101	4	Pagani Zonda Roadster F • Bugatti Veyron	Economy race from Basel to Blackpool Illuminations (Volkswagen Polo BlueMotion • Jaguar XJ Diesel • Subaru Legacy Diesel)	Harry Enfield	23 November 2008	7.15
The trio are on a fuel economy race to see who can make it from Basel in Switzerland to Blackpool in northwest England, on a single tank of fuel – May is sensible and selects a Subaru Legacy Diesel, Clarkson thinks its pointless and arrives in a Jaguar XJ Diesel, and Hammond turns up in a Volkswagen Polo BlueMotion to the scorn of his compatriots, with all three allowed to choose their own routes to the finish line. While Clarkson is interested in just running out near his home, Hammond and May show their competitive sides in this clever race, but once back in Britain, all three soon begin praying they can achieve what they set out to do, with a surprise in store for one of them. Meanwhile, May tackles his first ever power test by seeing how good the Pagani Zonda F Roadster is, the Stig finally gets to step into the Bugatti Veyron and do a power lap around the track to see how fast it is, and Harry Enfield returns to redeem his honour by hoping he did better this time in the Lacetti.
102	5	Lexus IS F • BMW M3	Portofino to Saint-Tropez Race: Powerboat vs. Ferrari Daytona • Best bus for British city streets (Leyland Olympian, Dennis Dart, Mercedes O305G, Leyland-DAB, Optare MetroRider)	Kevin McCloud • Tom Chilton	30 November 2008	7.51
The Lexus IS-F is in Clarkson's hands as he sees if it can unseat the king of high-powered saloons, the four door BMW M3, while Hammond sees if motorsport and a handful of touring car legends can find the best type of bus for London's street at Lydden Hill Race Circuit – contenders include a double decker, a single decker, two bendy buses, and a compact hopper bus. Meanwhile, there's a race on the Riviera, as Hammond races a Ferrari Daytona from Portofino to Saint-Tropez against May in a £1.25 million power boat, and Kevin McCloud makes an appearance to set a time in the Lacetti.
103	6	Veritas RS III • Caterham Seven Superlight R500 • Ford Fiesta	Did the communists make a good car? • Ford Fiesta with the Royal Marines	Boris Johnson	7 December 2008	7.33
Clarkson and May can't decide if imported Chinese-made cars will be any good, which got them thinking about whether the Communists ever historically built a good car, and are soon taking a look at a range of them, including the Lada Riva, Moskvitch 408, the East German Wartburg. Elsewhere, Clarkson decides to a proper road test like in the old days in response to a complaint, and does a "serious" review of the Ford Fiesta, while Hammond is seeing if the new, German built Veritas RS III is a better track-day car than the Caterham 7 Superlight R500, and Mayor of London (at the time of broadcast), Boris Johnson, tries to drive fast in the reasonably priced car on a wet track.
104	7	Tesla Roadster • Honda FCX Clarity	50 years of British Touring Car racing • TG Stuntman takes on Fifth Gear's caravan jump record • V8 Powered Rocking Chair for the elderly • Top Gear Awards 2008	Sir Tom Jones • Jay Kay • Jay Leno	14 December 2008	7.54
Clarkson puts the first electric supercar, the battery powered Tesla Roadster (2008), through its paces on the track, while May heads to California to test drive what could be the future of motoring – the hydrogen powered Honda FCX Clarity. Elsewhere, Hammond takes a look back at 50 years of Touring Cars racing history, Top Gear Stunt Man returns to beat the record set by Fifth Gear for the furthest distance by a car off a ramp while towing a caravan, Clarkson sees if the elderly could enjoy a motorised rocking chair powered by a V8 engine, and singer, Tom Jones, is in control of the Lacetti for a lap around the track.
105	8	N/A – Vietnam Special	Vietnam Special: (Minsk • Piaggio Vespa • Honda Super Cub)	None	28 December 2008	6.70
The trio attempt to see if they can get across Vietnam within eight days, from Ho Chi Minh City (Saigon), to Hạ Long city, near Hanoi (Hà Nội), with a trio of motorcycles bought for around US$1,000. Hammond buys a Belarusian-built 125 cc two-stroke Minsk, May gets a four-stroke Honda Super Cub and an unenthusiastic Clarkson purchases a two-stroke green 1967 Piaggio Vespa, with all three learning their back-up is a 1973 Honda Chaly mini-bike as a back-up, complete with a Stars and Stripes and American music. On their journey, the trio deal with the weather and road conditions, sample the local cuisine and scenery, and engage in a motorcycle exam, before learning they must convert their bikes to cross the sea, in order to reach the finish line – a floating bar within the maze of limestone islets in Hạ Long Bay. Notes: In reference to film-maker Francis Ford Coppola, the ending credits replaced the first names of the crew with the words "Francis Ford" (e.g. "Francis Ford Clarkson", "Francis Ford Hammond", etc.). In addition, certain versions of the special including the versions found on iTunes and Amazon) replaced "Born in the U.S.A." with "The Star-Spangled Banner", which also removed certain elements whose context would not be understandable to viewers. "Born in the USA" was included when the special uploaded to BBC iPlayer in 2021.

=== Best-of episodes ===
Total	No.	Title	Feature	Original air date	UK viewers (million)
S14	CE–1	"The Best of Top Gear: 2008 No.1"	Best Moments from Series 11-12 – Part 1	1 January 2009	2.82
A look back at some of the best moments from Series 11 and 12, including a revisit of the race between the Ferrari Daytona and the Powerboat on the Riviera.
S15	CE–2	"The Best of Top Gear: 2008 No.2"	Best Moments from Series 11-12 – Part 2	4 January 2009	3.27
A second look back at some of the best moments from Series 11 and 12, including the challenge of finding a good Alfa Romeo for less than £1,000.
S16	CE–3	"The Best of Top Gear: 2008 No.3"	Best Moments from Series 11-12 – Part 3	25 January 2009	2.05
A third look back at some of the best moments from Series 11 and 12, including Clarkson's efforts to evade his pursuers in the Daihatsu Terios, and Top Gear's battle against the presenters of D-Motor.
S17	CE–4	"The Best of Top Gear: 2008 No.4"	Best Moments from Series 11-12 – Part 4	1 February 2009	2.28
A fourth look back at some of the best moments from Series 11 and 12, including a revisit of the race between the Nissan GT-R and the Bullet Train.

== Criticism and controversy ==
=== HGV challenge "prostitutes" joke ===
During the first episode of the series, Jeremy Clarkson made a joke regarding lorry drivers killing prostitutes. Following the episode's broadcast, the joke drew criticism, with many believing that it alluded to the Ipswich 2006 serial murders in which a forklift truck driver was arrested and charged with the murder of five women who had been working as prostitutes, though some believe it was more likely that Clarkson was referring to the Yorkshire Ripper. Ofcom received over 500 complaints in regards to the joke, but revealed that the remark had not been in breach of the broadcasting code. Meanwhile, Labour MP Chris Mole wrote a strongly worded letter to the BBC, stating that Clarkson should be sacked regarding the remarks he made.

=== Tesla Roadster review film ===
During the seventh episode, Top Gear reviewed and tested the battery powered Tesla Roadster (2008), in which Clarkson pointed out, upon rigorous testing, that the batteries on the Roadster drained quickly and that the car suffered mechanical problems. Tesla contested these findings following the episode, and provided data logs of the cars' performances during the show to Top Gear and the BBC, which led both to revealing in statements to the media, that the cars did not in fact break down and never went below 20 percent state of charge. Despite this, Clarkson wrote an article for The Sunday Times, following dozens of blogs and newspapers challenging Top Gear's portrayal of the Roadster's performance, in which he stood by the contents of the episode.
