= XSR48 =

The XSR 48 was a powerboat designed by companies XSMG Marine and Green Marine. The XSR 48 was built at the Berthon Shipyard in Lymington. The XSR 48 was announced in 2006, and was featured on Top Gear in a race between hosts Richard Hammond and James May, with May operating the XSR 48 from Portofino to Saint-Tropez.

The XSR 48 featured two, 11.3 liter Isotta-Fraschini twin-turbo Diesel engines with a combined output of 1,600 HP, and a top speed of 75 knots.

The boat was designed by Fabio Buzzi and Redman Whiteley Dixon, and was built out of composite Kevlar and carbon fiber hull and deck. The boat measured 14 m (48 ft) in length and 3 m (9 ft) across its beam.

The boat was built-to-order only, at a price of US$2.05 million.

XSMG went into compulsory liquidation and was dissolved on 12th May 2015. At least one completed boat was auctioned off among other items from the company by HMRC to pay of tax debts in August 2013 for £170,000, although the company continued trading. However the company was liquidated by HMRC due to further unpaid tax almost 2 years later, after which no further boats were built. It is not known how many examples were built and how many still exist.
