= Top Gear series 10 =

Top Gear
- Series 10
- Promotional poster
- Starring: Jeremy Clarkson; Richard Hammond; James May; The Stig
- No. of episodes: 10

Release
- Original network: BBC Two
- Original release: 7 October – 23 December 2007

Series chronology
- ← Previous; Series 9 Next → Series 11

Series 10 of Top Gear, a British motoring magazine and factual television programme, was broadcast in the United Kingdom on BBC Two during 2007, consisting of ten episodes that were aired between 7 October and 23 December. This series saw the props used on the programme being changed from car-based seating and a wide-screen monitor in the main set space, to wingback chairs and an old TV screen; although attributed to a fire caused by Top Gear's rival programme, it later was exposed as a publicity stunt, with the props replaced the following series. This series' highlights included the presenters crossing Botswana on a road trip, a race between a car and a fighter jet, fording amphibious cars across the English Channel, and competing in a 24-hour endurance race using home-made bio-diesel.

A series of compilation episodes featuring the best moments of the tenth series, titled "Best of Top Gear", was aired during 2008 between 1–27 January, while a special edition for Sport Relief, titled Top Ground Gear Force, involving a crossover with the former BBC programme Ground Force, was aired on 14 March 2008. The tenth series received criticism for its Botswana special in regards to environmental damage, which the BBC denied.

== Episodes ==
No. overall	No. in series	Reviews	Features/challenges	Guest(s)	Original release date	UK viewers (millions)
82	1	Volkswagen Golf GTI W12	Road trip to find the greatest driving road in the world: (Lamborghini Gallardo Superleggera • Porsche 911 GT3 RS • Aston Martin V8 Vantage N24)	Dame Helen Mirren	7 October 2007	6.27
The presenters go on a motoring holiday in Mainland Europe during the Summer, each taking a light-weight supercar with them through France, Italy, Liechtenstein and Switzerland, on their search to find the best driving road in the world. Hammond believes he will enjoy it in the Porsche 911 GT3 RS, Clarkson tries to enjoy it the fuel guzzling Lamborghini Gallardo Superleggera, and May struggles to enjoy it in a truly stripped out (and very uncomfortable) Aston Martin V8 Vantage N24. Meanwhile, Clarkson sees what the rushed construction of the Volkswagen Golf GTI W12 Concept has produced, and Dame Helen Mirren takes to the track in the Lacetti.
83	2	Audi R8 • Porsche 911 Carrera S	Amphibious Cars Challenge II: (Nissan Navara • Volkswagen T3 Transporter • Triumph Herald)	Jools Holland	14 October 2007	5.53
The presenters find themselves working with amphibious vehicles once again, this time improving on their original designs that they used at Rudyard Lake—May re-uses his original 1962 Triumph Herald sailboat, updated with a collapsible mast and a centreboard keel, Hammond creates another houseboat out of a second 1981 Volkswagen Transporter, now complete with a fibreglass hull and sealant, while Clarkson creates a new powerboat out of a 1996 Nissan Navara, and uses his mistakes from before to improve the design with two lightweight buoyancy "oildrums". However, the challenge this time is to see if they can use them to cross the English Channel from Dover to France, where they will encounter the busiest shipping lane in the world and choppy waters, amongst other issues. Elsewhere, Clarkson reviews Audi's first supercar, the Audi R8, before competing in a drag race when Hammond arrives with a Porsche 911 Carrera S, while Jools Holland sees if he can make lap time music in the Lacetti.
84	3	Ferrari 599 GTB Fiorano • Ferrari 275 GTS • Rolls-Royce Phantom Drophead Coupé	Bugatti Veyron vs Eurofighter Typhoon race • Peel P50 around the BBC office • Lexus LS600 Auto-Parking System	Ronnie Wood • Jo Wood • Fiona Bruce • Dermot Murnaghan • John Humphrys	28 October 2007	6.73
There's a host of cars on Top Gear, as Hammond tests out the auto-parking system in the Lexus LS600 before racing the Bugatti Veyron against a Eurofighter Typhoon, while May finds his favourite car of the year in the Rolls-Royce Phantom Drophead Coupé. Elsewhere, Clarkson is finding out how fast and exciting the Ferrari 599 GTB Fiorano is, before squeezing into the world's smallest car (back then), made by the Isle of Man, the Peel P50, and taking it for a drive inside BBC Television Centre, while Rolling Stones' legend, Ronnie Wood, sees if he can be fast in the reasonably priced car.
85	4	N/A – Botswana Special	Botswana Special: (Lancia Beta Coupé • Opel Kadett • Mercedes-Benz 230E)	Ian Khama	4 November 2007	6.84
The presenters take another road trip, travelling across Botswana in three second-hand cars bought for £1,500 that they hope will be better than four-wheel drive cars. May chooses a 1985 Mercedes-Benz 230E, Clarkson decides on a 1981 Lancia Beta Coupe, and Hammond buys a 1963 Opel Kadett. On their journey from Botswana's border with Zimbabwe to its northern border with Namibia, the presenters face a series of challenges, including getting across the Makgadikgadi Pan, tackling a specially made rally circuit, forging a path over the Kalahari to reach Maun, and crossing the Okavango Delta. And all while being hunted down by a Volkswagen Beetle, a car that all three hate and which is to be their back-up should any presenter's car fail to start. Note: In homage to Archbishop Desmond Tutu, the closing credits replace every credited person first name with "Archbishop Desmond".
86	5	Caparo T1 • Aston Martin V8 Vantage Roadster • Mercedes-Benz GL500	London race	Simon Cowell	11 November 2007	7.74
There's a big race across London, as the presenters see which is the quickest way to get across the city towards London City Airport—May is supporting the car with the Mercedes-Benz GL500, Hammond produces a sweat as he pedals a specialised Sirrus Limited carbon fibre bicycle, Clarkson takes to the Thames in a Cougar powerboat, and The Stig is mystified by a new world as he tries to win with public transport. Meanwhile, Hammond sees if the Aston Martin V8 Vantage Roadster can win a straight half-mile drag race against a German on roller skates with a 300 hp (220 kW) turbo powered rocket backpack, Clarkson braces himself with extra safety precautions on the track as he climbs in to the Caparo T1, and Simon Cowell returns to see how fast he is in the Lacetti.
87	6	Honda Civic Type R • Mercedes-Benz E63 AMG Estate • BMW M5 Touring • Alfa Romeo 159	Motorhome racing • Alfa Romeo 159 vs. tall man across the Humber estuary	Lawrence Dallaglio	18 November 2007	7.24
Hammond has come up with a new, wildly destructive motorsport—"motorhome racing". With a selection of motorhomes driven by himself, some touring car drivers and May, the race is on at the Essex Raceway to see which will come in a winner. Meanwhile, May is losing money with the 'Top Gear Italian Car Road Test Cliché Swear Box', as he races against Graham Boanas in an Alfa Romeo 159 to see who can get across the Humber River without using the Humber Bridge. Clarkson looks over the third Generation Honda Civic Type R and takes a look at the similarities between the BMW M5 Touring and Mercedes-Benz E63 AMG Estate. There's a look at a super-sized new German motorhome called "The Performance" with a "piece-de-resistance"—a car in its cargo space—and very luxurious interiors, and English international rugby star Lawrence Dallaglio seeks to post a fast time with the reasonably priced car.
88	7	Aston Martin DBS	£1,200 British Leyland cheap-car challenge: (Rover 3500 SE • Triumph Dolomite Sprint • Princess 2200)	Jennifer Saunders	25 November 2007	6.86
The presenters each purchase a car made by British Leyland with their own money, to celebrate its 40th anniversary, in order to prove they made a good car. Clarkson thinks it will be his Rover 3500 SE, Hammond believe his Triumph Dolomite Sprint will do it, and May tries to prove that his Princess 2200 is the best. Visiting MIRA's testing grounds and their test track, their choices face a series of challenges designed to test each car's performance, quality, speed and handling. Elsewhere, Clarkson reviews the Aston Martin DBS, and Jennifer Saunders looks to see if she can top the leaderboard when she takes a lap in the Lacetti. Jennifer Saunders' segment was completely removed from Australian editions of this episode, and from Australian DVDs, although her name remains in the credits.
89	8	Vauxhall VXR8	Renault R25 Formula One Car • Automobile history investigation • GPS satellite self-controlled BMW 330i	James Blunt • Lewis Hamilton • Anthony Hamilton	2 December 2007	8.35
Clarkson and May drive around in some very old cars, as they look back at the complex layouts they had before finding the first car that had the control layout that would be a staple in all cars right up to the present. Meanwhile, Hammond attempts to see if he can drive two laps around Stowe Circuit at Silverstone in the Renault R25 Formula One car and discovers just how tough it is, while Clarkson looks over a barn-door engineered Australian car, the Vauxhall VXR8 (a rebadged HSV Clubsport R8), and steps into a driverless BMW to supervise as he sees if it can do a lap of the track. Finally, James Blunt is the latest star in the Lacetti as he takes on a wet track, while Lewis Hamilton takes the Liana around the track.
90	9	Daihatsu Materia • Ascari A10 • Fiat 500	Britcar 24 Hour Endurance Race • Race: Fiat 500 vs. BMX riders through Budapest	Keith Allen	9 December 2007	7.38
The bio-fuel crop has been harvested, but the presenters discover they've got 500 gallons worth of bio-diesel thanks to May buying the wrong seed. To dispose of it, they decide to enter the Britcar 24-hour endurance race at Silverstone Circuit, despite not being experienced with racing, all while using a modified BMW 330d that Hammond and Clarkson worked on. With help from The Stig, the boys find out just how tough an endurance race is as they deal with mechanical problems, trouble with qualifying, tiredness, and an accident that could spell curtains on them making it to the end. Meanwhile, May is in Budapest in the new Fiat 500 to see if he can win a race with some youths on BMX bikes, while Clarkson is told not to test any more supercars for the rest of the series, so he sees how the Daihatsu Materia hatchback is by comparing it to a "close" rival—the new Ascari A10. Finally, Keith Allen faces the wettest day on record (according to the Stig) when he took to the track in the Lacetti.
91	10	Jaguar XF (X250)	German Performance Saloon cars: (Mercedes-Benz C63 AMG • BMW M3 • Audi RS4) • Top Gear Awards 2007	David Tennant	23 December 2007	7.15
Clarkson, May and Hammond are at the Stig's favourite holiday resort—the Ascari Race Resort in Ronda, Spain—with three cars to see which is the best of them. Hammond believes it's the new BMW M3, Clarkson thinks it's the powerful Mercedes-Benz C63 AMG, and May attempts to prove it's the very good Audi RS4. It's not long before they test their choices in different aspects before having a go in each other's car. Elsewhere, May tries out the new Jaguar XF designed by Ian Callum, Hammond sees if a G-Wiz would be better as a remote controlled car, the 2007 Top Gear Awards are announced, and the Tenth Doctor, David Tennant, complains about Billie Piper's lap before seeing if he is faster than her in the Lacetti.

=== Best-of episodes ===
Total	Number	Title	Feature	Original air date
S10	CE–1	"The Best of Top Gear: 2007 No.1"	Best Moments from Series 10 - Part 1	1 January 2008
A look back at some of the best moments from Series 10, including the search for the World's greatest driving road.
S11	CE–2	"The Best of Top Gear: 2007 No.2"	Best Moments from Series 10 - Part 2	6 January 2008
A second look back at some of the best moments from Series 10, including the race between the Bugatti Veyron and the Eurofighter jet.
S12	CE–3	"The Best of Top Gear: 2007 No.3"	Best Moments from Series 10 - Part 3	13 January 2008
A third look back at the best moments from Series 10, including the trio's attempt to cross to France with their improved amphibious cars, and Clarkson's drive in the Peel P50.
S13	CE–4	"The Best of Top Gear: 2007 No.4"	Best Moments from Series 10 - Part 4	27 January 2008
A fourth look back to the best moments from Series 10, including the presenters' race across London.

=== Spin-off special ===
Title	Guest	Original air date
Top Ground Gear Force	Sir Steve Redgrave	14 March 2008
In this special edition for Sport Relief, the trio take on a special challenge - to see if they can re-design Sir Steve Redgrave's garden. But like their motto says, their plan is ambitious, but ultimately rubbish, as they make a complete mess of things.

== Criticism and incident ==
=== Botswana Special: Makgadikgadi Pan crossing ===
Following the broadcast of the Botswana Special, the BBC received heavy criticism from the Environmental Investigation Agency and conservationists in regards to a section of the episode, in which the presenters were tasked with driving their used cars across the Makgadikgadi Pan in Botswana. A spokesperson from the agency criticised Top Gear being allowed to film in environmentally sensitive salt pans, with an accusation made by conservationists that they had left "scars across the Makgadikgadi salt pans by driving vehicles across them". In response to the criticism, the BBC denied that they had done this, stating that they had followed the advice of environmental experts and had not filmed anywhere near to any conservation area on the salt pans.

=== Burnt props stunt ===
During the premiere episode of the series, the presenters of Top Gear claimed that, between the filming of the ninth and tenth series, rival motoring magazine show Fifth Gear had broken into their premises and burnt down all their props. Prior to the episode being aired, a fire occurred on 12 August 2007 at Hill End Farm, destroying a barn being used as a storage facility for Top Gear props. This was evidently shown to be the case on the episode, as the Cool Wall and all the cars' photos for it had been destroyed, while the car seats the hosts used on the centre stage for the 'News' segments and for interviewing the celebrities during the 'Star in a Reasonably Priced Car' segments on the centre stage of the studio, along with the flat screen monitor, had been replaced with wingback chairs and an old TV. It was later revealed that the incident had been a publicity stunt dreamt up between Clarkson and Vicki Butler-Henderson, who were old friends.
