= Top Gear: Vietnam Special =

BBC television programme

- Presented by: Jeremy Clarkson; Richard Hammond; James May
- Country of origin: United Kingdom

Production
- Running time: TV cut 75 minutes Additional Separate DVD Deleted Scenes; 10 minutes
- Production company: Hanuman Films LocalFixersAsia

Original release
- Network: BBC Two
- Release: 28 December 2008

Related
- Top Gear

Top Gear: Vietnam Special is a special 75-minute episode for BBC motoring programme Top Gear, and was first broadcast on 28 December 2008, as part of the final episode for the twelfth series, with the special repeated for UK TV channel Dave, initially in an edited, 46 minute version on 19 January 2009, but later revised to a 90-minute format following complaints by viewers. The special sees hosts, Jeremy Clarkson, Richard Hammond and James May, travelling 1,000 miles (1,600 km) across Vietnam with motorbikes, beginning from Ho Chi Minh City (formerly Saigon), travelling north towards Hạ Long city, and finishing at a floating bar within Hạ Long Bay, a journey that had to be completed within eight days.

Unlike normal episodes of Top Gear, in which the challenges were related to the abilities of the vehicles reviewed, such as the Toyota Hilux in the Polar Special, producer Andy Wilman admitted that "the narrative of the film is a bit more skewed towards the three guys."

== Summary ==
Map of the journey (in French).

=== First leg: Saigon to Đà Lạt ===
Arriving at Saigon, the presenters were each given a shoe box containing 15 million Vietnamese đồng to buy a vehicle with for an upcoming challenge. Initially ecstatic about their seemingly very large budgets, it quickly transpired that the amount they each had was the equivalent of around $1,000 (at the time of filming), which soon led to all three discovering that both new and second-hand cars were completely out of their price range; a standard Fiat 500 that May attempted to buy was around 560,000,000₫ (£17,239.60). Clarkson reasoned that it would be impossible to get a car of any kind due to them being only recently introduced and the heavy import costs as a result, leading Hammond and May to reasonably suggest, much to his chagrin, that they should purchase motorbikes, as many of Vietnam's inhabitants relied on them greatly. Upon making their purchases, the trio met at a museum containing American military equipment used during the Vietnam War – Hammond bought a Belarusian-built 125 cc two-stroke Minsk, May opted for a four-stroke Honda Super Cub and Clarkson purchased a two-stroke green 1967 Piaggio Vespa. With bikes purchased, the trio learnt that their challenge was to journey across the country from Saigon to the Hạ Long City in the north of Vietnam within eight days, a feat that the Americans could not achieve during 10 years of war.

Prior to setting off for their first destination – the mountain town of Đà Lạt – all three needed helmets, but while Hammond had no issues wearing one that was locally-bought, both Clarkson and May were forced to get hand-made ones for the journey. While Hammond and May set off from the starting point without issues, Clarkson struggled to get his Vespa to start and had no idea how to ride a motorcycle. He was able to get help from some locals and an Australian tourist who taught him to start and ride it. Throughout the first leg, Clarkson suffered two breakdowns and needed to make repairs, including replacing the engine with a new one, while later replacing his hand-made helmet with a proper one that he procured. Hammond and May managed to stay together until they reached the mountains, where May discovered his Cub lacked power for the uphill climb and had to wheel it up to the bar they were stopping at in Đà Lạt. After Clarkson arrived, both he and May enjoyed local cuisine and vodka made with snakes, which Hammond refused to touch.

=== Second leg: Đà Lạt to Nha Trang ===
After Hammond found that his colleagues ruined his helmet and bought him a new one that was pink, the trio began making their way towards their next destination at the city of Nha Trang. Along the way, the trio encountered torrential rain, before May ran out of fuel and had to be aided by a local to refuel it, while Hammond's Minsk broke down after the clutch cable snapped and had to be repaired at a village along their route. At this point, the producers instigated a new rule that the bikes had to be repaired only with tools, after banning the trio from replacing parts on their bikes. They further added that if their bikes would not start, they would be forced to use an unappealing and rather inappropriate vehicle – a 1973 Honda Chaly mini-bike painted and flanked in a Stars and Stripes livery (similar to the bike seen in the film Easy Rider) and fitted with an iPod audio system continuously playing Bruce Springsteen's "Born in the U.S.A." (the iTunes and Netflix versions of the episode have the iPod playing "The Star-Spangled Banner"). Upon fixing Hammond's bike, the trio continued on toward Nha Trang and managed to reach it, despite difficulties in the downhill journey as night fell; Clarkson struggled the most after his headlight failed, and so was forced to strap a torch onto his bike to keep going.

=== Third leg & fourth leg: Nha Trang to Hội An; Hội An to Huế ===
Prior to starting off, Hammond was presented a gift by Clarkson in the form of a scale model of a Spanish galleon, which he had to transport on the back of his Minsk. All three set off from Nha Trang without issues, and found themselves passing through Tuy Hòa, Qui Nhơn, Quảng Ngãi, and Tam Kỳ without incident, eventually arriving in Hội An, which Clarkson described as Vietnam's version of Savile Row. Opting to purchase themselves some smart new clothes, the group managed purchase new clothes (which they compared to smoking jackets and 1960s-era mod coats) and had to stay for the day in the area while they were being made. While Clarkson took this opportunity to relax at a hotel, his colleagues went to ride their bikes at the nearby beach, where Hammond met with a local deaf-mute veteran who explained to him via sand drawings about his experience in the Vietnam War and how feelings about the war were still rife. After accidentally submerging his bike in sea water, Hammond was forced to spend the night repairing it.

Prior to setting off for Huế in their new clothing, Hammond and Clarkson visited a local marble sculptor to buy May a gift – a small but very heavy statue of a ballet dancer (later named "Darcey" by May). Once this was done, all three began making their way towards their next destination, with their route taking them via the scenic sights laid out along the Hải Vân Pass, where Clarkson began to finally enjoy his Vespa. Halfway along the pass, Clarkson soon found himself receiving a bulky painting from his colleagues to carry on his scooter. Eventually, the trio reached Huế, whereupon Hammond spent his time within the group's hotel, fixing the model ship of his, after he had damaged it since he got it at Nha Trang, unaware that his colleagues were spray painting his bike pink and even roping in local restaurant staff to help them.

=== Fifth leg & sixth leg: Huế to Hanoi (Hà Nội); Hanoi to Hạ Long ===
On their fifth day, the trio finally entered North Vietnam through Đông Hà, where they found they would be spending their morning attempting to secure driver's licences at a Vietnamese driving school. They began with a theory lesson with each presenter asked to stand up and answer a question. However, their teacher spoke to them in only Vietnamese; May made hand gestures when spoken to, while Hammond made a complete guess which was actually the correct answer, but failed because he gave it in English. Only Clarkson answered his correctly as he claimed he had learned to speak Vietnamese. Following the theory lesson, all three then had to do a practical riding test in which they had to navigate their bikes around a painted course, staying within the lines. While Hammond and May passed, Clarkson repeatedly failed, even with May's bike. Following the challenge, the trio reasoned that Top Gear itself had passed both lessons and thus passed their test.

In the afternoon, the group visited the bullet-torn Citadel of Huế, one of the major battlefields during the Tet Offensive of 1968, and spent their time exploring the site. After their visit, the trio stopped for a meal, whereupon Clarkson reasoned that they would not make their final destination in time, leading to the presenters opting to cheat by covering the remaining distance by an overnight train, a journey that would last 13 hours and would see them bypass Vinh, Thanh Hóa and Nam Định. To pass time on the journey, each presenter decided to repair each other's gift, buying material from within the train – Hammond took on the job of repairing Clarkson's painting after it got ripped; Clarkson worked on fixing May's sculpture after it lost both its arms; May worked on Hammond's model ship, effectively transforming it into a Chinese junk. Although the group manage to do their best with the gifts, upon disembarking from the train on the sixth day, they quickly found they had arrived in Hanoi (Hà Nội) and not Ha Long, and had to travel eastwards for 79.49 mi (127.93 km) in order to reach the finish. Their journey took them through more scenic landscapes, even stopping in a rural village after they got lost. During the final push to their last destination, Hammond broke down and had to be helped by May, while Clarkson went on alone and fell off his Vespa, injuring himself slightly and ruining his suit, while effectively losing enthusiasm for biking after having eventually begun to like it earlier in the journey. By dusk on the sixth day, the trio finally arrived at a wharf in Hạ Long.

=== Final leg: Hạ Long to Ba Hàng Bar ===
Despite reaching what they thought was the finish line, the trio soon received one final challenge and learned they would be setting out to search a bar called Ba Hàng, which lay within the maze of 1,969 limestone islets found in Hạ Long Bay. In order to do so, the trio discovered they would have to convert their motorbikes into water-craft, and did so during the night at a local workshop. The next morning, Clarkson and Hammond managed to set off for the Bay, while May's craft became tangled in nets, sank, and had to be towed back to shore for repairs before he could go after them. Despite mishaps with his colleagues, with Clarkson unable to start his bike due to an injury to his leg he sustained in his fall the previous day and the pair getting stuck within the mouth of a cave, all three eventually found the bar, situated within a community that lived within the islets and never went on dry land. Clarkson arrived first, followed by Hammond despite his craft being stuck going around in circles. May was the last to arrive, though he was forced to swim after his craft disintegrated and sank a second time. Despite the hardships of the journey, Clarkson summed up the experience with his final words: "It's hard to sum it up really. Perhaps that's why people when they get back from this place always say the same thing, Vietnam: You don't know, man! You weren't there!" in reference to a scene in Born on the Fourth of July (1989) where Willem Dafoe shouts at Tom Cruise's character during an argument about personal events that took place in the Vietnam War.

In homage to film-maker Francis Ford Coppola and his Vietnam War epic Apocalypse Now, the end credits replaced each crew members first name with the words "Francis Ford" (e.g. "Francis Ford Clarkson", "Francis Ford Hammond", etc.).

=== Filming ===
To assist with production of the special, the BBC partnered itself with Hanuman Films, a production company involved in film and television shoots within south-east Asia, and who had worked before with the broadcaster. The film crew involved with the shoot numbered around 35, 15 of whom were supplied by the production company and the rest by Local Fixers Asia (LFA), with the work coordinated by Nick Ray, a company adviser for Hanuman Films. Filming required not only the procurement of the needed permits to shoot at the various locations featured, but also travel arrangements and accommodation for the film and support crew, and the scouting of locations; LFA took responsibility for scouting out Hạ Long Bay to ensure that filming, which involved the use of six speedboats and a helicopter, did not spoil the world heritage site.

The bikes were supplied and maintained by mechanics from Explore Indochina, who provided further assistance with them during filming, and were responsible for converting the bikes into water craft, with testing done in shallower waters before they were used in the Bay. Following filming, the presenter's bikes were recovered from the bay; only two were taken back to the UK along with the back-up bike – Richard Hammond's Minsk could not be imported back as it failed to meet EURO3 standards. The three bikes were later auctioned, with both Jeremy Clarkson's Vespa and the back-up Honda Chaly later being exhibited as part of the "World of Top Gear" at National Motor Museum, Beaulieu.

== DVD release ==
The DVD, released in March 2009 as part of the Top Gear: The Great Adventures 2 set, featured commentary from producer Andy Wilman and other members of the crew, and ten minutes of deleted footage available as bonus scenes. The deleted footage includes: visits by Clarkson to other car dealerships, and Hammond visiting a John Deere tractor dealership; a test of the bikes by The Stig's Communist cousin (a local stunt biker in red helmet and red racing suit); a race between James May with the Super Cub and a two-cow ploughing team; a discussion of Vietnam's traffic fines between Clarkson and May as Hammond returns after fixing his bike; Clarkson burning his mouth from a chilli pepper.
