= Top Gear series 13 =

Top Gear
- Series 13
- Promotional poster
- Starring: Jeremy Clarkson; Richard Hammond; James May; The Stig
- No. of episodes: 7

Release
- Original network: BBC Two
- Original release: 21 June – 2 August 2009

Series chronology
- ← Previous; Series 12 Next → Series 14

Series 13 of Top Gear, a British motoring magazine and factual television programme, was broadcast in the United Kingdom on BBC Two during 2009, consisting of seven episodes that were aired between 21 June and 2 August. As a publicity stunt, the series also had Michael Schumacher disguise himself as "The Stig", primarily due to the fact that a car they reviewed could not be driven by anyone but Schumacher for a timed lap of the programme's test track. Alongside this, this series' highlights included a 1940s styled race, a motoring challenge involving rear-wheeled cars, and the presenters entering a classic car rally. The thirteenth series received criticism over two elements - one for an advert designed by Jeremy Clarkson as part of a film for an episode; the other for the use of a word deemed offensive.

== Episodes ==
No. overall	No. in series	Reviews	Features/challenges	Guest(s)	Original release date	UK viewers (millions)
106	1	Lotus Evora	Race to the North: (LNER Peppercorn Class A1 60163 Tornado steam train • Jaguar XK120 • Vincent Black Shadow) • Ferrari FXX Lap Time	Michael Schumacher (disguised as The Stig)	21 June 2009	7.86
The trio determine what a Top Gear race from London to Edinburgh would be like in 1949. While May competes in a Jaguar XK120, Hammond races him on a Vincent Black Shadow, and Clarkson enters as part of a train crew aboard a LNER Peppercorn A1 locomotive, the Tornado. Starting from King's Cross, Hammond and May find themselves sticking to the A1 Road and avoiding the motorways, while Clarkson endures the noise and heat in the train cab, as all three vying to reach the finish line at a bar in the Balmoral Hotel. Elsewhere, Clarkson is testing out the Lotus Evora around the track, while the Stig takes the Ferrari FXX for a power lap before coming into the studio and finally revealing who he is.
107	2	Lamborghini Murciélago LP 670-4 SV	Perfect £2,500 car for 17-year-olds: (Volvo 940 Turbo Estate • Volkswagen Golf Mk III • Hyundai Scoupe) • Drag Race: (Mercedes-Benz SLR McLaren 722 Edition vs. Lamborghini Murciélago LP 670-4 SV) • Drag Race II: (Bugatti Veyron vs. McLaren F1)	Stephen Fry	28 June 2009	7.00
The presenters find themselves going out and buying a car that would be perfect for 17-year-olds, on a budget of £2,500 to cover their purchase plus insurance—Clarkson buys a Volvo 940 Turbo Estate, Hammond for a Hyundai Scoupe, while May purchases a Volkswagen Golf Mk III. In a series of challenges, the group engage in teenage activities the car would endure, including leaving a festival car park, repairing damage after a roll, and completing an obstacle course in time while hitting everything. Elsewhere, Stephen Fry is the latest star in the reasonably priced car, while Hammond is in Abu Dhabi to see if the new Lamborghini Murciélago LP670-4 SV is a hypercar in a race against a Mercedes-Benz SLR McLaren 722 Edition, before taking on the Stig in a drag race between the McLaren F1 and the Bugatti Veyron.
108	3	Mercedes-Benz SL65 AMG Black Series	Cheap and Cheerful car I: (Perodua Myvi • Chevrolet Aveo • Proton Satria Neo) • Cheap and Cheerful car II: (Škoda Roomster • Toyota iQ • Alfa Romeo MiTo • Fiat 500) • Gymkhana rallying on the airfield (Subaru Impreza WRX STI)	Michael McIntyre • Ken Block • Ricky Carmichael	5 July 2009	6.38
To beat the recession, the trio take to the streets of London in three small cars that they hate and that bankers will be forced to use—the Proton Satria Neo, the Chevrolet Aveo, and the Perodua Myvi—before heading to the track with three small cars they like—the Škoda Roomster for Clarkson, the Alfa Romeo MiTo for Hammond, and the Toyota iQ for May—and testing them on a challenge devised by each presenter. Meanwhile, Clarkson tests out the new face-lifted Mercedes-Benz SL65 AMG Black Series, May meets professional American stunt driver Ken Block and gets taken for a ride around Ken's own gymkhana and his tuned Subaru Impreza and a race with motocross legend Ricky Carmichael, and comedian Michael McIntyre steps into the reasonably priced car.
109	4	Ford Focus RS • Renault Mégane R26.R • Porsche Panamera	Race: Porsche Panamera vs. the Royal Mail service • Playing British Bulldog with live fire against the British Army in a Mitsubishi Lancer Evolution VII	Usain Bolt	12 July 2009	6.80
Clarkson sees if he can save an old school playground game with cars, by going to a British Army testing area in Dorset and taking on an array of new military hardware, including a Jackal, Mastiff PPV and a Trojan combat engineering vehicle, in a point-to-point race with a 2001 Mitsubishi Lancer Evolution VII RS, while Hammond and May see if the new Porsche Panamera can get from Porthloo in the Isles of Scilly to Birsay on the Orkney Isles faster than a letter being ferried and delivered by the Royal Mail. Meanwhile Clarkson and Hammond compare the latest Ford Focus RS against the Renault Mégane R26.R around the track, and Usain Bolt attempts to prove that he can be fast in the Lacetti as he is with his feet.
110	5	Jaguar XFR • BMW M5	Proof of three £1,500 rear-wheel drive coupés better than front-wheel drive: (Porsche 944 S2 • Ford Capri 2.8i • Nissan 300ZX • Morris Marina) • Clarkson's inspired greenhouse trailer design to save the world	Sienna Miller • Olivier Panis	19 July 2009	7.38
Clarkson, Hammond and May prove that front-wheel drive are no good by buying three second-hand rear-wheel drive cars on a budget of £1,500—Clarkson uses a Porsche 944 S2, Hammond drives a Nissan 300ZX, while May buys the Ford Capri 2.8L. Driving across France, the trio engage in a series of challenges to prove RWD is good, but when it comes to an ice race at Val Thorens, one of the trio is left having to make use of the back-up car—a Morris Marina. Elsewhere, the new Jaguar XFR is given a thorough test by Clarkson against its main rival, the BMW M5. Clarkson does his bit for the environment at finding ways to reduce carbon dioxide emission (with varying results), and Sienna Miller hopes to be an expert at getting a fast time with the Lacetti.
111	6	BMW Z4 sDrive35i • Nissan 370Z	Pre-1982 £3,000 classic cars for a TSD rally in Mallorca: (Austin-Healey Sprite • Citroën Ami • Lanchester LJ 200)	Brian Johnson • Madison Welch • Brian Wheeler	26 July 2009	7.69
The team engage in a classic car rally in Mallorca, with three pre-1982 cars purchased at an auction—Hammond in a Lanchester LJ 200, Clarkson in a Austin-Healey Sprite, and May in a Citroën Ami. After getting the cars prepped, they arrive late to win the Mallorca Classic Car Rally, and so compete against each other in the remaining events, aided by some unique assistant drivers chosen for them. Meanwhile, Clarkson reviews some ferocious dinosaurs on the track, in the form of the new BMW Z4 and the replacement of the Nissan 350Z, the 2009 Nissan 370Z, while AC/DC front man, Brian Johnson, sets out to make a quick lap with the Lacetti. Note: A number of animatronics borrowed from the Walking With Dinosaurs live theatrical show were borrowed by production staff for this episode.
112	7	Vauxhall VXR8 Bathurst • HSV Maloo • Audi S4 • Aston Martin V12 Vantage	Producing Volkswagen Scirocco adverts	Jay Leno	2 August 2009	7.11
Clarkson and May take on the challenge of creating a simple but effective TV advertisement for the new 2009 VW Scirocco TDi, but, as is true with Top Gear, their ambitious ideas of what it should be are truly rubbish and unimpressive for the advertising execs. Elsewhere, Hammond takes a look at a modified version of the VXR8, the Vauxhall VXR8 Bathurst Edition, and the Maloo E Series, while Clarkson drives a car he feels will be consigned to the history books—the Aston Martin V12 Vantage. Meanwhile, the Lacetti gets driven around the track by American talk show host, Jay Leno, who recounts an interesting story of how he avoided being done for speeding while showing off a car. Note: The closing credits were played out to "An Ending (Ascent)" by Brian Eno, rather than the Top Gear theme tune.

== "Schumacher is the Stig" stunt ==
On 20 June 2009, the day before Series 13 was to premiere, Jeremy Clarkson announced in his newspaper column that the Stig would be showing his face on the first episode of the new series. During the episode, the Stig, who had been shown driving a black Ferrari FXX around the test track for a record-setting time of 1:10.7, walked into the studio, before joining Clarkson at the centre stage, whereupon he removed his helmet and revealed himself to be F1 driver Michael Schumacher. In the subsequent interview, Schumacher exhibited some of the Stig's supposedly defining character traits, such as knowing only two facts about ducks that were both wrong. Before the episode ended, Clarkson showed a video clip of the Stig driving around in the Suzuki Liana, where he was shown to exhibit very poor car control, while striking a camera tripod, and eventually getting lost, leaving the presenter to conclude that Schumacher was not truly the Stig after all.

Following the episode's broadcast, the BBC would not confirm if the Schumacher being revealed as the Stig was merely a stunt for the show, but The Telegraph reported the following day that a spokesperson for the show had confirmed that Schumacher played the role of the Stig for the FXX's Power Lap, citing that Ferrari would not allow anyone, neither Ben Collins (the man in the role of the Stig at the time) or anyone else, to drive the £1million car other than Schumacher, further adding that "the identity of the driver at other times would remain 'a mystery'." The following episode, the lap time for the FXX, which was owned by Schumacher himself, was taken off the board after because it both failed to meet road legal standards and used slick tyres.

== Criticism and controversy ==
=== Volkswagen Scirocco TDI advert film ===
During the final episode of the series, Jeremy Clarkson and James May were assigned to produce an advert for the new Volkswagen Scirocco, albeit a spoof of one. The segment received extensive complaints in regards to some of the content in it. One series of complaints was against a remake of a VW advertisement, which seemed to show the actor in it committing suicide on-screen, with Ofcom investigating and later ruling that there had been no editorial justification for its inclusion. The other series of complaints was directed against Clarkson's spoof ad, which showed crowds of Polish people leaving Warsaw in terror on buses and trains, because of the imminent German invasion of Poland, ending with the line "Volkswagen Scirocco TDI: Berlin to Warsaw in one tank".

=== "Pikey" comment ===
In an article for The Guardian, Jodie Matthews accused the show, particularly Jeremy Clarkson and Richard Hammond, of using the word "pikey" during the final episode when discussing about the saloons that Hammond had been reviewing, or alluding to it as Clarkson did by claiming that one of the saloons would be a "perfect car for anyone whose business is selling pegs and heather". She further stated in her article that it would popularise the racist term for Gypsies and Travellers, reinforce traveller stereotypes and legitimise past racist attitudes that had been deemed no longer appropriate, further commenting that she hoped rumours that the motoring show wouldn't be returning (at the time her article was published), turned out to be true.
