= Top Gear series 11 =

Top Gear
- Series 11
- Promotional poster
- Starring: Jeremy Clarkson; Richard Hammond; James May; The Stig
- No. of episodes: 6

Release
- Original network: BBC Two
- Original release: 22 June – 27 July 2008

Series chronology
- ← Previous; Series 10 Next → Series 12

Series 11 of Top Gear, a British motoring magazine and factual television programme, was broadcast in the United Kingdom on BBC Two during 2008, consisting of six episodes that were aired between 22 June and 27 July. This series saw the "Star in a Reasonably Priced Car" featuring two celebrities in each episode (with the exception of the final episode). This series' highlights included a race between a car and Japanese public transport, creating home-made police cars, and a showdown between Top Gear and its German counterpart.

== Episodes ==
No. overall	No. in series	Reviews	Features/challenges	Guest(s)	Original release date	UK viewers (millions)
92	1	Ferrari 430 Scuderia	£1,000 Police Car Challenge (Fiat Coupé 20v Turbo • Lexus LS400 • Suzuki Vitara) • TG Stuntman: Austin Allegro jump in reverse world record • Investigating fuel economy: 5 supercars race and BMW M3 vs Prius	Alan Carr • Justin Lee Collins	22 June 2008	6.72
The presenters each have £1,000 to spend, plus a further £500 for modifications, to buy a used car and convert it into a police cruiser that can be better than the Vauxhall Astra diesel that British police use. Clarkson hopes his turbocharged 20V Fiat Coupé with fitted scythed wheel covers and modern siren system is up to the task, May believes his Lexus LS400 with rear-mounted paint gun system and "siren" (from an ice cream van) can catch "crims", while Hammond has got a lot of 'blues and twos' on his Suzuki Vitara which is complete with an ambitious self-deploying spike strip. To see whose is best, the trio try to drive and fast and flamboyantly, help to clear up an accident site, and then try to apprehend The Stig as he makes a run for it. Elsewhere, Clarkson discuss fuel economy with some supercars and, looks at the Ferrari 430 Scuderia, new member, Top Gear Stunt Man, tries to see how many cars he can drive backwards over in an Austin Allegro Vanden Plas 1500, and Justin Lee Collins and Alan Carr see who was faster in the Lacetti.
93	2	Mitsubishi Lancer Evolution X • Subaru Impreza WRX STI • Audi RS6 • Mercedes-Benz CLK63 AMG Black Series	Race: Audi RS6 vs French Skiers • TG Stuntman: MG Maestro Cork-screw Jump	Rupert Penry-Jones • Peter Firth	29 June 2008	5.21
Hammond travels to the French Alps to take a look at the second-generation Audi RS6 Avant and sees how good it is in a race between the car and two French skiers, while Clarkson tests out the new Mitsubishi Lancer Evolution X and the new Subaru Impreza WRX STI to see which one he likes, and then drives the very fun Mercedes-Benz CLK63 AMG Black Series. Meanwhile, May sees if Top Gear Stunt Man can replicate the extremely difficult, 360-degree corkscrew jump with a MG Maestro, the Cool Wall is back and it's business as usual for Clarkson and Hammond, and the stars of Spooks, Rupert Penry-Jones and Peter Firth, are the latest stars in the reasonably priced Lacetti.
94	3	Bentley Brooklands	Cheap Car Challenge: Alfa Romeos for £1,000 (Alfa Romeo 75 3.0 V6 • Alfa Romeo GTV 2.0 • Alfa Romeo Spider)	James Corden • Rob Brydon	6 July 2008	5.78
To be a true "petrolhead", you need to have owned an Alfa Romeo - that's what the Top Gear presenters believe, so to see if they are right, the show's producers challenge them to buy any Alfa Romeo they want with their own money and put them through a series of challenges - Clarkson buys an Alfa Romeo 75 3.0 V6, Hammond takes an Alfa Romeo Spider 2.0i, and May purchases an Alfa Romeo GTV 2.0 Twin Spark. To see whose Alfa is the best, the trio see how many cars they can overtake on a track day at Rockingham Raceway Circuit, make and attempt to sell calendars featuring their cars, before decorating and restoring their cars and driving them to an Alfa Romeo Concours competition. Meanwhile, Clarkson reviews the hand-made Bentley Brooklands, and Gavin & Stacey stars James Corden and Rob Brydon see who is fastest in the reasonably priced car.
95	4	Alfa Romeo 8C Competizione • Nissan GT-R	Epic race: Nissan GT-R vs Japanese Bullet Train	Fiona Bruce • Kate Silverton	13 July 2008	5.70
The Nissan GT-R has received so much press, that Clarkson believes there's only one way to see how good it is – to race it against Japan's legendary Bullet Train. Naturally, as he attempts to get from Hakui, Ishikawa to a Buddha shrine "dedicated to road safety" on top of Mount Nokogiri in Chiba, his colleagues, Hammond and May, take to Japan's public transport, using trains, buses, a ferry and a cable car alongside the Bullet Train, to see if they can beat him, and there is plenty of trouble for both when they're making their way through Tokyo. Meanwhile, Clarkson tries out the Alfa Romeo 8C Competizione on the track, and British newsreaders, Fiona Bruce and Kate Silverton, drive in very wet conditions with the Lacetti.
96	5	Nissan GT-R	Classic luxury limousines: (Mercedes-Benz 600 Grosser • Rolls-Royce Corniche) • Daihatsu Terios fox hunting challenge	Peter Jones • Theo Paphitis	20 July 2008	6.65
Clarkson remains in Japan to further test out the abilities of the Nissan GT-R on the Fuji Speedway, before seeing if his large, 1969 Mercedes-Benz 600, is any better than May's 1972 Rolls-Royce Corniche Coupé, as the pair take them through a series of challenges, including a quarter-mile "push" race and a test to successfully and legally park their cars in the middle of London. Elsewhere, there's chance for Top Gear to save the countryside with Clarkson driving a 4WD Daihatsu Terios and being pursued by Hammond in a game of "Small Japanese Off-Roader Hunting", and Peter Jones and Theo Paphitis are hoping they invested well with the Lacetti for a fast time.
97	6	Gumpert Apollo • Mitsuoka Orochi • Mitsuoka Galue III	Showdown: The British (Top Gear) vs. The Germans (D Motor)	Jay Kay • Sabine Schmitz • Tim Schrick • Carsten van Ryssen	27 July 2008	5.59
The Top Gear presenters are representing Britain against their German counterparts from motoring show D Motor - Sabine Schmitz, Carsten van Ryssen and Tim Schrick. To see who is the best, the two teams compete against each other in a series of challenges on the Zolder circuit in Belgium, including a "double-decker" race and a two-lap race between Britain's Aston Martin DBRS9 and Germany's Porsche 997 GT3 Cup. Meanwhile, Hammond tests out enormous power of the Gumpert Apollo, May reveals what else he did in Japan with his tests of the Mitsuoka Orochi and the Galue, and Jay Kay is in the Lacetti to see if he can beat Simon Cowell for Clarkson's sake.

== Gallery ==
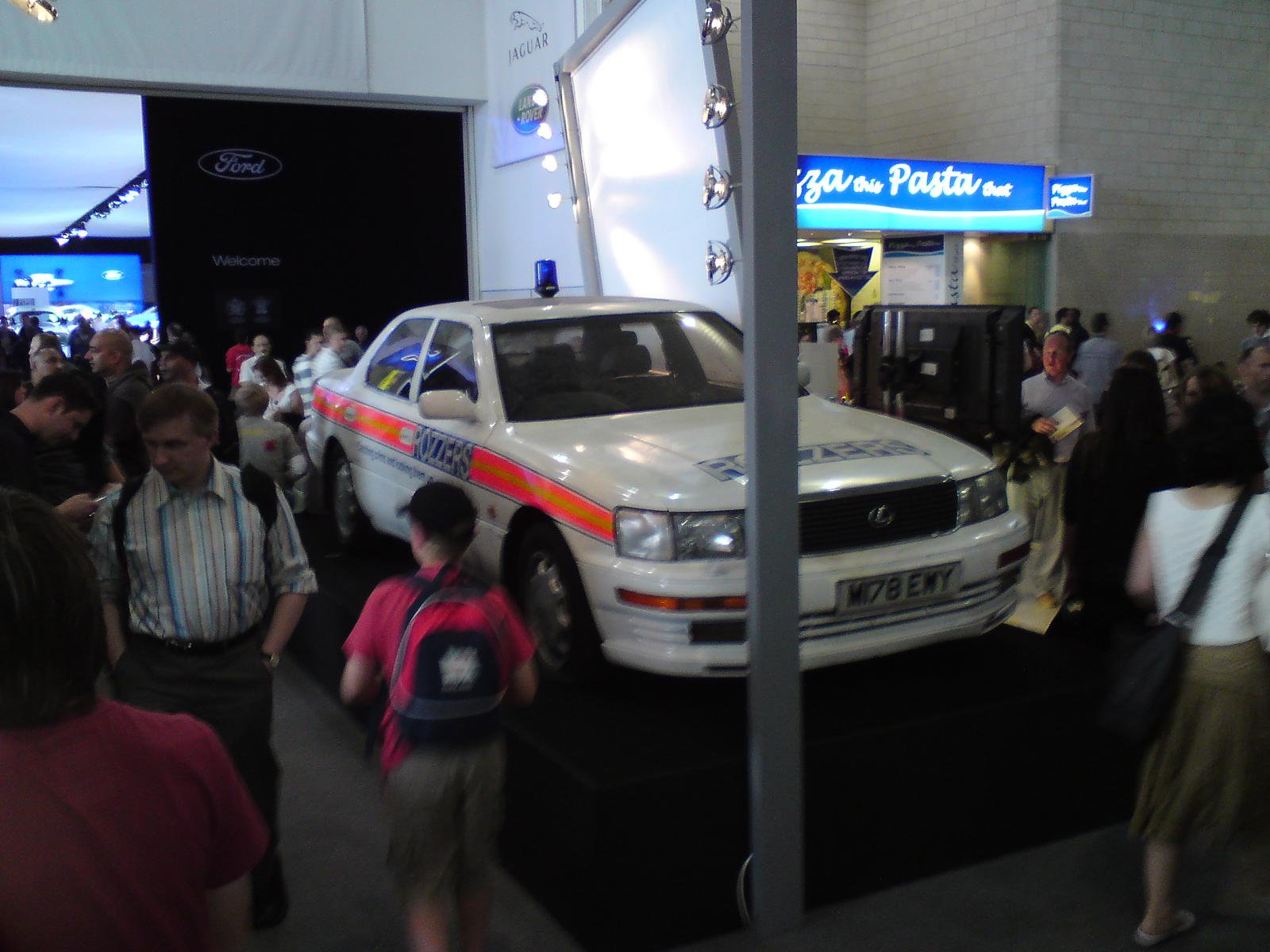
James May's Lexus LS400 as seen from the first episode.

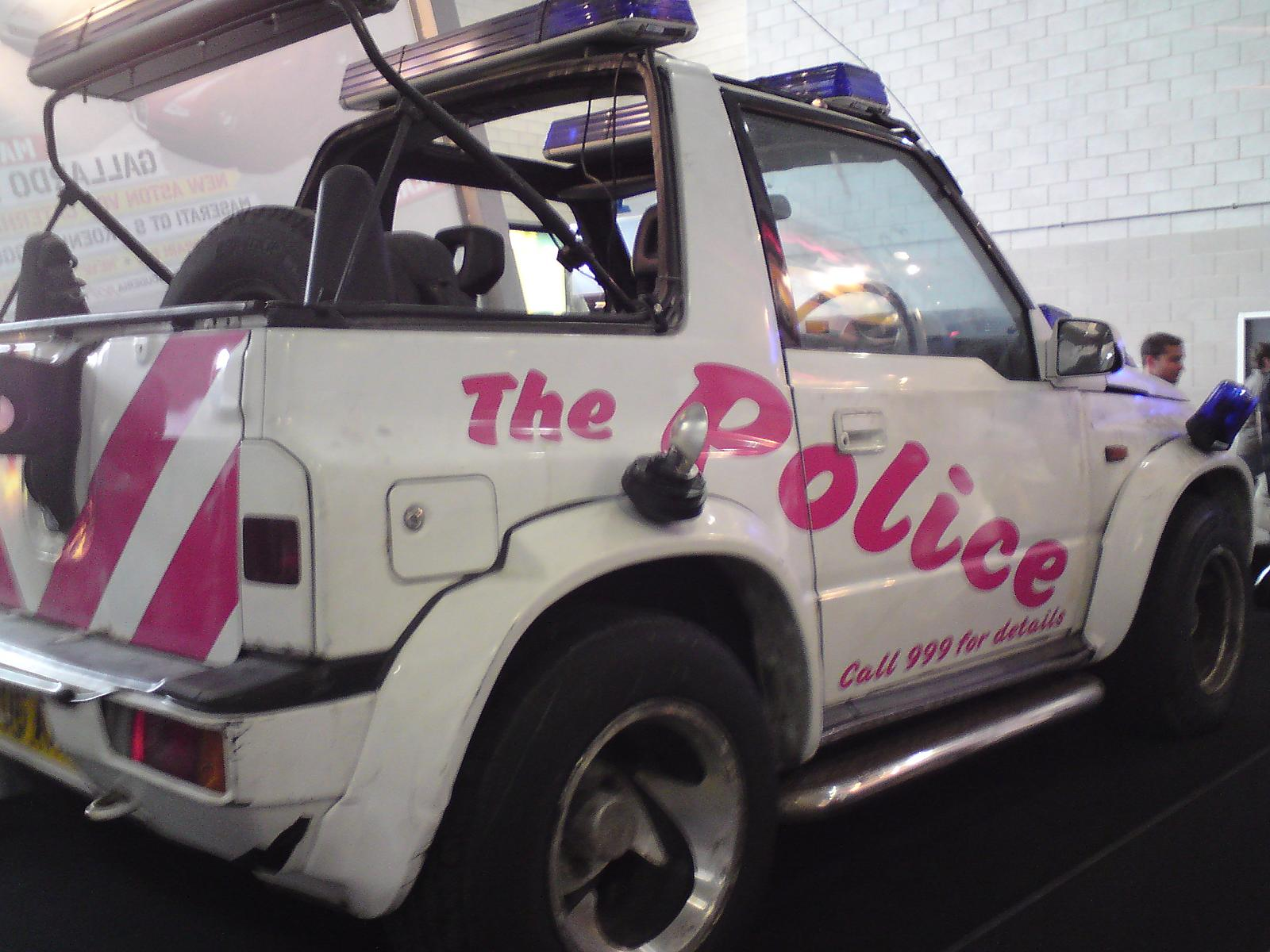
Richard Hammond's Suzuki Vitara as seen from the first episode.

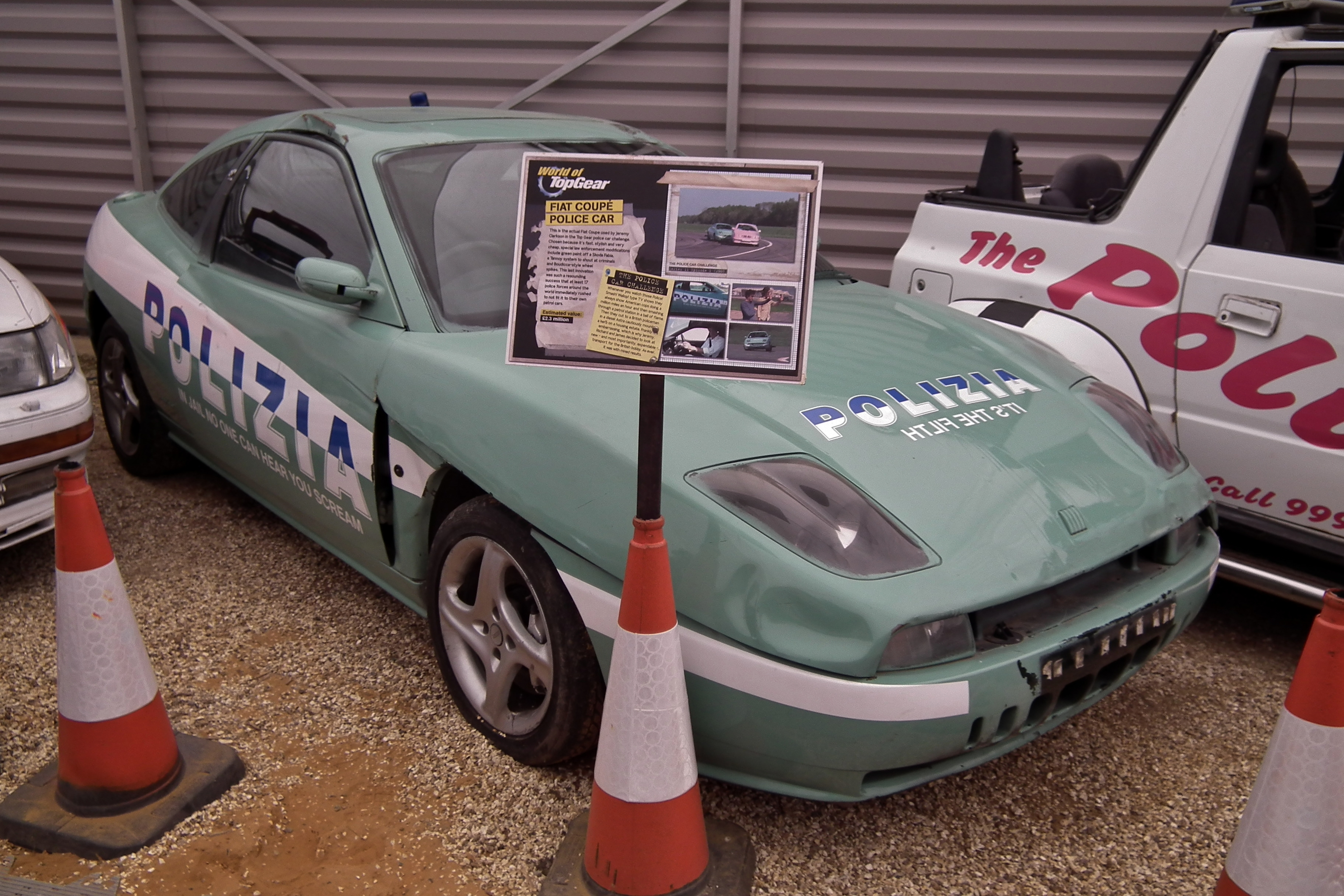
Jeremy Clarkson's Fiat Coupe 20V as seen from the first episode.

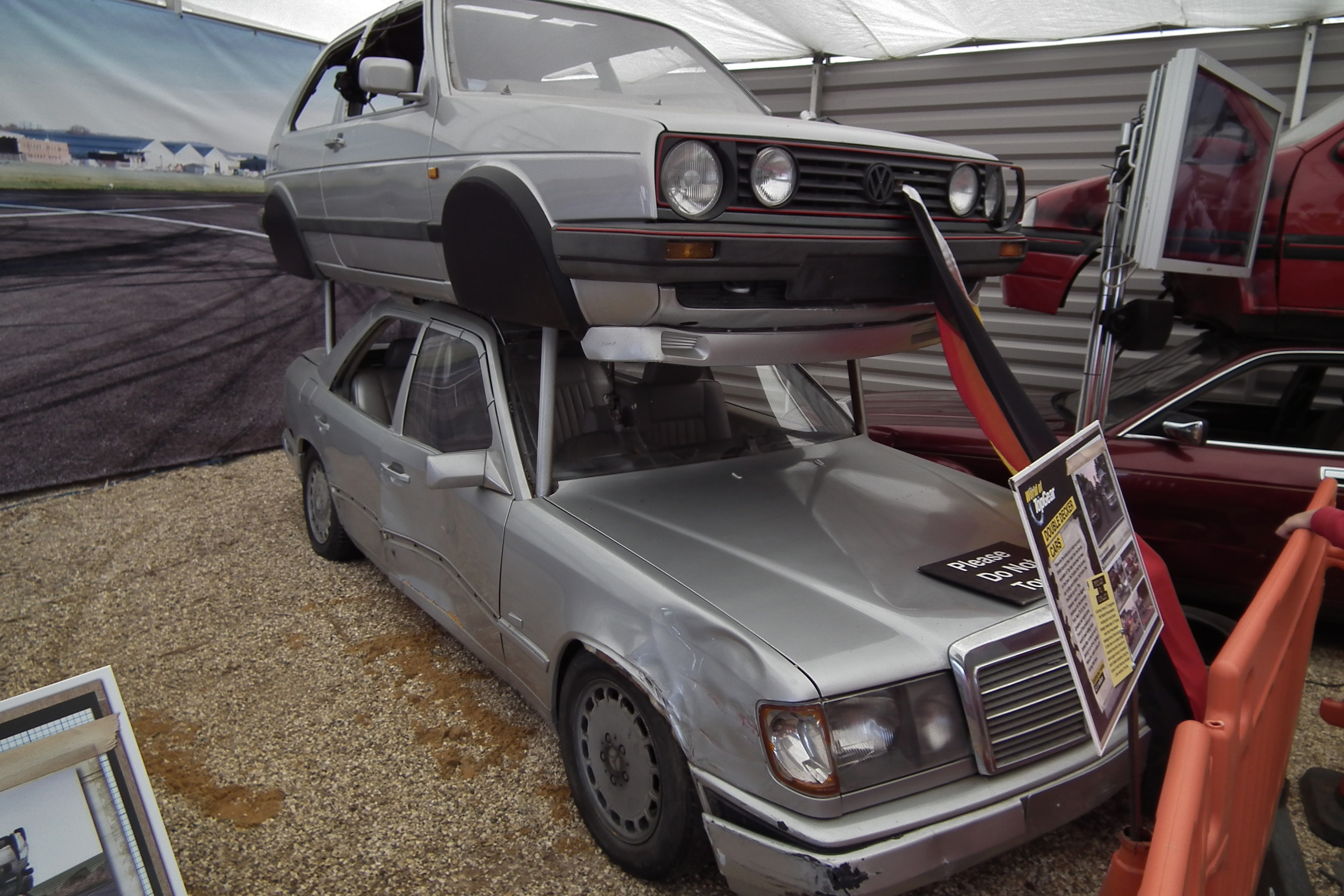
The double-decker cars: Mercedes-Benz W124 (bottom) and Volkswagen Golf Mk2 (top) as shown from the last episode.
