= Toyota i-unit =

Single-seater Toyota concept car

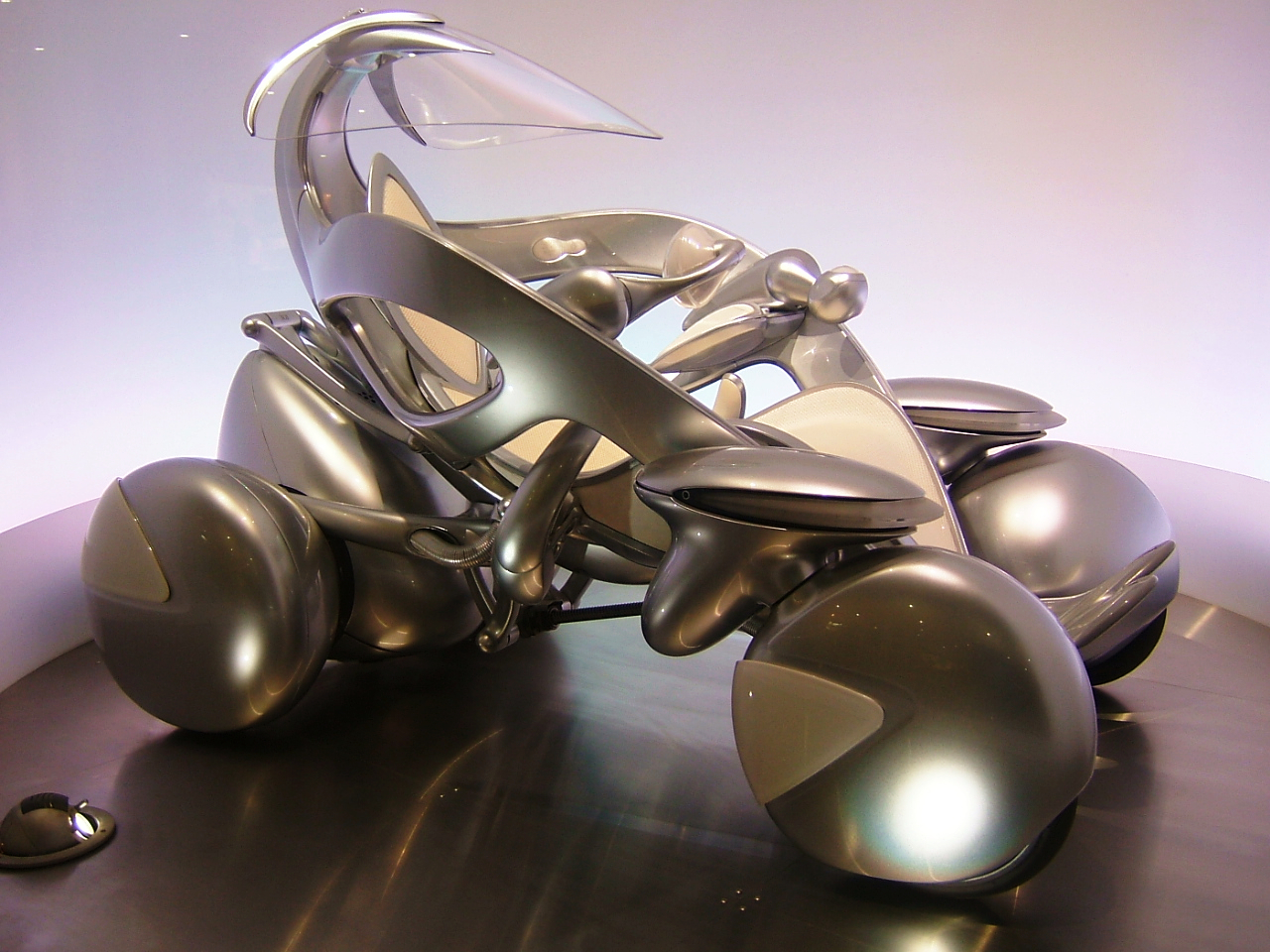
Toyota i-Unit.

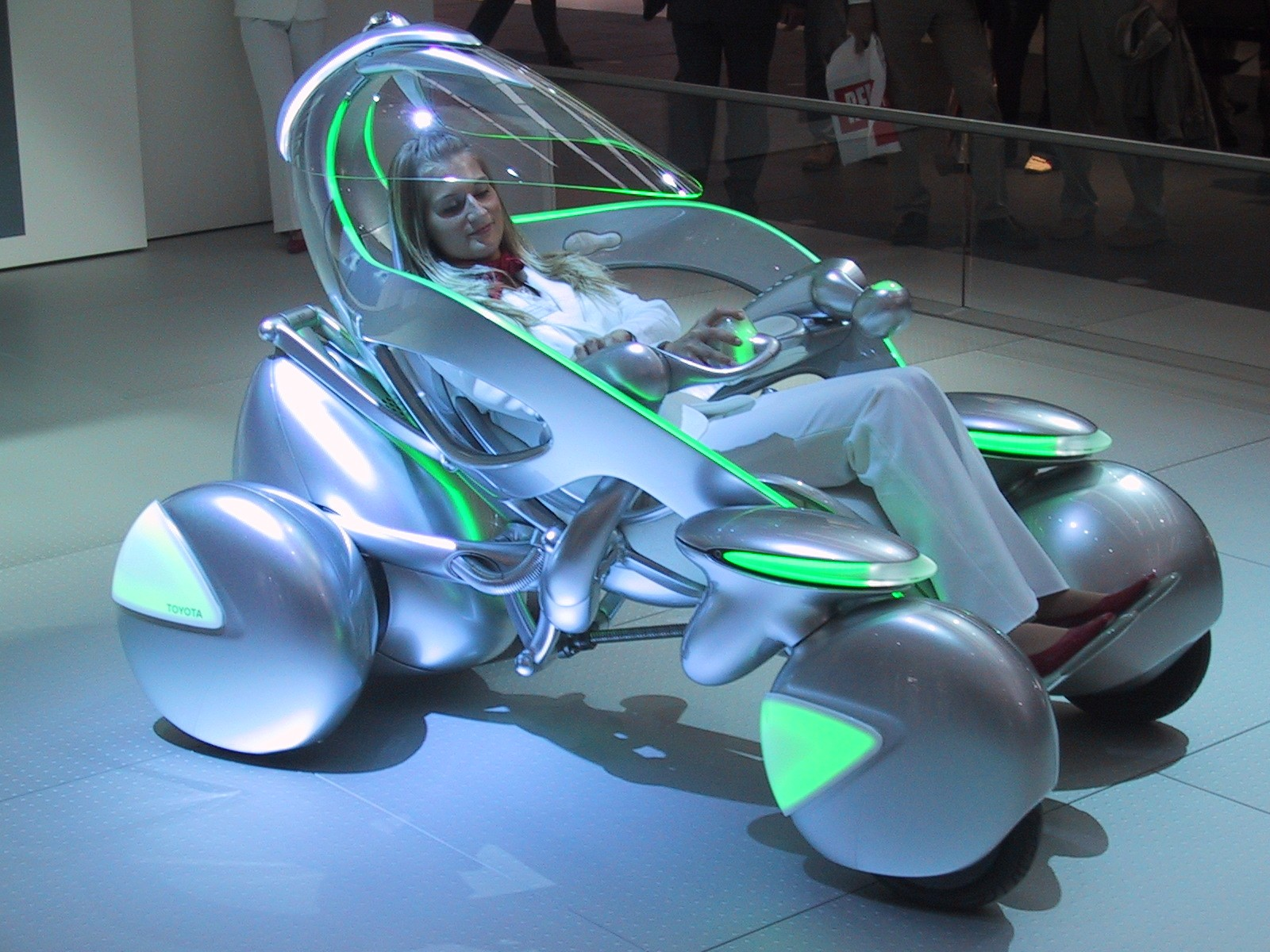
The i-Unit in the low position at the IAA 2005 in Frankfurt.

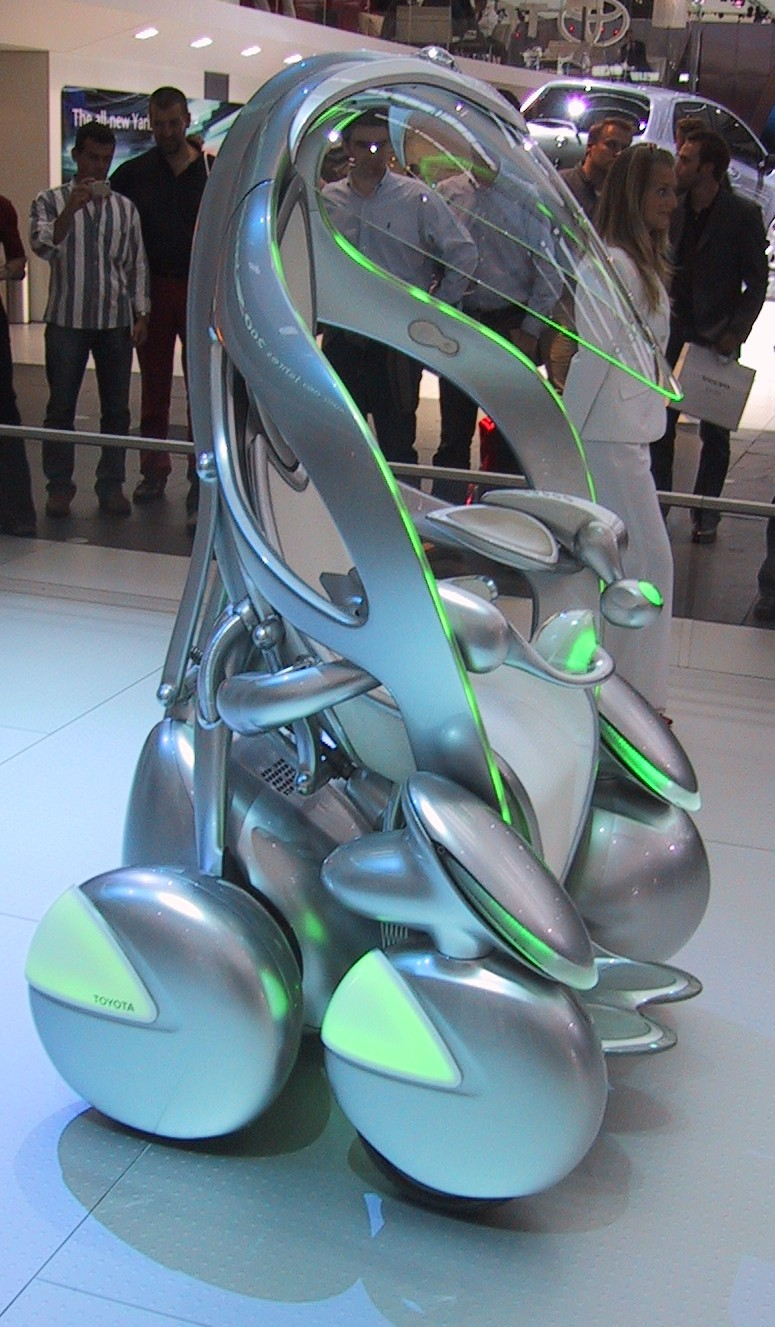
The i-Unit in the high position at the IAA 2005 in Frankfurt.

The i-unit is an ultra-compact single-seater four-wheeled Toyota concept car. It debuted at the World Expo 2005, held in Aichi Prefecture, Japan. The vehicle is a cross between a microcar, a motorcycle, and a vehicular exoskeleton. The goal of Toyota is to provide a personal mobility, which can be used on roads but also does not hinder interaction with pedestrians. For this the i-unit has two possible setups. First, there is an upright low speed setup, where the rider has a higher position and can have conversations face-to-face with pedestrians and can move among people. This upright position can be transformed while driving to a low position, where the rider sits much lower and more reclined. This high speed setup has a much lower center of gravity and is for driving at higher speeds.

The i-unit weighs 180 kilograms (400 lb). It contains a lithium-ion battery and features Intelligent Transport System technology. The rear wheels are powered by electric motors, and the device is steered with the front wheels. In the upright position it has a turning radius of 0.9 metres (35.4 in), which means it can turn on the spot. The vehicle is controlled by two joystick-like devices at the front of the armrests, and uses a Drive-by-wire technology. An Intelligent Transport System (ITS) technology aims to reduce the likelihood of accidents.

The color of the lights can change according to the preferences or emotions of the operator. The shape was designed to symbolize a leaf, and the design incorporates environmentally friendly materials such as kenaf.

This concept vehicle is used by Toyota for public relations, and they state that The "i-unit" is a form of "personal mobility" that seeks to attain a greater balance of meeting individuals' wishes to enjoy freedom of movement, harmony with society, and harmony with the Earth's natural environment. They also refer to these vehicles as wearable personal mobility vehicles. A representative at the IAA 2005 in Frankfurt stated that Toyota may plan to offer these types of vehicles for sale, but did not provide a date when the vehicle will be available. Currently the vehicle lacks features such as a storage compartment (i.e. Trunk or glove compartment), and the protection against bad weather is inadequate.

Twelve i-units together with two Toyota i-foots (two legged walking seats for one passenger, maximum capacity 60 kg) performed at the Toyota Pavilion at the 2005 World Expo in Aichi.

Dimension	Low speed	High speed
Length	1.100 metres (43.3 in)	1.800 metres (70.9 in)
Height	1.800 metres (70.9 in)	1.250 metres (49.2 in)
Width	1.040 metres (40.9 in)	0.540 metres (21.3 in)
Wheelbase	0.540 metres (21.3 in)	1.300 metres (51.2 in)

The i-unit has been superseded by the i-swing, a three-wheeler that leans in curves. One of the i-units produced is on display in the London Science Museum, where its bio-plastic panels are featured.

== See also ==
- Microcar
